= History of painting =

History of painting

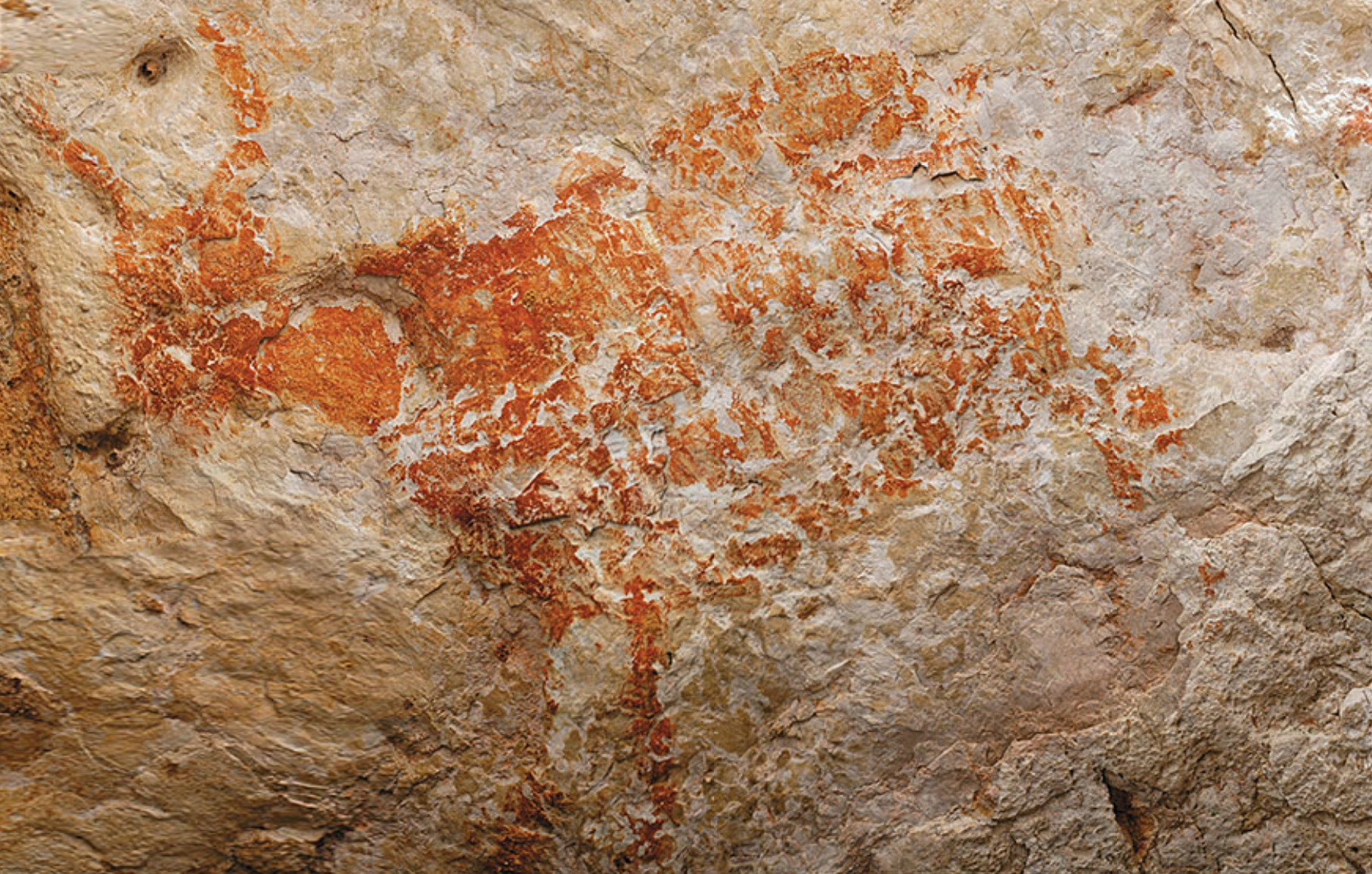
Lubang Jeriji Saléh cave, in Kalimantan, Indonesia, contains one of the oldest known figurative paintings, a 40,000-year-old depiction of a bull.

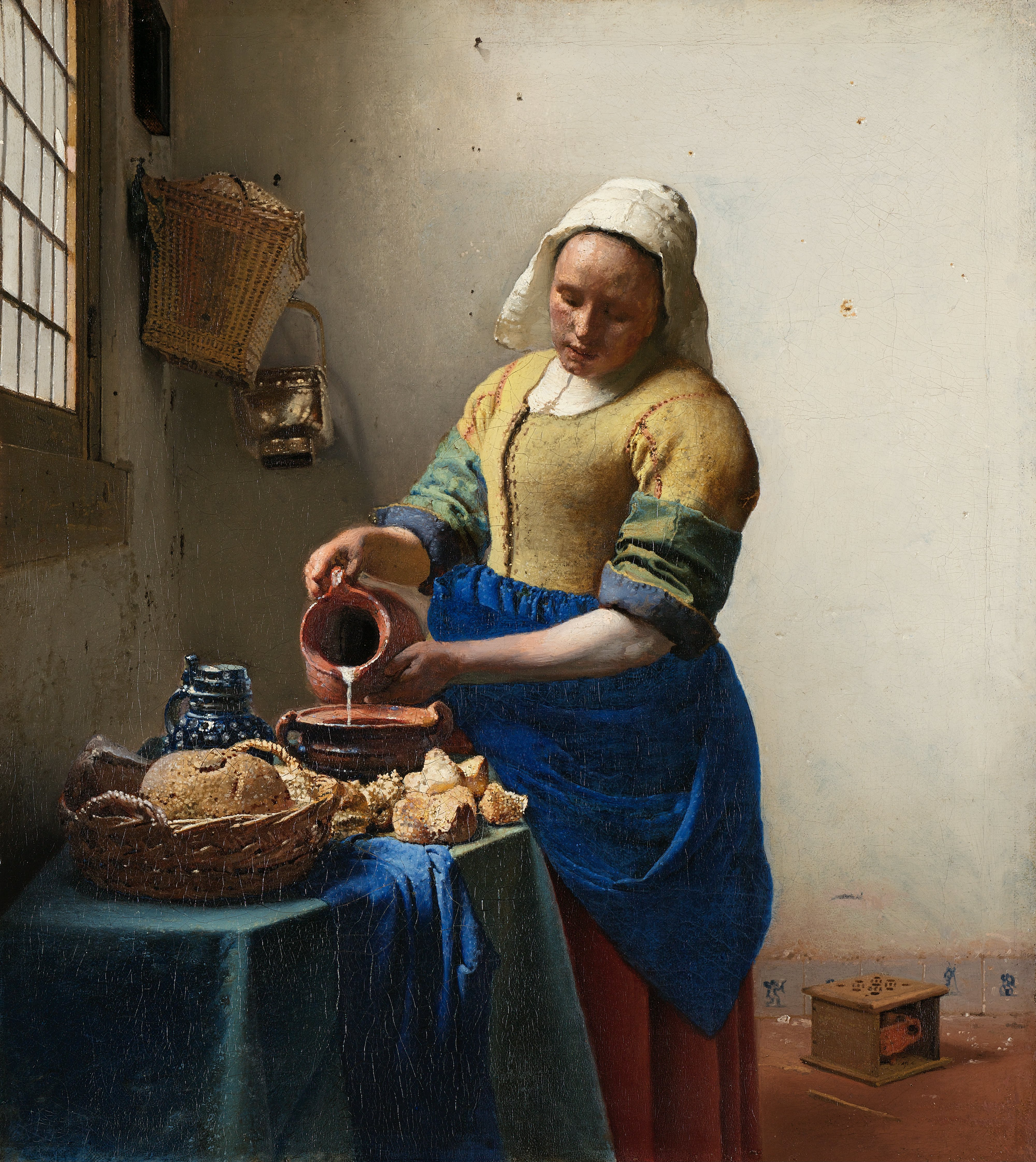
The Milkmaid by Johannes Vermeer, c. 1657

The history of painting reaches back in time to artifacts and artwork created by pre-historic artists, and spans all cultures. It represents a continuous, though periodically disrupted, tradition from Antiquity. Across cultures, continents, and millennia, the history of painting consists of an ongoing river of creativity that continues into the 21st century. Until the early 20th century it relied primarily on representational, religious and classical motifs, after which time more purely abstract and conceptual approaches gained favor.

Developments in Eastern painting historically parallel those in Western painting, in general, a few centuries earlier. African art, Jewish art, Islamic art, Indonesian art, Indian art, Chinese art, and Japanese art each had significant influence on Western art, and vice versa.

Initially serving utilitarian purpose, followed by imperial, private, civic, and religious patronage, Eastern and Western painting later found audiences in the aristocracy and the middle class. From the Modern era, the Middle Ages through the Renaissance painters worked for the church and a wealthy aristocracy. Beginning with the Baroque era artists received private commissions from a more educated and prosperous middle class. Finally in the West the idea of "art for art's sake" began to find expression in the work of the Romantic painters like Francisco de Goya, John Constable, and J. M. W. Turner. The 19th century saw the rise of the commercial art gallery, which provided patronage in the 20th century.

== Pre-history ==
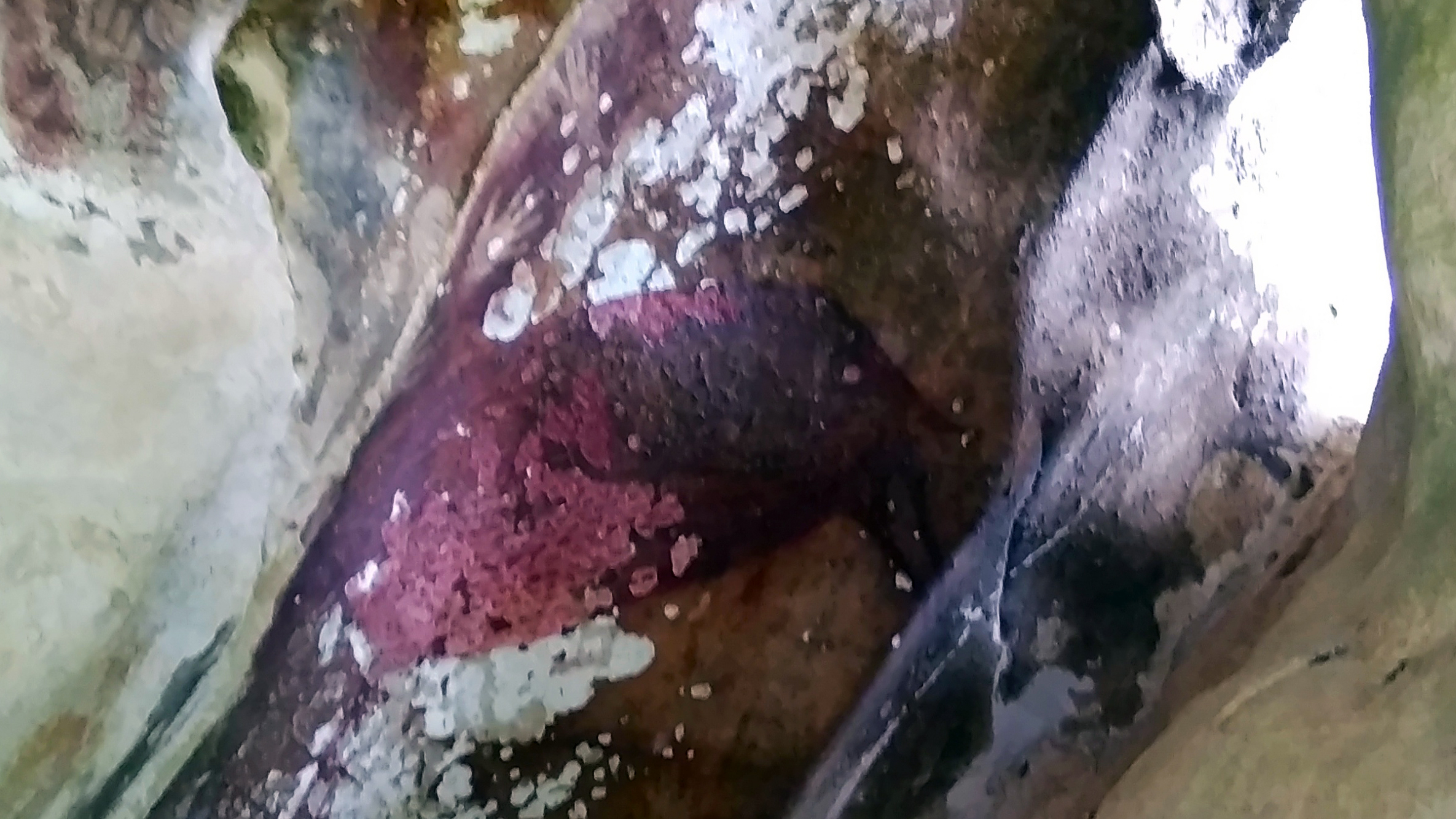
Cave paintings depicting a wild boar hunt in the Maros-Pangkep karst of Sulawesi are estimated to be at least 43,900 years old (2014). This finding was recognized as "the oldest known depiction of storytelling and the earliest instance of figurative art in human history."

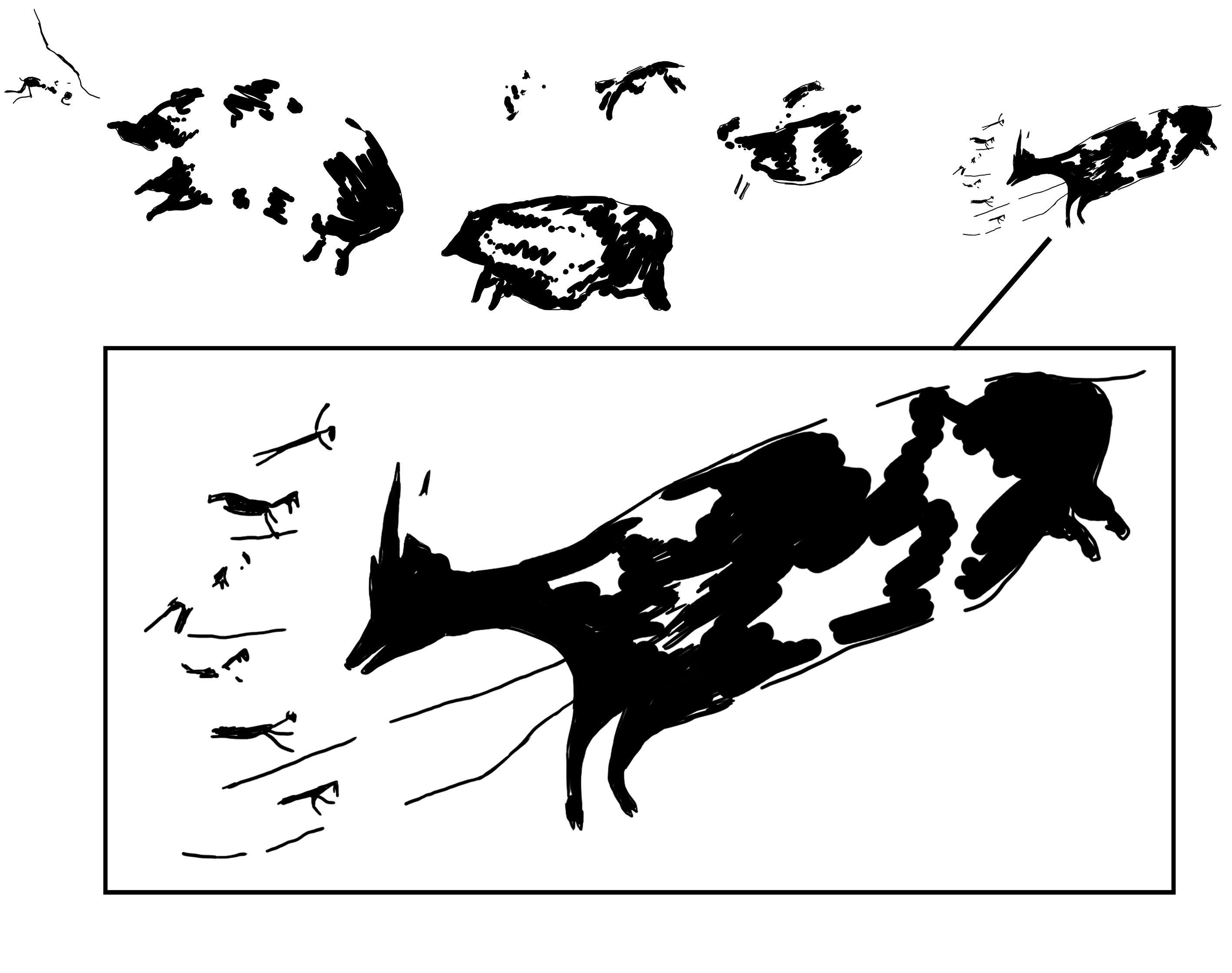
Redrawing of hunting scene from the Caves in the Maros-Pangkep karst

The oldest known paintings are more than 40,000-60,000 years old (art of the Upper Paleolithic) and found in the caves in the district of Maros (Sulawesi, Indonesia). They are constructed from hand stencils and simple geometric shapes.{{efn|Some hand prints have been found in Tibet and dated to about 200,000 years-old.

In November 2018, scientists reported the discovery of the then-oldest known figurative art painting, over 40,000 (perhaps as old as 52,000) years old, of an unknown animal, in the cave of Lubang Jeriji Saléh in the Indonesian island of Borneo. In December 2019, cave paintings portraying pig hunting within the Maros-Pangkep karst region in Sulawesi were discovered to be even older, with an estimated age of at least 43,900 years. This finding was recognized as "the oldest known depiction of storytelling and the earliest instance of figurative art in human history." In 2021, cave art of a pig found in Sulawesi, Indonesia, and dated to over 45,500 years ago, has been reported. On July 3, 2024, the journal Nature published research findings indicating that the cave paintings which depict anthropomorphic figures interacting with a pig and measure 36 by 15 inches (91 by 38 cm) in Leang Karampuang are approximately 51,200 years old, establishing them as the oldest known paintings in the world.

In Paleolithic times, the representation of humans in cave paintings was rare. Mostly, animals were painted, not only animals that were used as food but also animals that represented strength like the rhinoceros or large Felidae, as in the Chauvet Cave. Signs like dots were sometimes drawn. Rare human representations include handprints and stencils, and figures depicting human–animal hybrids. The Chauvet Cave in the Ardèche Departments of France contains the most important preserved cave paintings of the Paleolithic era, painted around 31,000 BC. The Altamira cave paintings in Spain were done 14,000 to 12,000 BC and depict bison, as well as other animals. The hall of bulls in Lascaux, Dordogne, France, is one of the best known cave paintings and dates to about 15,000 to 10,000 BC.

If there is meaning to the paintings, it remains unknown. The caves were not in an inhabited area, so they may have been used for seasonal rituals. The animals are accompanied by signs which suggest a possible magic use. Arrow-like symbols in Lascaux are sometimes interpreted as being used as calendars or almanacs, but the evidence remains inconclusive. An important work of the Mesolithic era were the marching warriors, a rock painting at Cingle de la Mola, Castellón, Spain dated to about 7000 to 4000 BC. The technique used was probably spitting or blowing the pigments onto the rock. The paintings are quite naturalistic, though stylized. The figures are not three-dimensional, even though they overlap.

The earliest known Indian paintings were the rock paintings of prehistoric times, the petroglyphs as found in places like the Rock Shelters of Bhimbetka, and some of them are older than 5500 BC. Such works continued and after several millennia, in the 7th century, carved pillars of Ajanta, Maharashtra state present a fine example of Indian paintings. The colors, mostly various shades of red and orange, were derived from hematite and other mineral pigments.

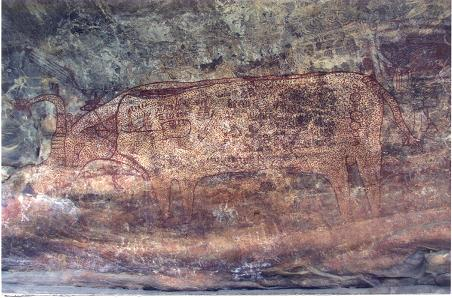
Rock Shelters of Bhimbetka, rock painting, Stone Age, India

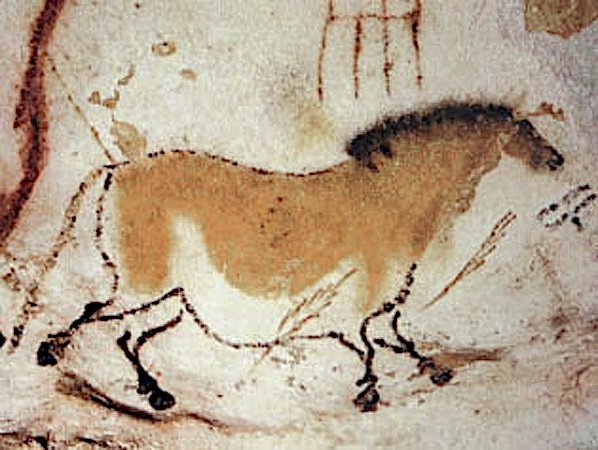
Lascaux, Horse

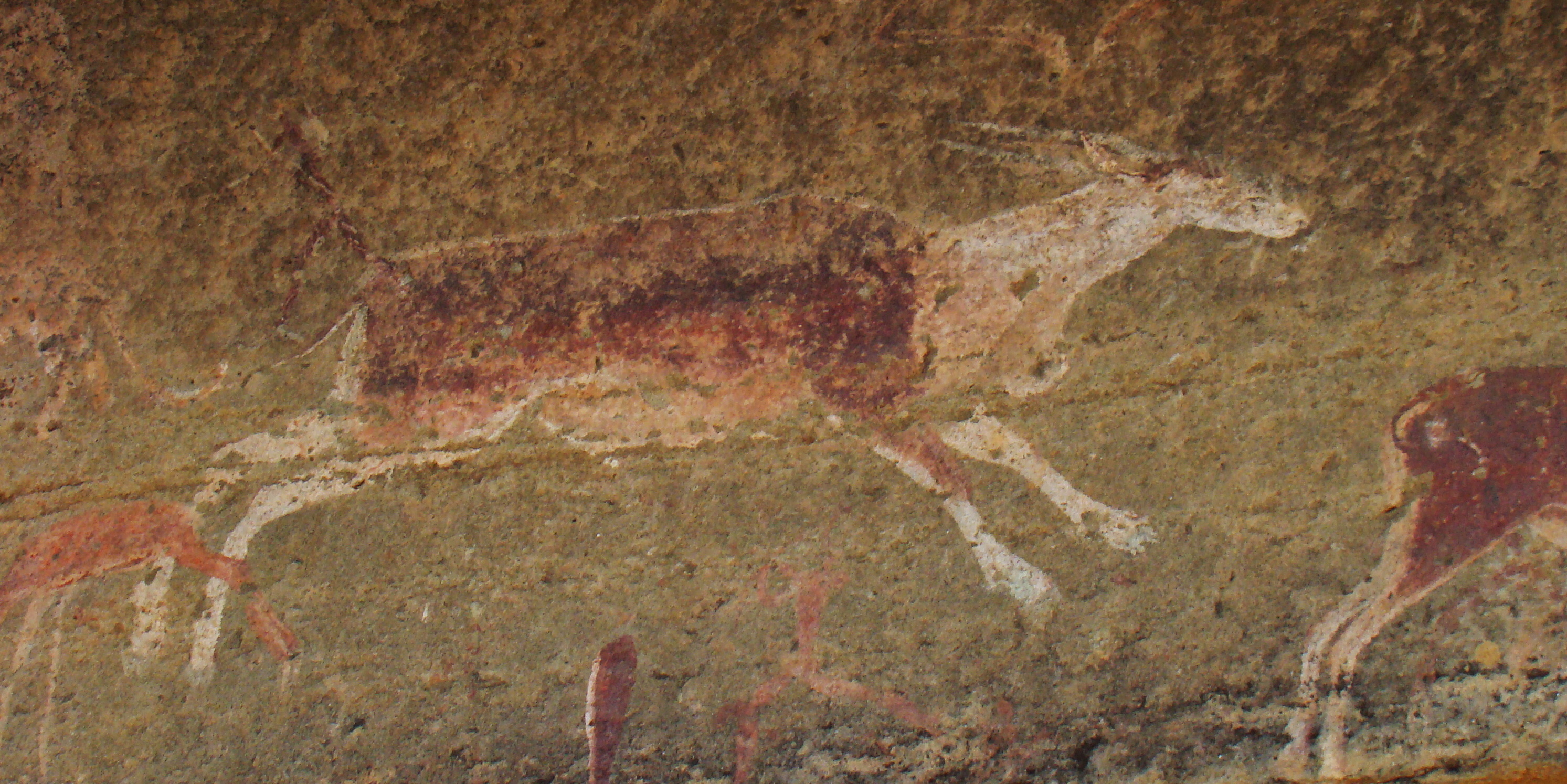
Eland, rock painting, Drakensberg, South Africa

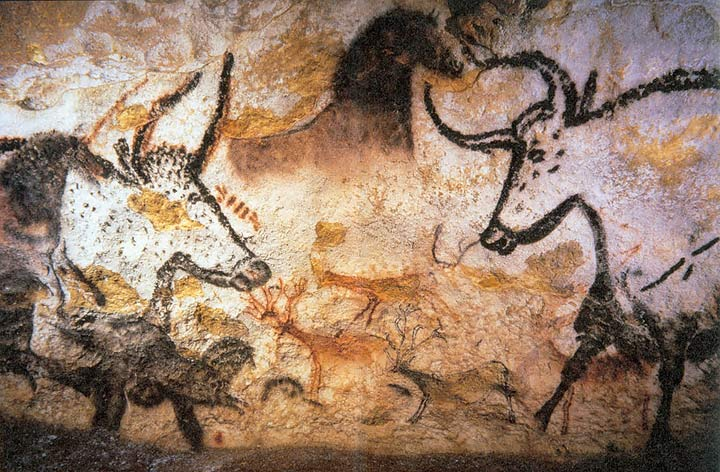
Lascaux, Bulls and Horses

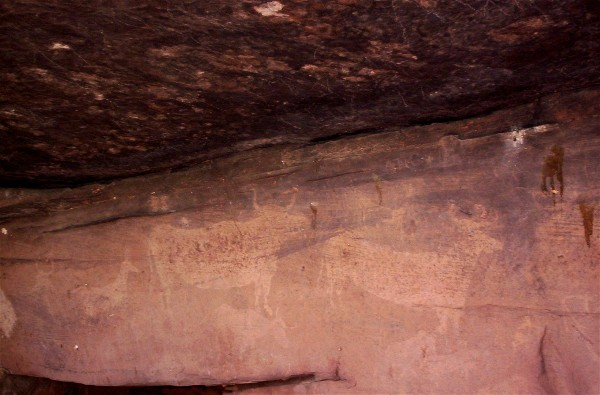
Spanish cave painting of Bulls

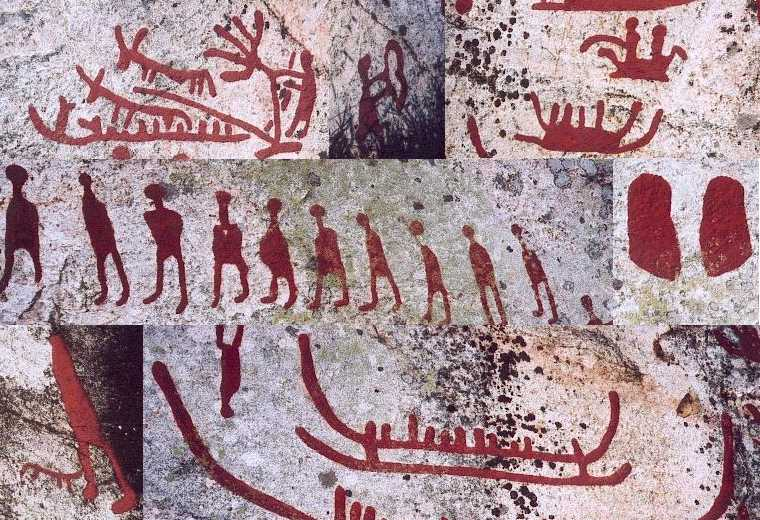
Petroglyphs, from Sweden, Nordic Bronze Age (painted)

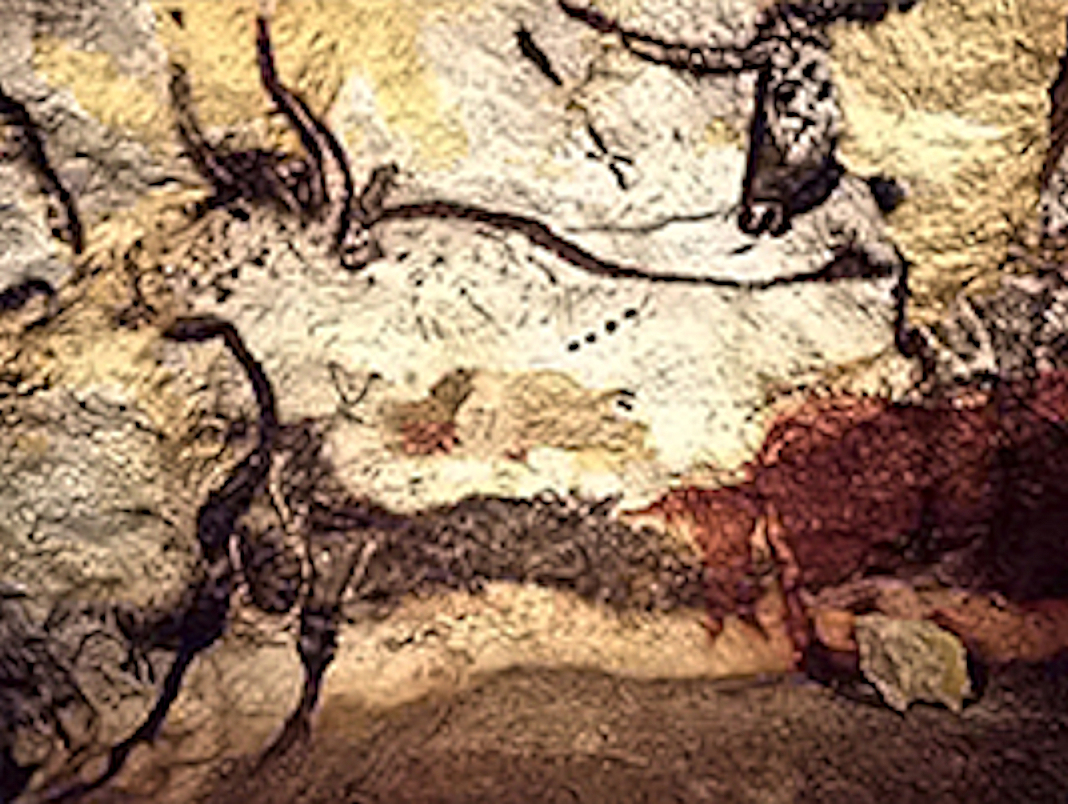
Lascaux, Aurochs (Bos primigenius primigenius)

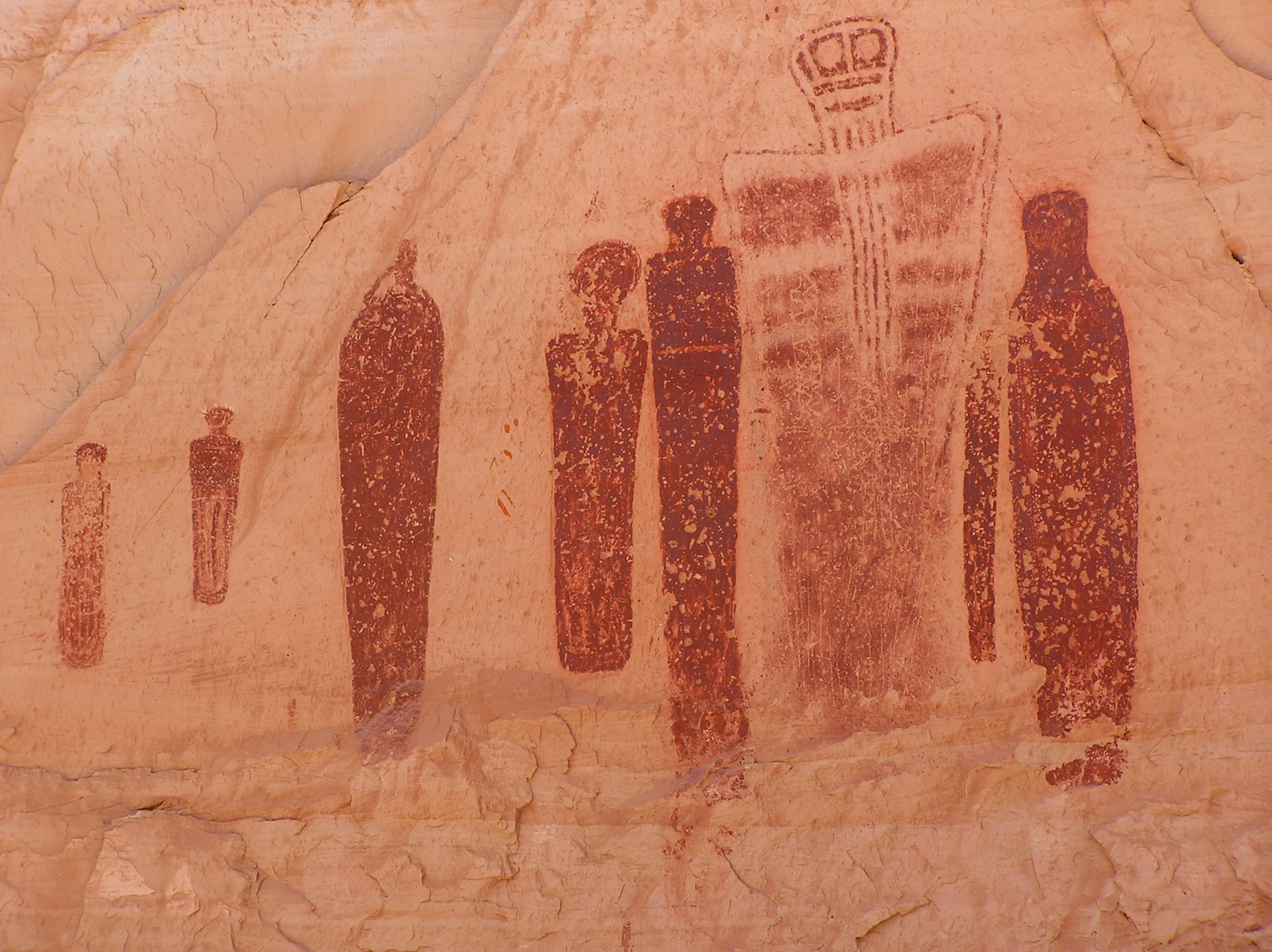
Pictographs from the Great Gallery, Canyonlands National Park, Horseshoe Canyon, Utah, c. 1500 BCE

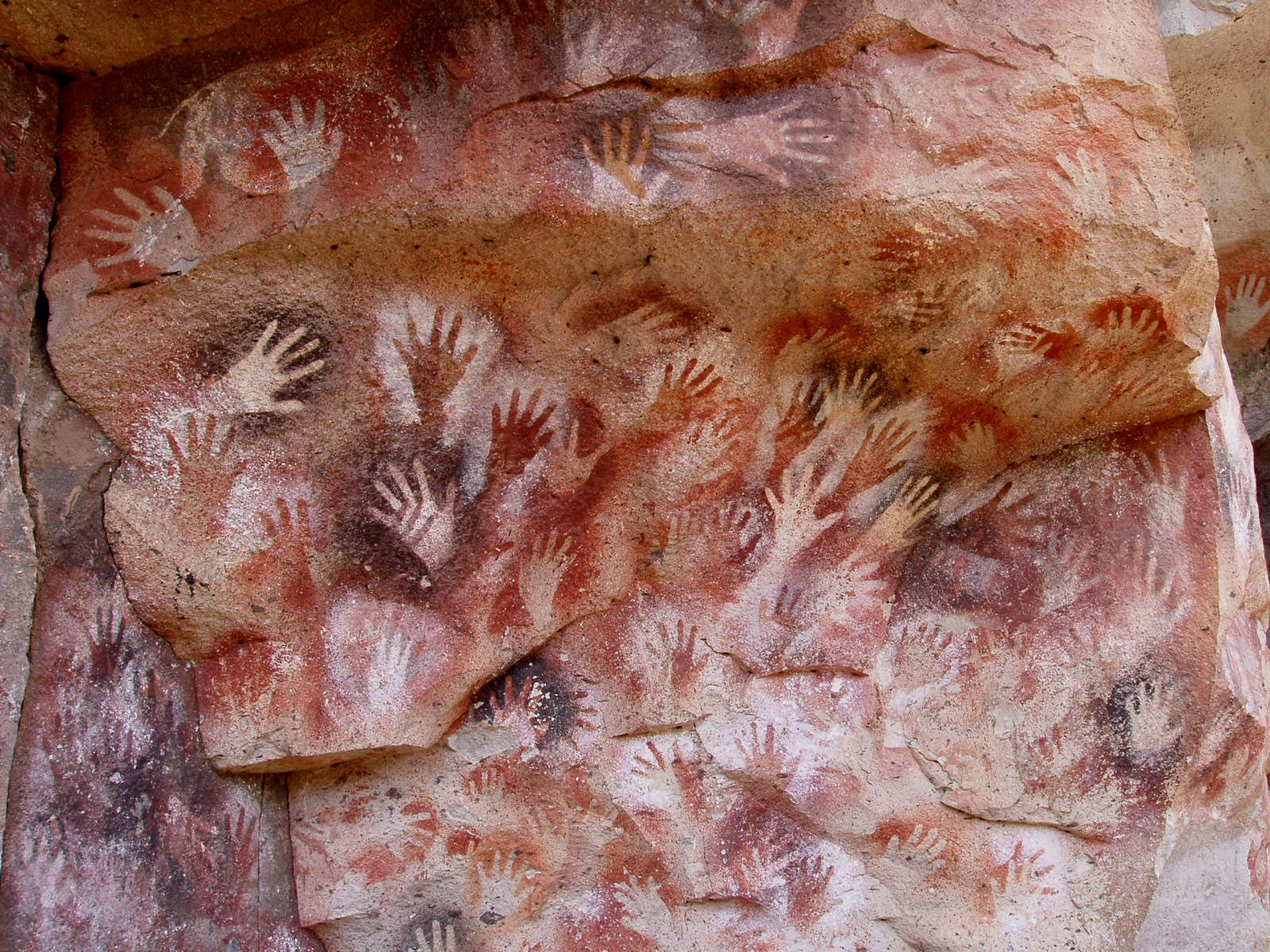
Cueva de las Manos (Spanish for Cave of the Hands) in the Santa Cruz province in Argentina, c. 7300 BC

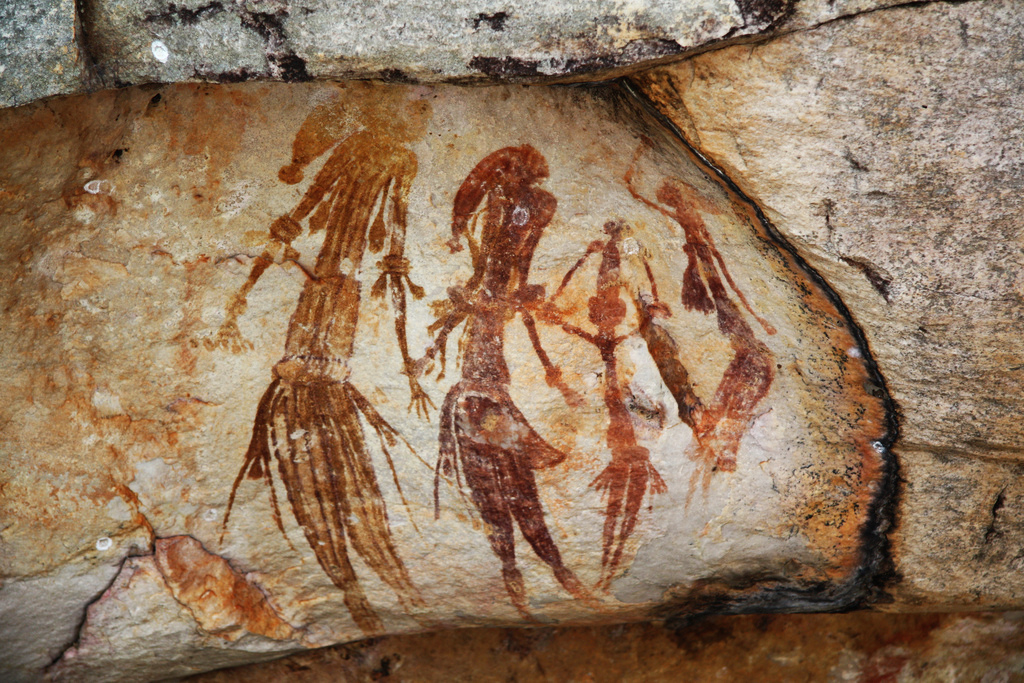
Gwion Gwion rock paintings found in the north-west Kimberley region of Western Australia c. 15,000 BC

== Eastern ==
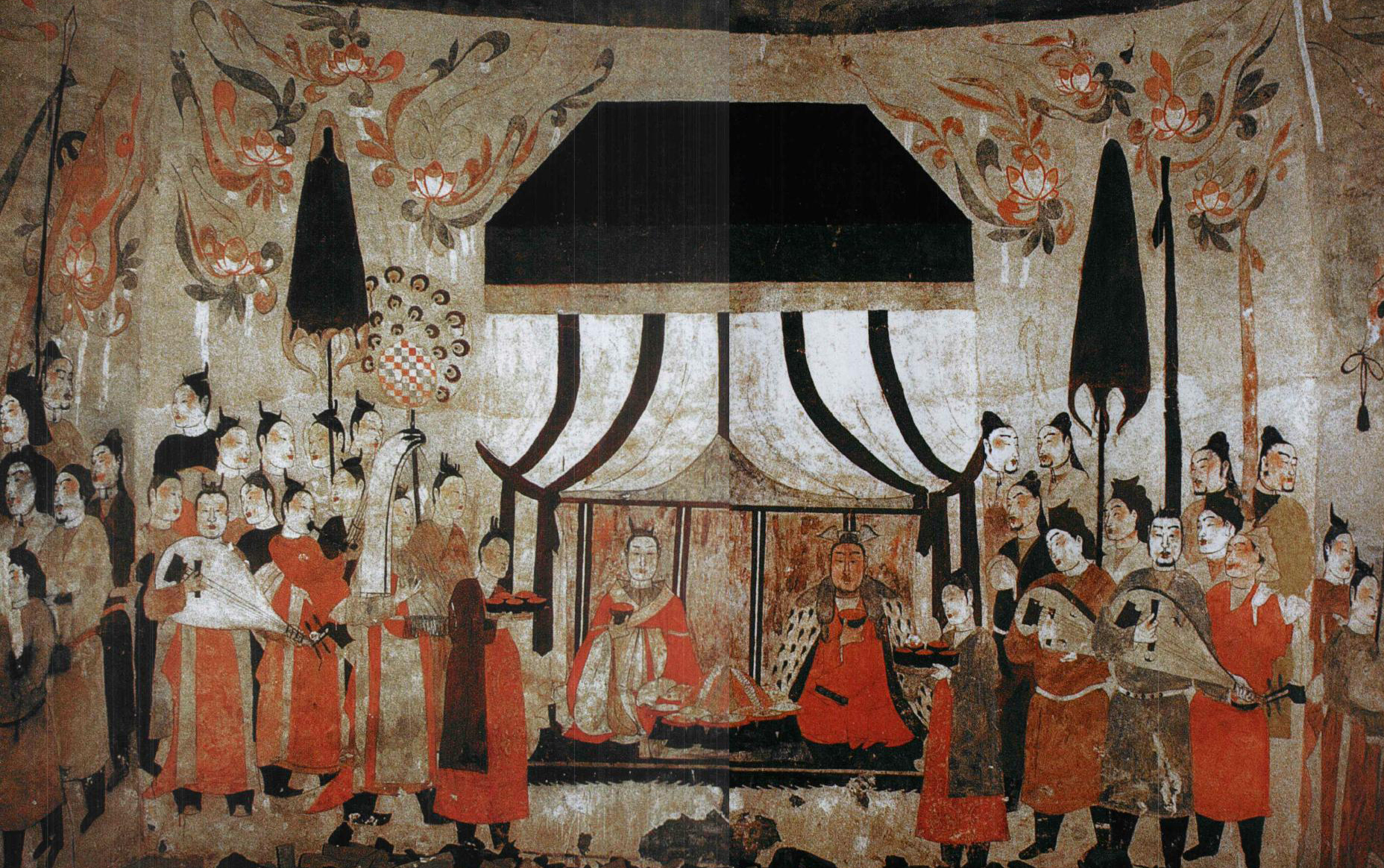
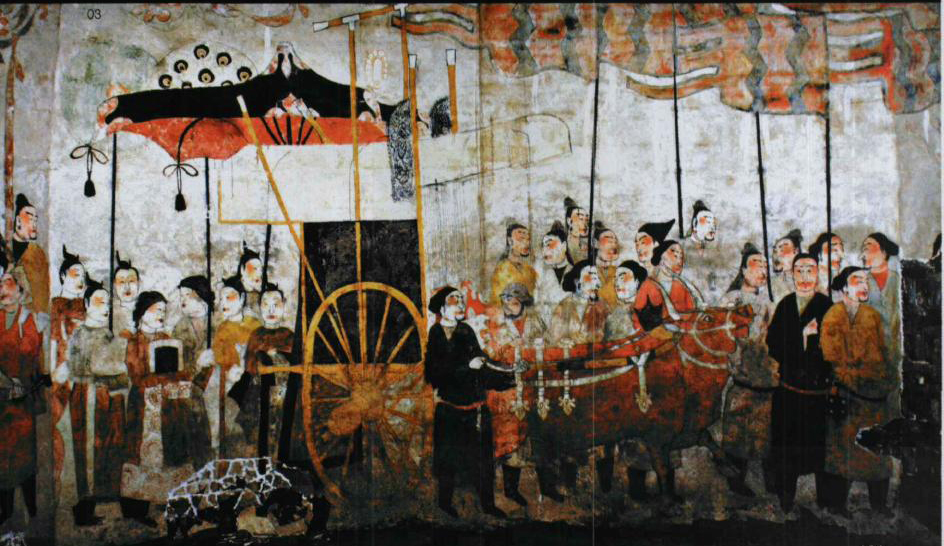
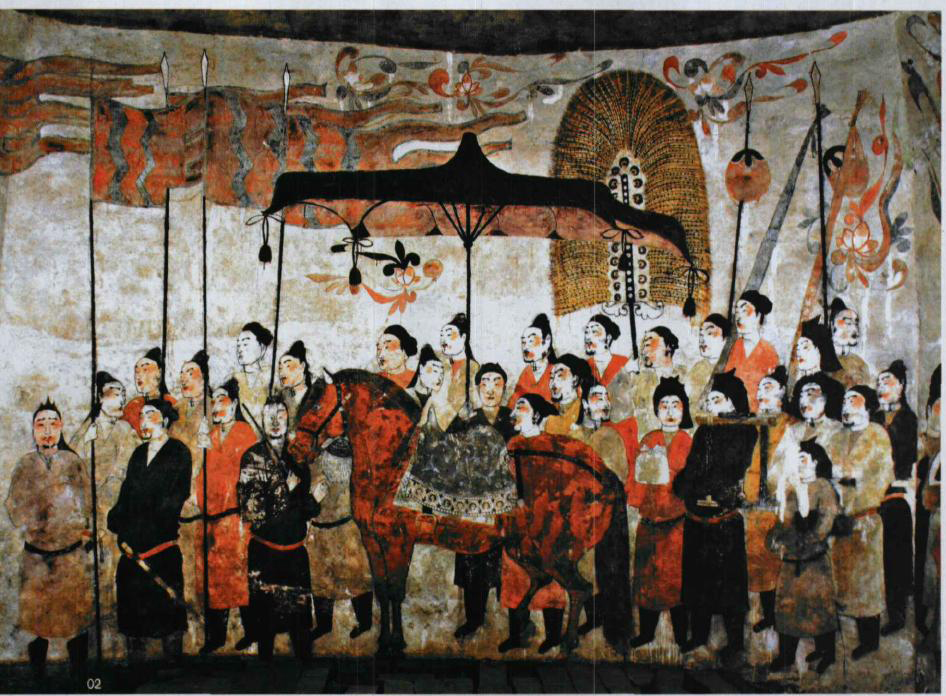
Mural paintings of court life in Xu Xianxiu's Tomb, Northern Qi dynasty, 571 AD, located in Taiyuan, Shanxi province, China

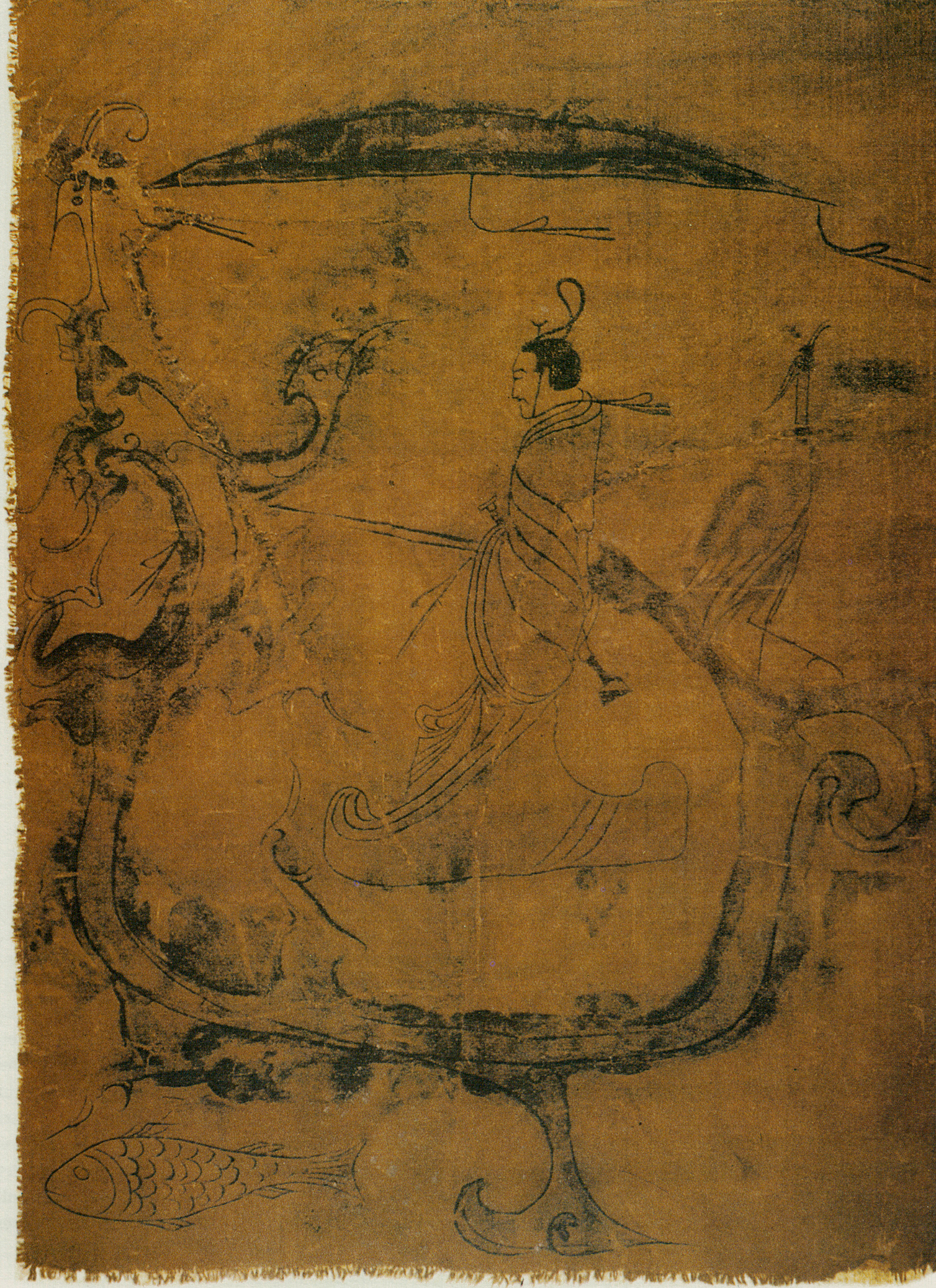
Silk painting depicting a man riding a dragon, painting on silk, dated to 5th–3rd century BC, Warring States period, from Zidanku Tomb no. 1 in Changsha, Hunan Province

The history of Eastern painting includes a vast range of influences from various cultures and religions. Developments in Eastern painting historically parallel those in Western painting, in general a few centuries earlier. African art, Jewish art, Islamic art, Indonesian art, Indian art, Chinese art, Korean Art, and Japanese art each had significant influence on Western art, and, vice versa.

Chinese painting is one of the oldest continuous artistic traditions in the world. The earliest paintings were not representational but ornamental; they consisted of patterns or designs rather than pictures. Early pottery was painted with spirals, zigzags, dots, or animals. It was only during the Warring States period (403–221 B.C.) that artists began to represent the world around them. Japanese painting is one of the oldest and most highly refined of the Japanese arts, encompassing a wide variety of genre and styles. The history of Japanese painting is a long history of synthesis and competition between native Japanese aesthetics and adaptation of imported ideas. Korean painting, as an independent form, began around 108 B.C., around the fall of Gojoseon, making it one of the oldest in the world. The artwork of that time period evolved into the various styles that characterized the Three Kingdoms of Korea period, most notably the paintings and frescoes that adorn the tombs of Goguryeo's royalty. During the Three Kingdoms period and through the Goryeo dynasty, Korean painting was characterized primarily by a combination of Korean-style landscapes, facial features, Buddhist-centered themes, and an emphasis on celestial observation that was facilitated by the rapid development of Korean astronomy.

=== East Asian ===
Panorama of Along the River During Qing Ming Festival, 18th-century remake of 12th-century Song dynasty original by Chinese artist Zhang Zeduan. The original painting by Zhang is revered by scholars as "one of Chinese civilization's greatest masterpieces." Note: scroll starts from the right.

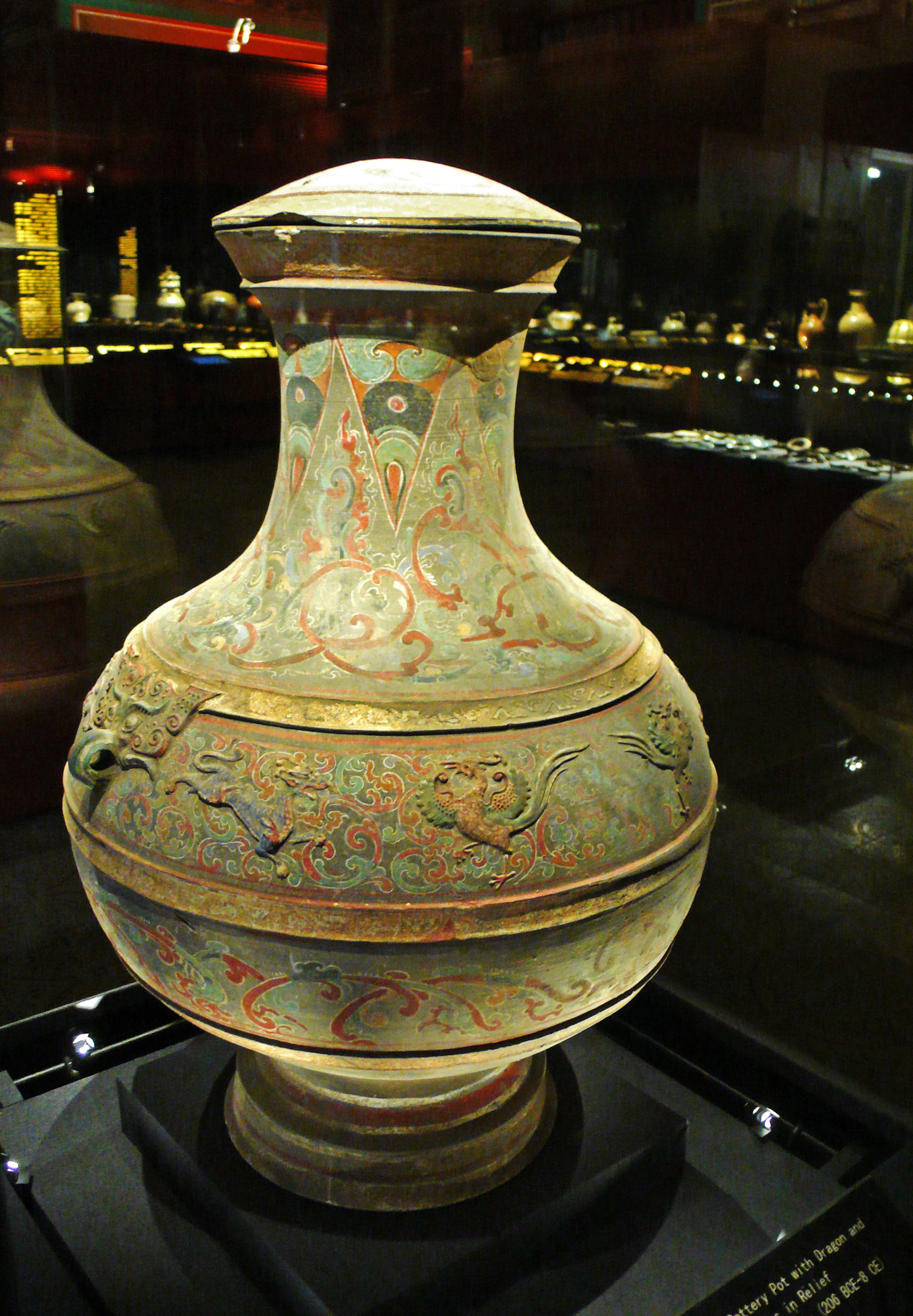
A Chinese painted jar from the Western Han Era (202 BCE – 9 CE)

China, Japan and Korea have a strong tradition in painting which is also highly attached to the art of calligraphy and printmaking (so much that it is commonly seen as painting). Far east traditional painting is characterized by water based techniques, less realism, "elegant" and stylized subjects, graphical approach to depiction, the importance of white space (or negative space) and a preference for landscape (instead of the human figure) as a subject. Beyond ink and color on silk or paper scrolls, gold on lacquer was also a common medium in painted East Asian artwork. Although silk was a somewhat expensive medium to paint upon in the past, the invention of paper during the 1st century AD by the Han court eunuch Cai Lun provided not only a cheap and widespread medium for writing, but also a cheap and widespread medium for painting (making it more accessible to the public).

The ideologies of Confucianism, Daoism, and Buddhism played important roles in East Asian art. Medieval Song dynasty painters such as Lin Tinggui and his Luohan Laundering (housed in the Smithsonian Freer Gallery of Art) of the 12th century are excellent examples of Buddhist ideas fused into classical Chinese artwork. In the latter painting on silk (image and description provided in the link), bald-headed Buddhist Luohan are depicted in a practical setting of washing clothes by a river. However, the painting itself is visually stunning, with the Luohan portrayed in rich detail and bright, opaque colors in contrast to a hazy, brown, and bland wooded environment. Also, the tree tops are shrouded in swirling fog, providing the common "negative space" mentioned above in East Asian Art.

In Japonisme, late 19th-century Post-Impressionists like Van Gogh and Henri de Toulouse-Lautrec, and tonalists such as James McNeill Whistler, admired early 19th-century Japanese Ukiyo-e artists like Hokusai (1760–1849) and Hiroshige (1797–1858) and were influenced by them.

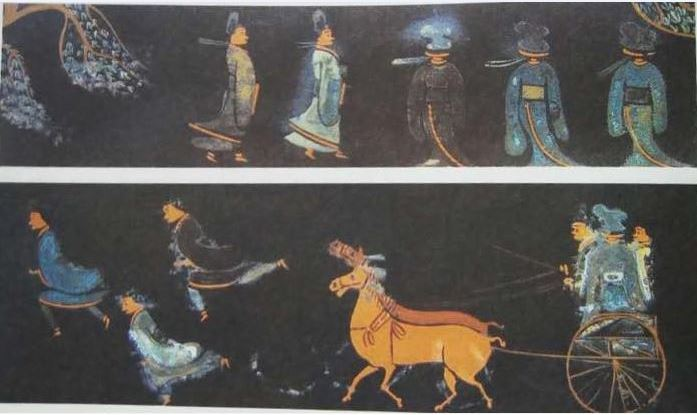
A lacquerware painting from the State of Chu (704–223 BC)

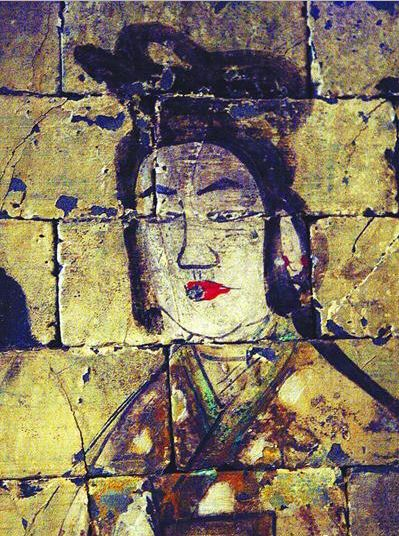
Fresco of a Chinese woman, Western Han (202 BC – 9 AD)

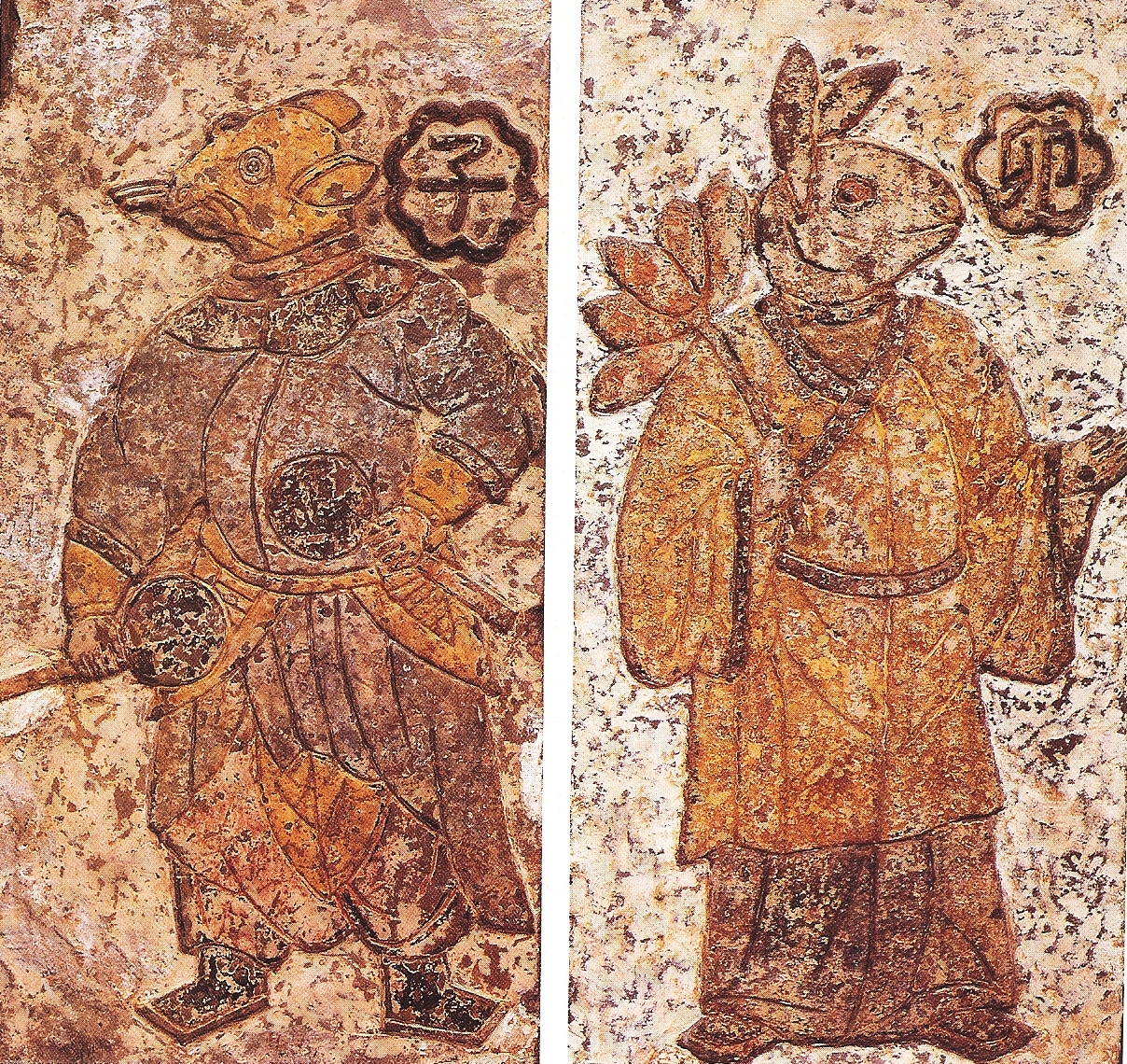
Paintings of guardian spirits, Han dynasty (202 BC – 220 AD)

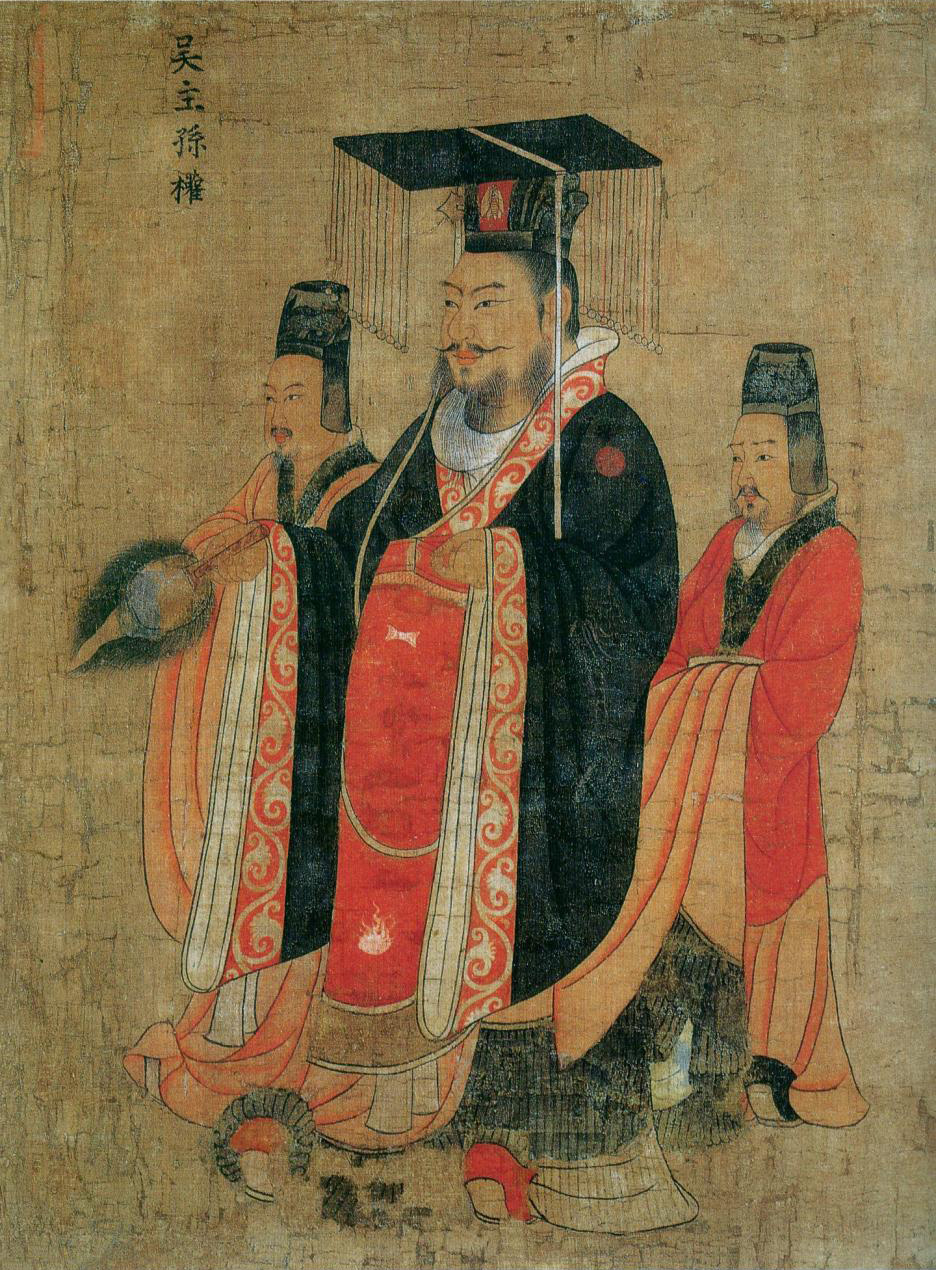
Emperor Sun Quan by Yan Liben (600–673 AD), Tang dynasty

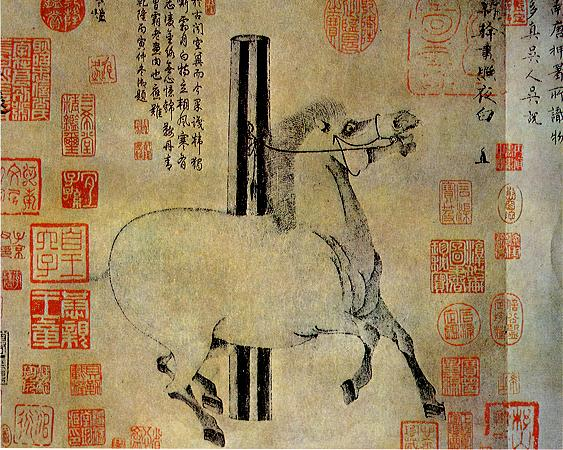
Night-Shining White, by Han Gan (8th century), Tang dynasty

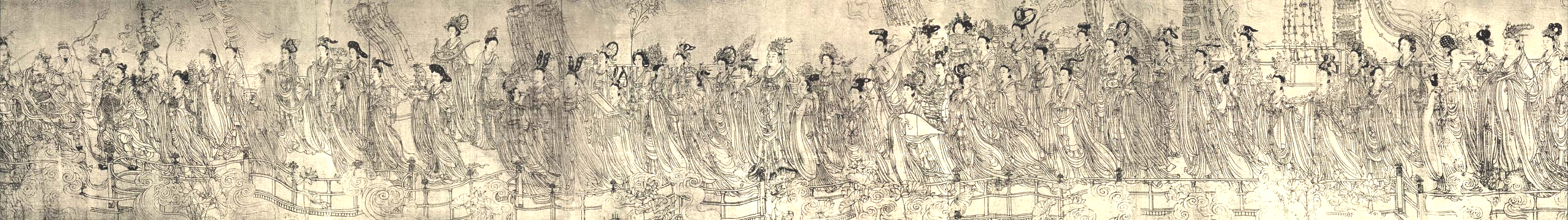
Eighty-Seven Celestials, by Wu Daozi (685–758), Tang dynasty

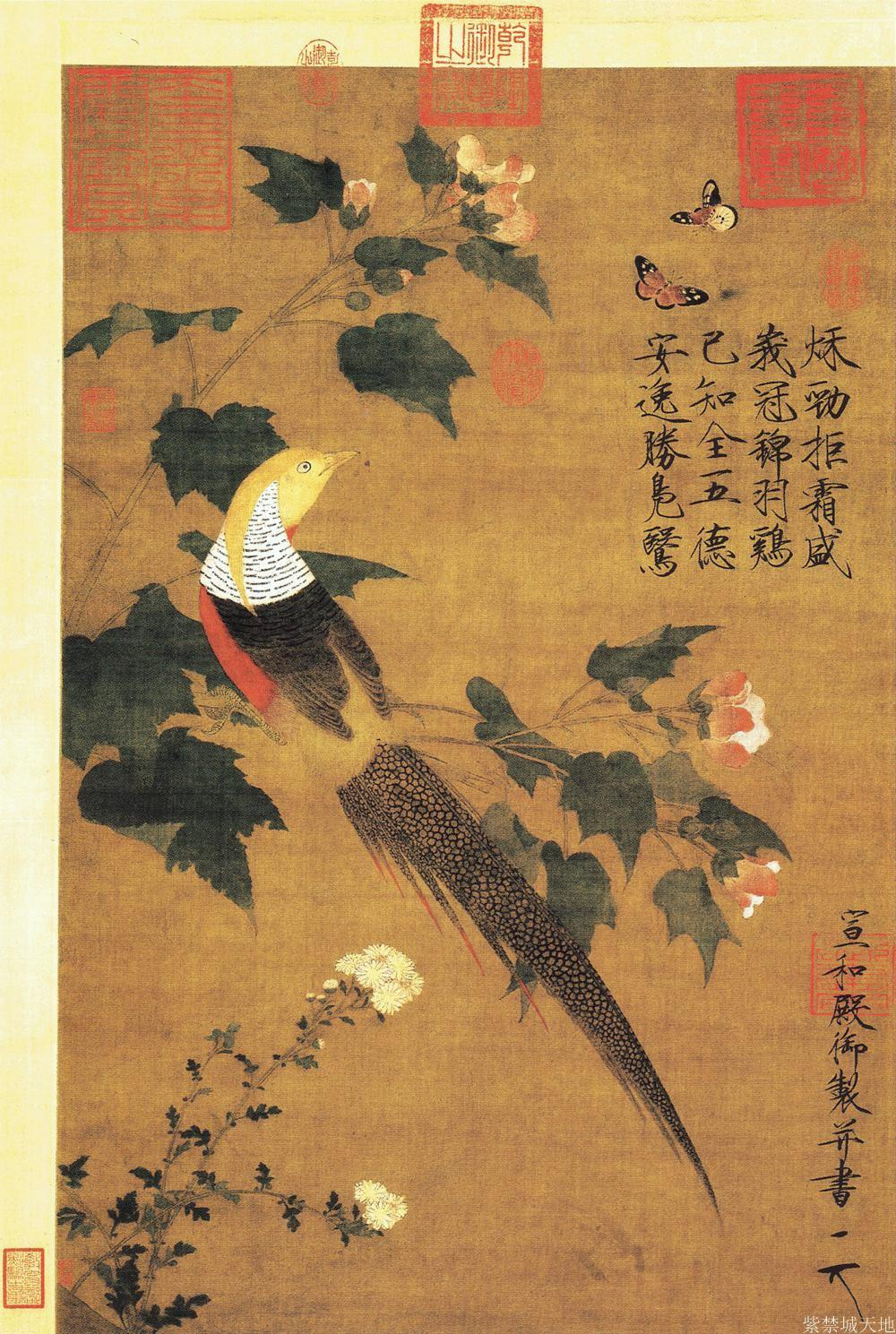
Golden Pheasant and Cotton Rose, by Emperor Huizong of Song (1100–1126 AD), Song dynasty

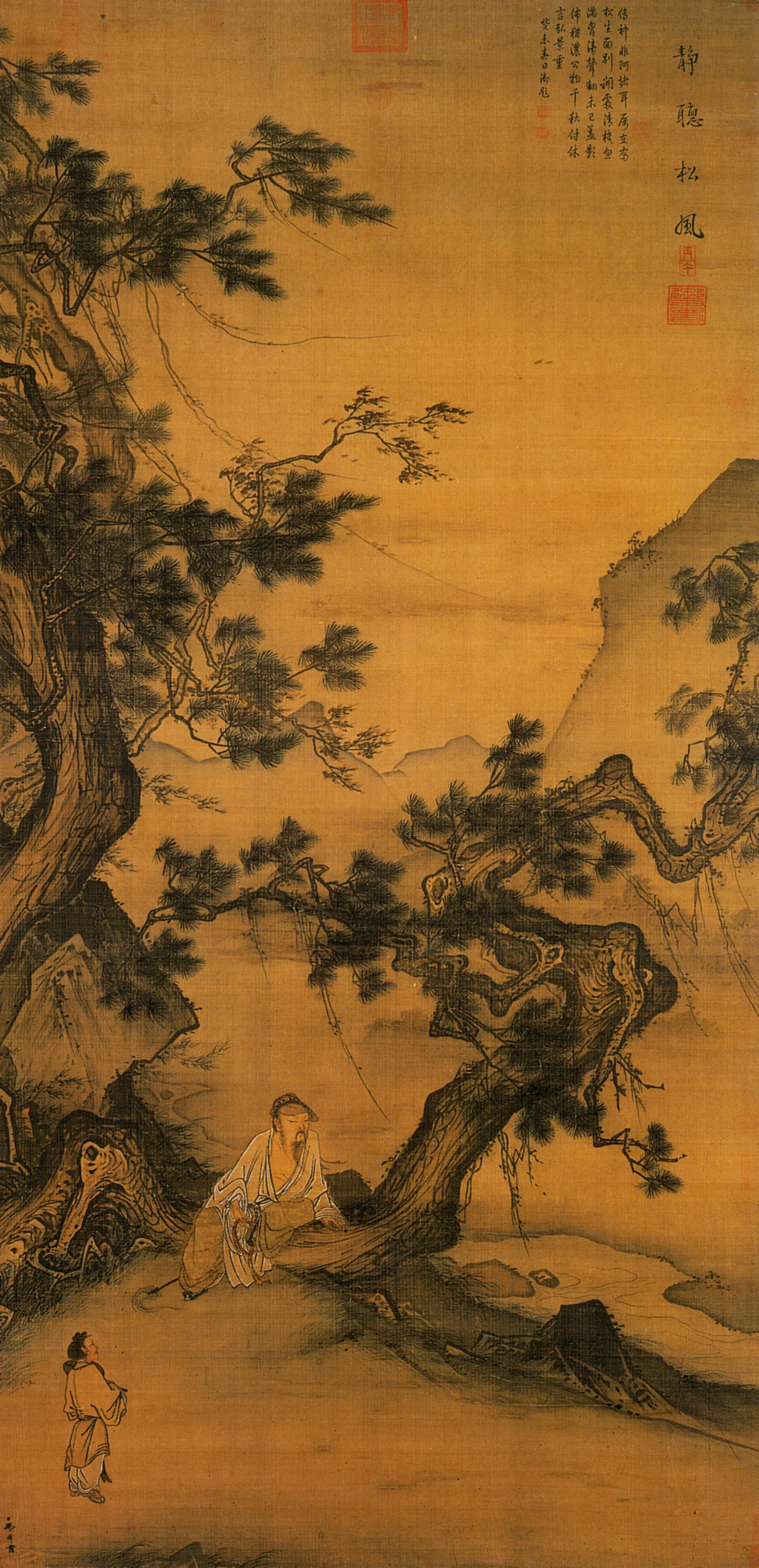
A Man and His Horse in the Wind, by Zhao Mengfu (1254–1322 AD), Chinese

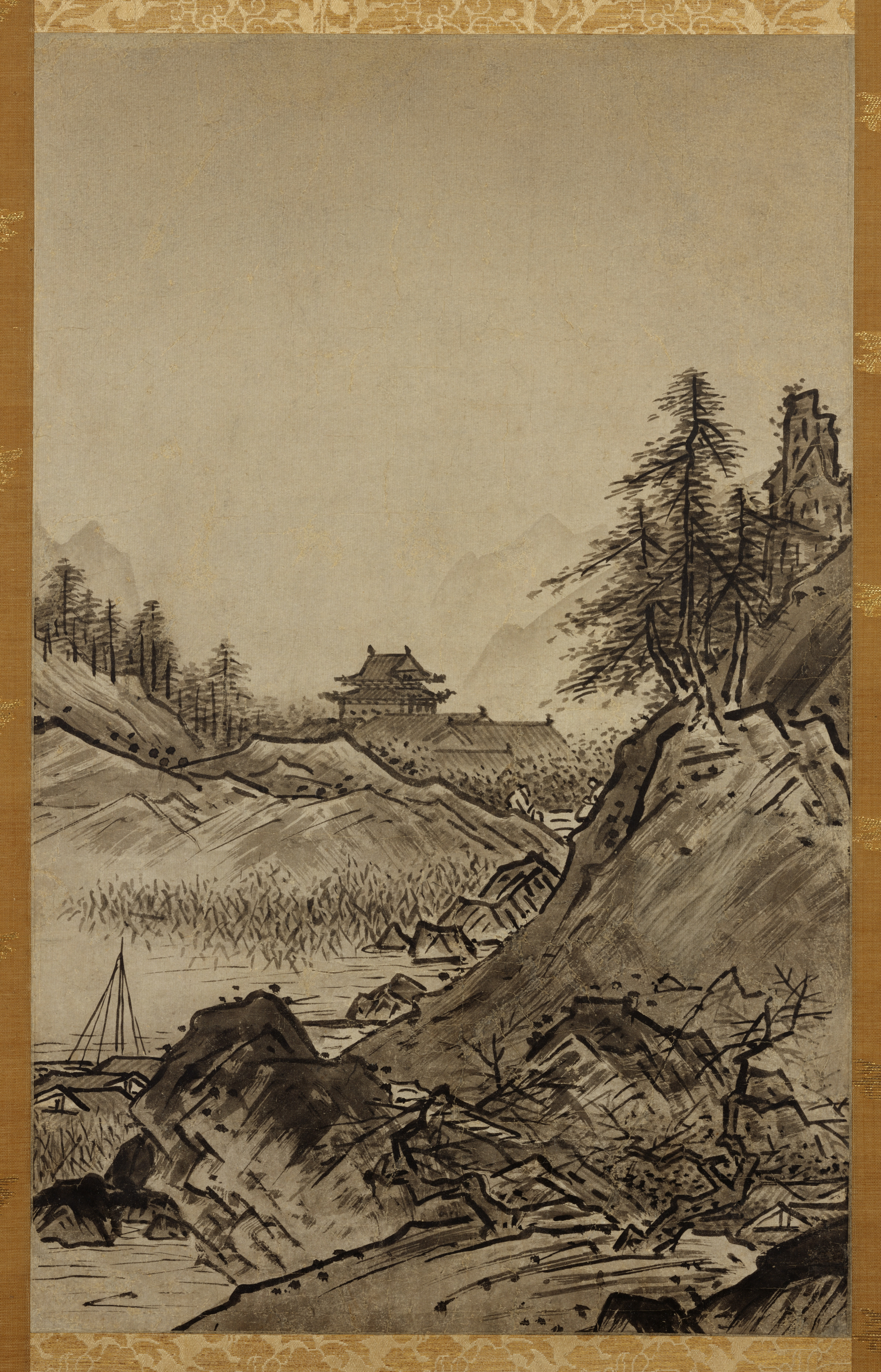
Shukei-sansui (Autumn Landscape), Sesshu Toyo (1420–1506), Japanese

Pine Trees screen by Hasegawa Tōhaku (1539–1610), Japanese

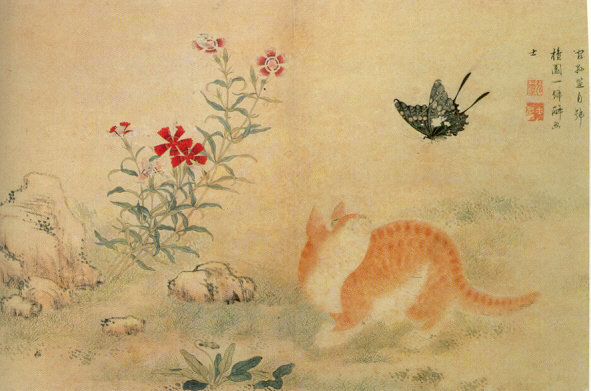
A Cat and a Butterfly, by Kim Hong-do (1745–?), 18th century, Korean

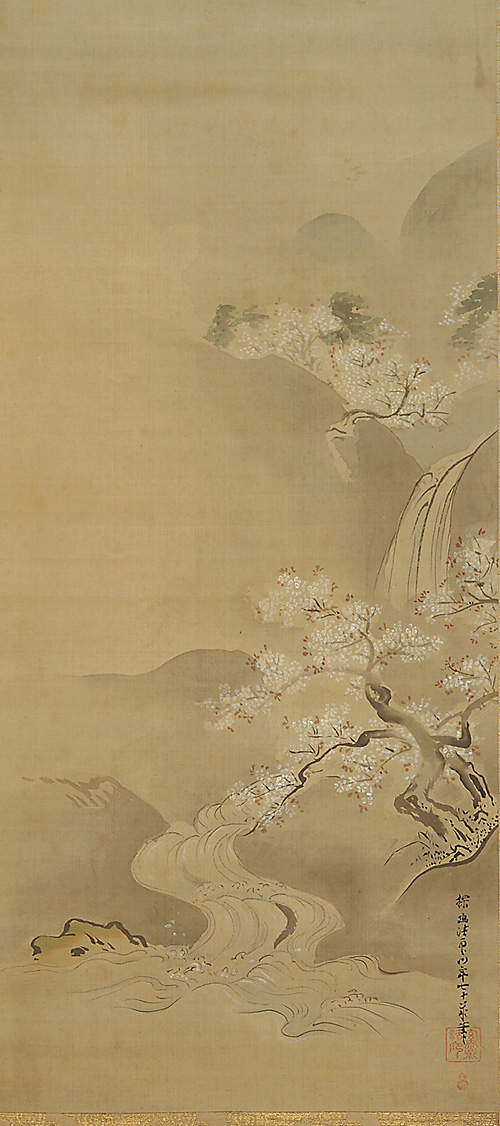
Hanging scroll by Kanō Tanyū (1602–1674), Japanese

==== Chinese ====
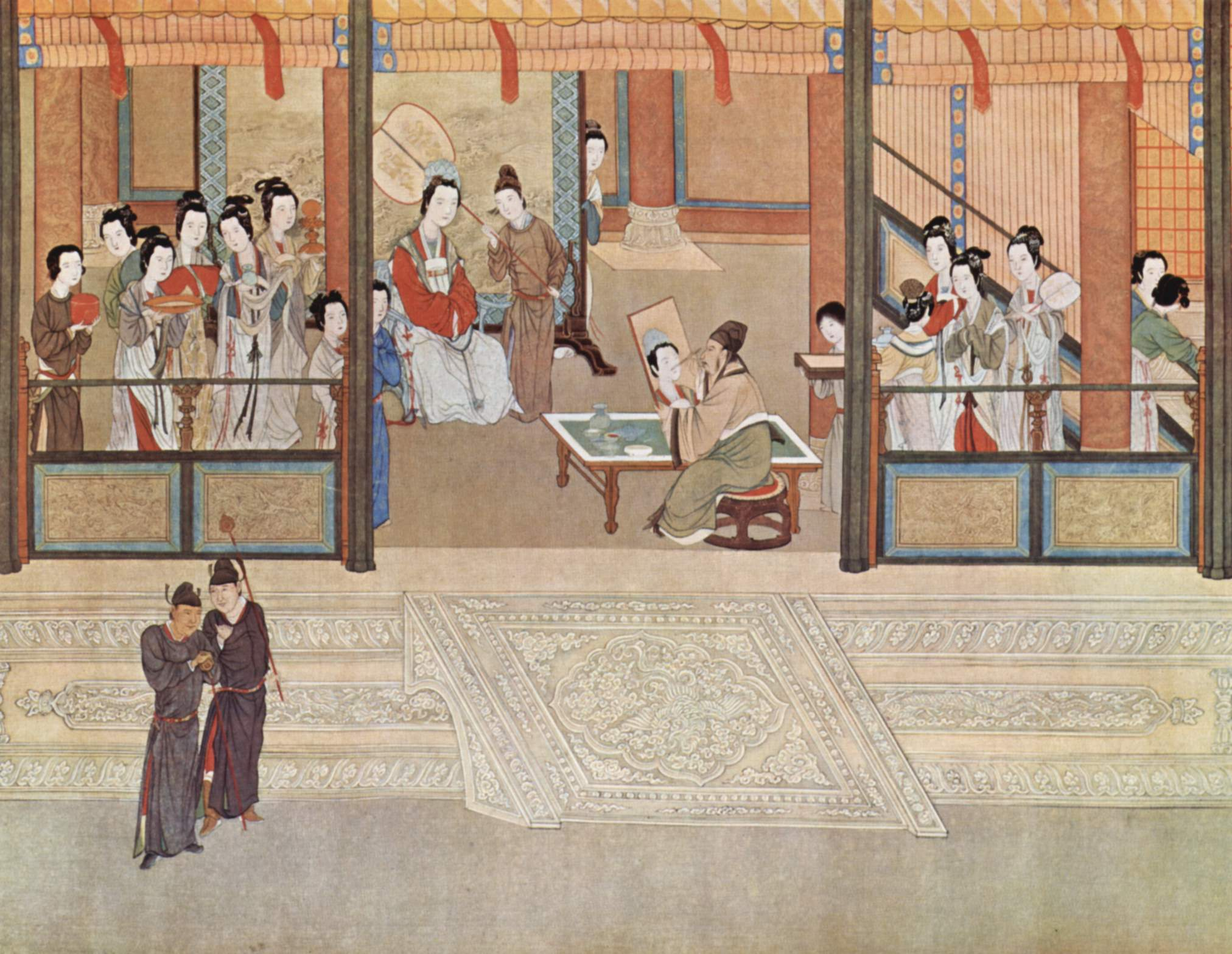
Spring Morning in the Han Palace, by Ming-era artist Qiu Ying (1494–1552 AD)

The earliest surviving examples of Chinese painted artwork date to the Warring States period (481–221 BC), with paintings on silk or tomb murals on rock, brick, or stone. They were often in simplistic stylized format and in more-or-less rudimentary geometric patterns. They often depicted mythological creatures, domestic scenes, labor scenes, or palatial scenes filled with officials at court. Artwork during this period and the subsequent Qin dynasty (221–207 BC) and Han dynasty (202 BC – 220 AD) was made not as a means in and of itself or for higher personal expression; rather artwork was created to symbolize and honor funerary rites, representations of mythological deities or spirits of ancestors, etc. Paintings on silk of court officials and domestic scenes could be found during the Han dynasty, along with scenes of men hunting on horseback or partaking in military parade. There was also painting on three dimensional works of art like figurines and statues, such as the original-painted colors covering the soldier and horse statues of the Terracotta Army. During the social and cultural climate of the ancient Eastern Jin dynasty (316 – 420 AD) based at Nanjing in the south, painting became one of the official pastimes of Confucian-taught bureaucratic officials and aristocrats (along with music played by the guqin zither, writing fanciful calligraphy, and writing and reciting of poetry). Painting became a common form of artistic self-expression, and during this period painters at court or amongst elite social circuits were judged and ranked by their peers.

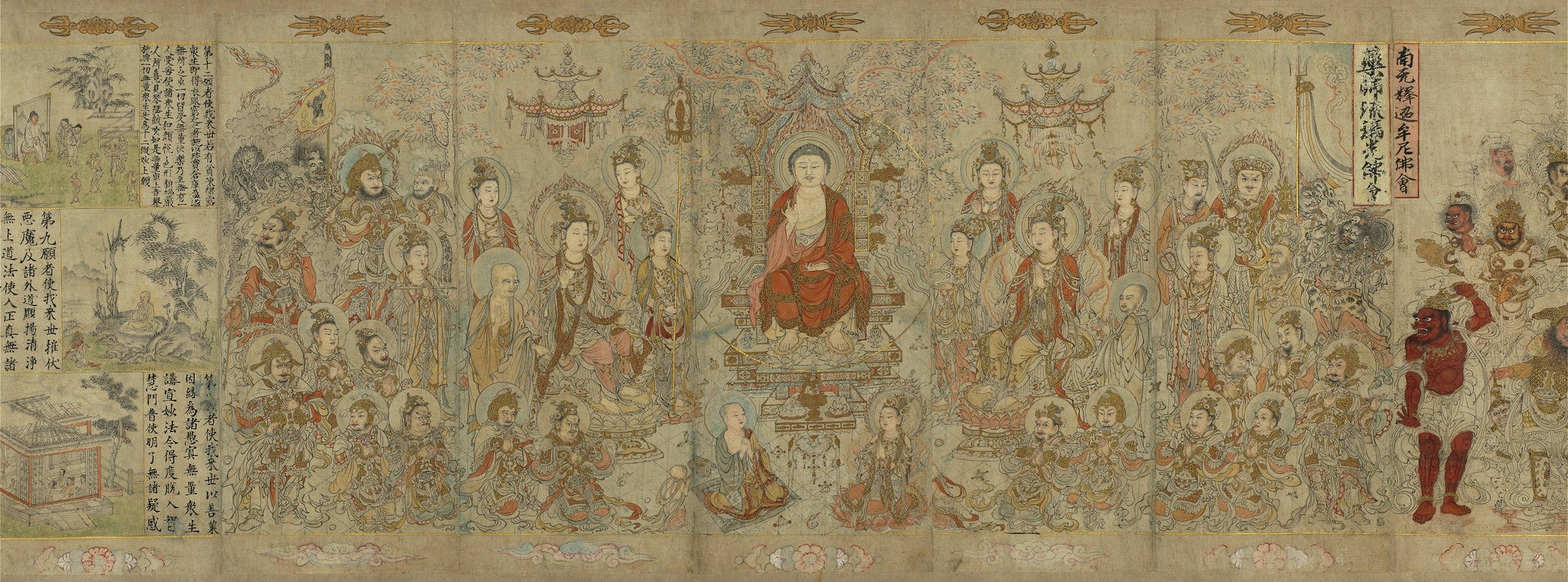
The Sakyamuni Buddha, by Zhang Shengwen, 1173–1176 AD, Song dynasty period.

The establishment of classical Chinese landscape painting is accredited largely to the Eastern Jin dynasty artist Gu Kaizhi (344 – 406 AD), one of the most famous artists of Chinese history. Like the elongated scroll scenes of Kaizhi, Tang dynasty (618–907 AD) Chinese artists like Wu Daozi painted vivid and highly detailed artwork on long horizontal handscrolls (which were very popular during the Tang), such as his Eighty Seven Celestial People. Painted artwork during the Tang period pertained the effects of an idealized landscape environment, with sparse numbers of objects, persons, or amount of activity, as well as monochromatic in nature (example: the murals of Prince Yide's tomb in the Qianling Mausoleum). There were also figures such as early Tang-era painter Zhan Ziqian, who painted superb landscape paintings that were well ahead of his day in portrayal of realism. However, landscape art did not reach greater level of maturity and realism in general until the Five Dynasties and Ten Kingdoms period (907–960 AD). During this time, there were exceptional landscape painters like Dong Yuan (refer to this article for an example of his artwork), and those who painted more vivid and realistic depictions of domestic scenes, like Gu Hongzhong and his Night Revels of Han Xizai.

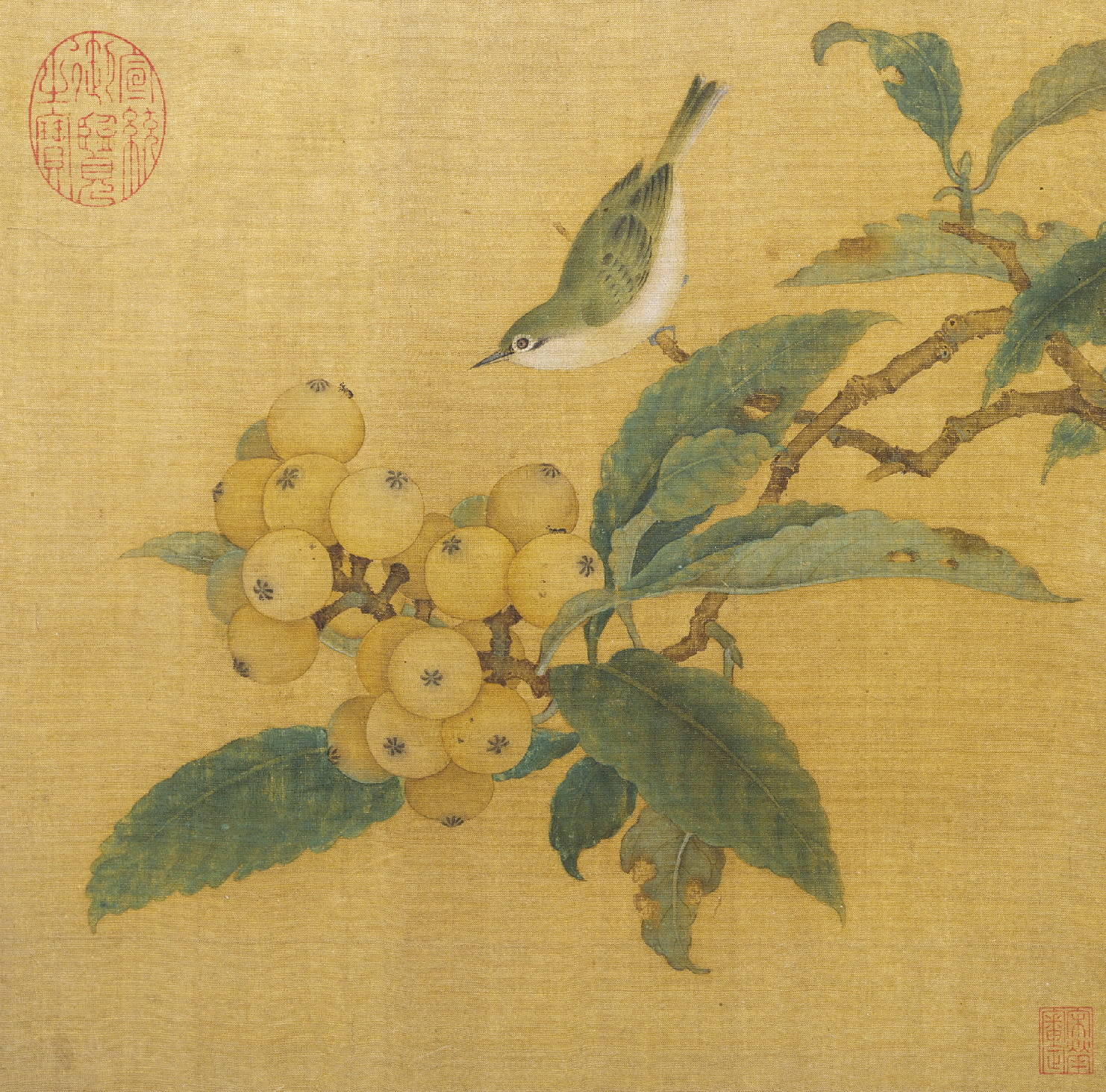
Loquats and Mountain Bird, anonymous artist of the Southern Song dynasty; paintings in leaf album style such as this were popular in the Southern Song (1127–1279).

During the Chinese Song dynasty (960–1279 AD), not only landscape art was improved upon, but portrait painting became more standardized and sophisticated than before (for example, refer to Emperor Huizong of Song), and reached its classical age maturity during the Ming dynasty (1368–1644 AD). During the late 13th century and first half of the 14th century, Chinese under the Mongol-controlled Yuan dynasty were not allowed to enter higher posts of government (reserved for Mongols or other ethnic groups from Central Asia), and the Imperial examination was ceased for the time being. Many Confucian-educated Chinese who now lacked profession turned to the arts of painting and theatre instead, as the Yuan period became one of the most vibrant and abundant eras for Chinese artwork. An example of such would be Qian Xuan (1235–1305 AD), who was an official of the Song dynasty, but out of patriotism, refused to serve the Yuan court and dedicated himself to painting. Examples of superb art from this period include the rich and detailed painted murals of the Yongle Palace, or "Dachunyang Longevity Palace", of 1262 AD, a UNESCO World Heritage site.

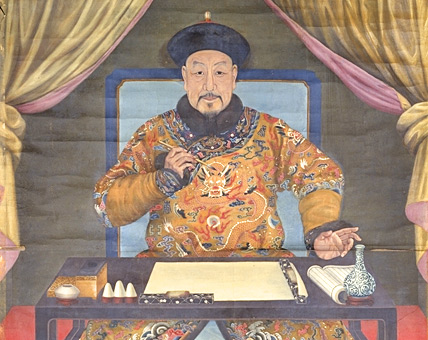
Qianlong Emperor Practicing Calligraphy, mid-18th century.

Although high level of stylization, mystical appeal, and surreal elegance were often preferred over realism (such as in shan shui style), beginning with the medieval Song dynasty there were many Chinese painters then and afterwards who depicted scenes of nature that were vividly real. Later Ming dynasty artists would take after this Song dynasty emphasis for intricate detail and realism on objects in nature, especially in depictions of animals (such as ducks, swans, sparrows, tigers, etc.) amongst patches of brightly colored flowers and thickets of brush and wood (a good example would be the anonymous Ming dynasty painting Birds and Plum Blossoms, housed in the Freer Gallery of the Smithsonian Museum in Washington, D.C.). There were many renowned Ming dynasty artists; Qiu Ying is an excellent example of a paramount Ming era painter (famous even in his own day), utilizing in his artwork domestic scenes, bustling palatial scenes, and nature scenes of river valleys and steeped mountains shrouded in mist and swirling clouds. During the Ming dynasty there were also different and rivaling schools of art associated with painting, such as the Wu School and the Zhe School.

Classical Chinese painting continued on into the early modern Qing dynasty, with highly realistic portrait paintings like seen in the late Ming dynasty of the early 17th century. The portraits of Kangxi Emperor, Yongzheng Emperor, and Qianlong Emperor are excellent examples of realistic Chinese portrait painting. During the Qianlong reign period and the continuing 19th century, European Baroque styles of painting had noticeable influence on Chinese portrait paintings, especially with painted visual effects of lighting and shading. Likewise, East Asian paintings and other works of art (such as porcelain and lacquerware) were highly prized in Europe since initial contact in the 16th century.

===== Chinese oil paintings =====
Western techniques of oil paintings began entering China in the 19th century, becoming prevalent among Chinese artists and art students in the early 20th century, coinciding with China's growing engagement with the West. Artists such as Li Tiefu, Hong Yi, Xu Beihong, Yan Wenliang, Lin Fengmian, Fang Ganmin, Pang Yuliang went abroad, predominantly to Paris and Tokyo, to learn Western art. Through them, artistic movements such as Impressionism, Cubism, Fauvism, Post-impressionism grew and thrived in China, only halted by the Second World War and the birth of the People's Republic of China, when modernistic artistic styles were seen as being inconsistent with the prevailing political ideals and realism was the only acceptable artistic form. Nonetheless, the legacy of the close engagement with Western art in the early 20th century endured. Oil paintings survived as an important medium in Chinese artistic scenes; traditional Chinese ink paintings were also changed as a result.

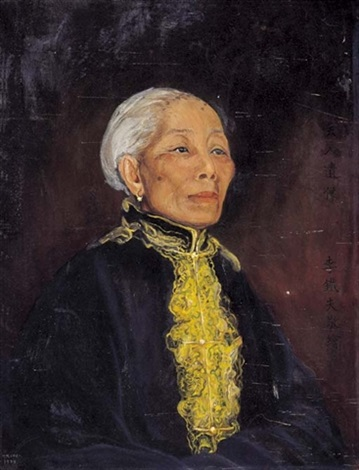
Portrait of Madame Liu, (1942) Li Tiefu oil on canvas

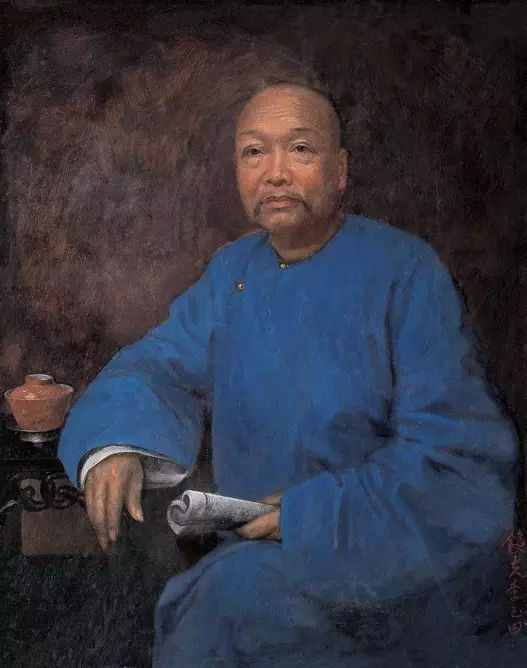
Portrait of Kang Youwei (1904) Li Tiefu oil on canvas

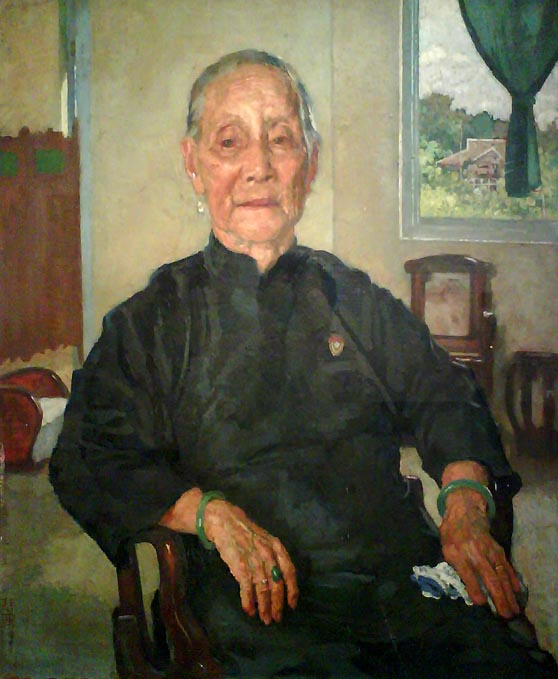
Portrait of Madam Cheng (1941) Oil on board Xu Beihong

==== Japanese ====
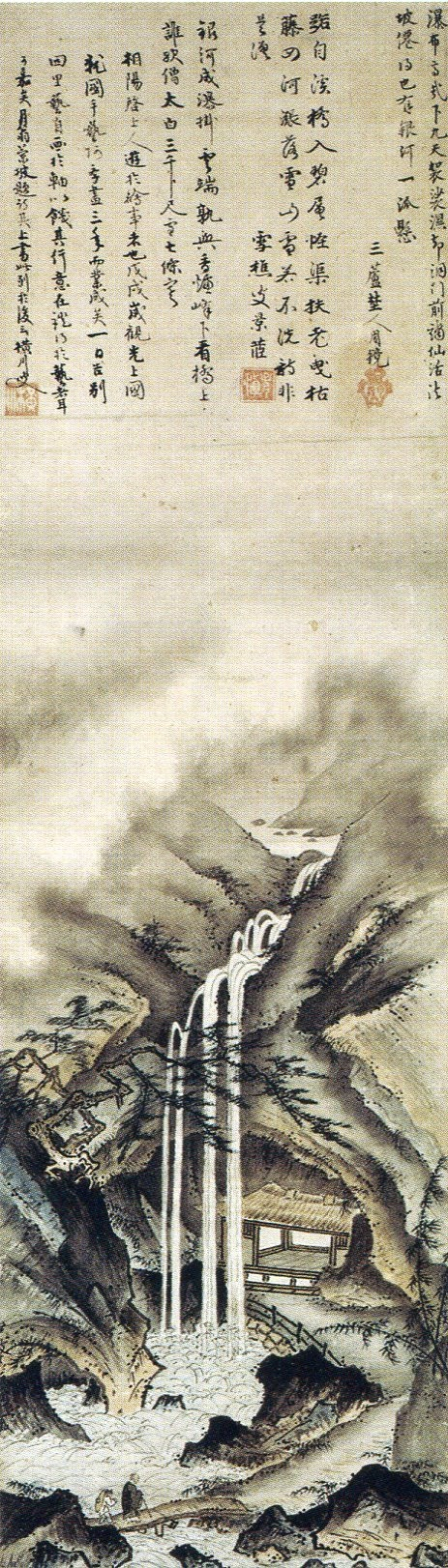
Muromachi period, Shingei (1431–1485), Viewing a Waterfall, Nezu Museum, Tokyo.

Japanese painting (絵画) is one of the oldest and most highly refined of the Japanese arts, encompassing a wide variety of genres and styles. As with Japanese arts in general, Japanese painting developed through a long history of synthesis and competition between native Japanese aesthetics and adaptation of imported ideas. Ukiyo-e, or "pictures of the floating world," is a genre of Japanese woodblock prints (or "woodcuts") and paintings produced between the 17th and 20th centuries, featuring motifs of landscapes, theater, and courtesan districts. It is the main artistic genre of Japanese woodblock printing. Japanese printmaking, especially from the Edo period, exerted enormous influence on French painting over the 19th century. While in the 19th century, Japanese painters developed a new painting technique called yōga that borrowed heavily from western painting techniques and materials, such notable artists include Harada Naojirō, Fujishima Takeji, and Kuroda Seiki.

==== Korean ====
Korean painting, as an independent form, began around 108 B.C., around the fall of Gojoseon, making it one of the oldest in the world. The artwork of that time period evolved into the various styles that characterized the Three Kingdoms of Korea period, most notably the paintings and frescoes that adorn the tombs of Goguryeo's royalty. During the Three Kingdoms period and through the Goryeo dynasty, Korean painting was characterized primarily by a combination of Korean-style landscapes, facial features, Buddhist-centered themes, and an emphasis on celestial observation that was facilitated by the rapid development of Korean astronomy. It wasn't until the Joseon dynasty that Confucian themes began to take root in Korean paintings, used in harmony with indigenous aspects.

The history of Korean painting has been characterized by the use monochromatic works of black brushwork, often on mulberry paper or silk. This style is evident in "Min-Hwa", or colorful folk art, tomb paintings, and ritual and festival arts, both of which incorporated an extensive use of colour.

=== South Asian ===
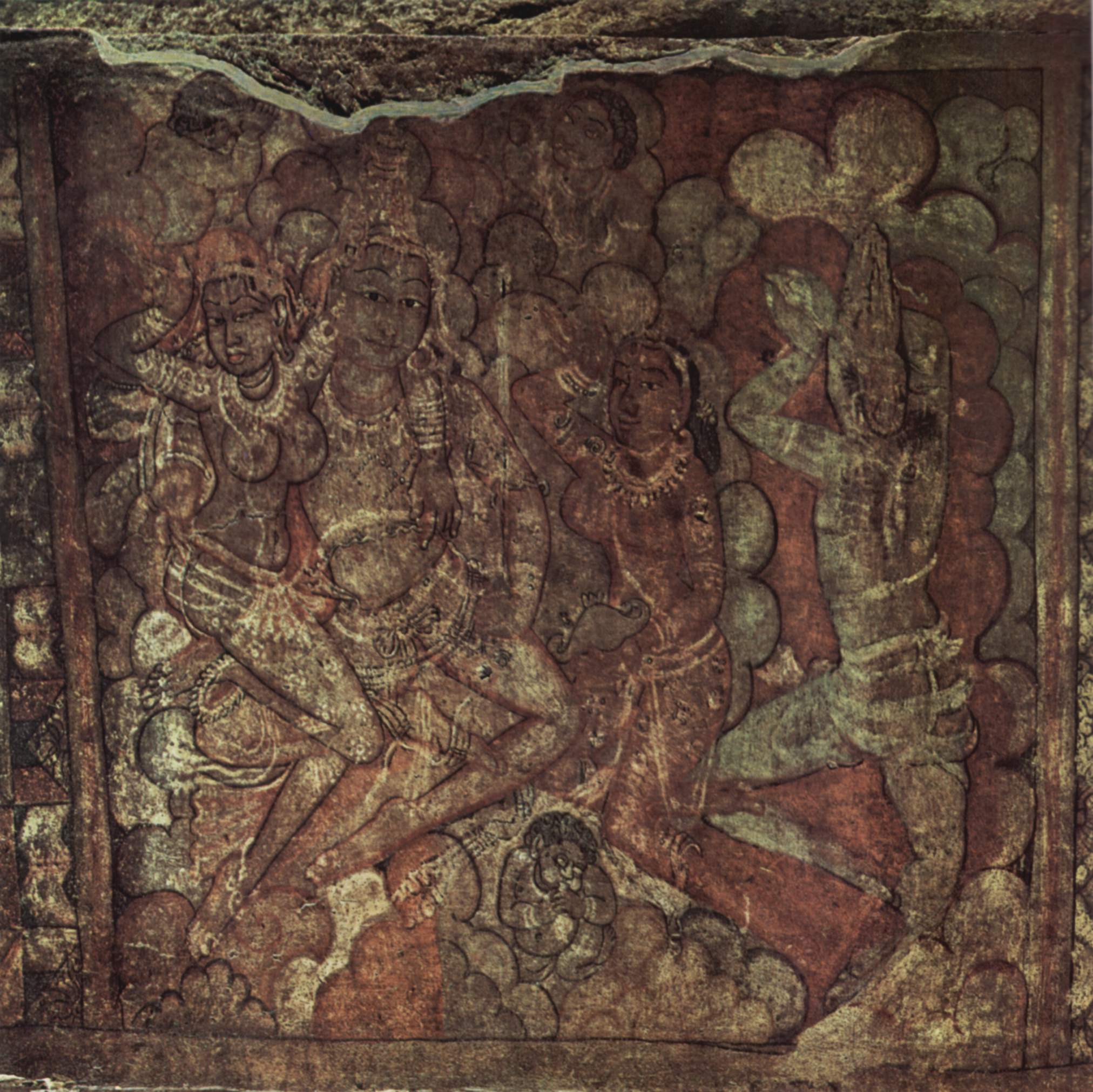
Floating Figures Dancing, a mural of c. 850.

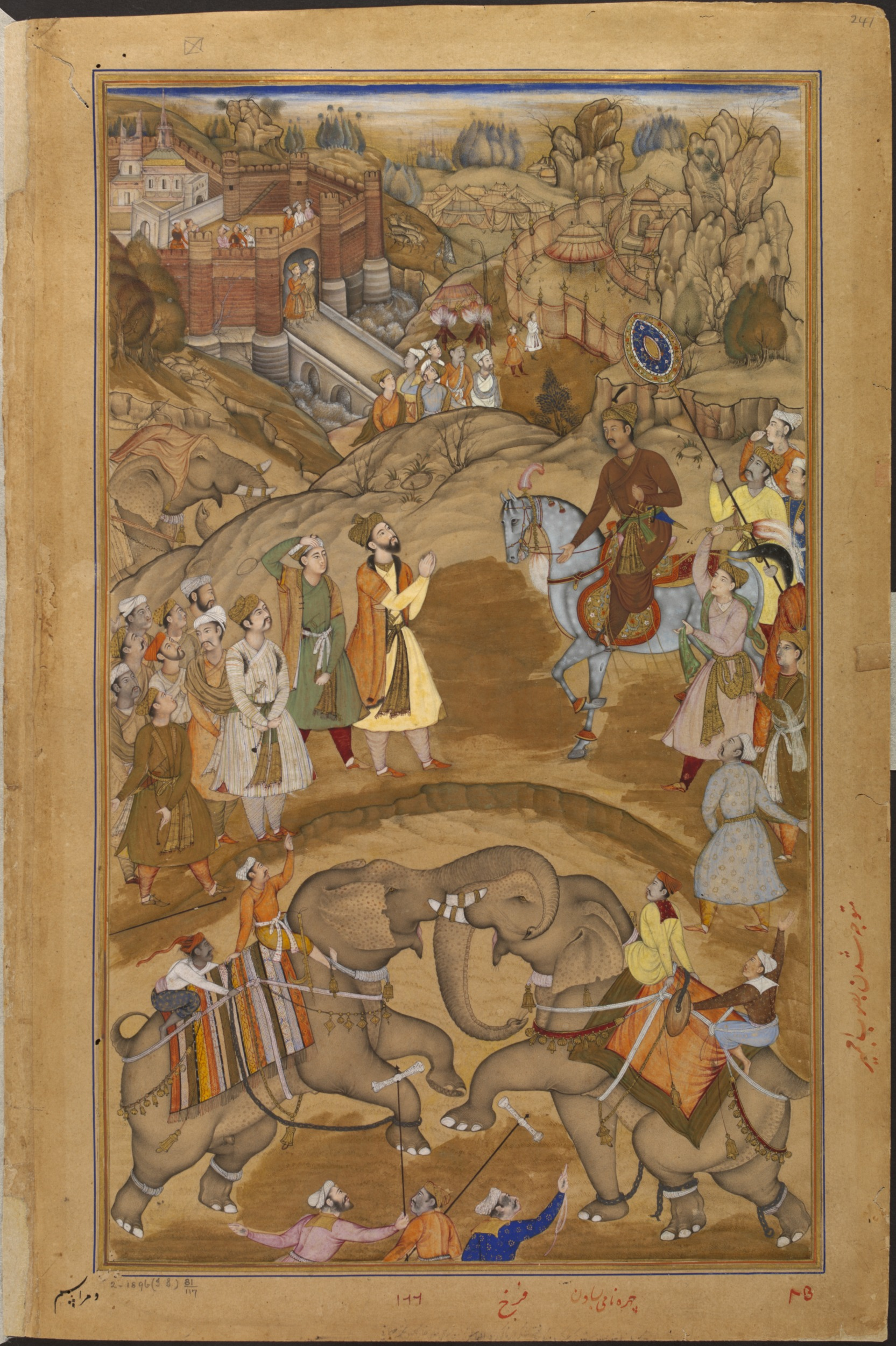
Mughal, Akbar Being Received by Khan Kilan, the Governor of Nagaur, in 1570, Akbarnama

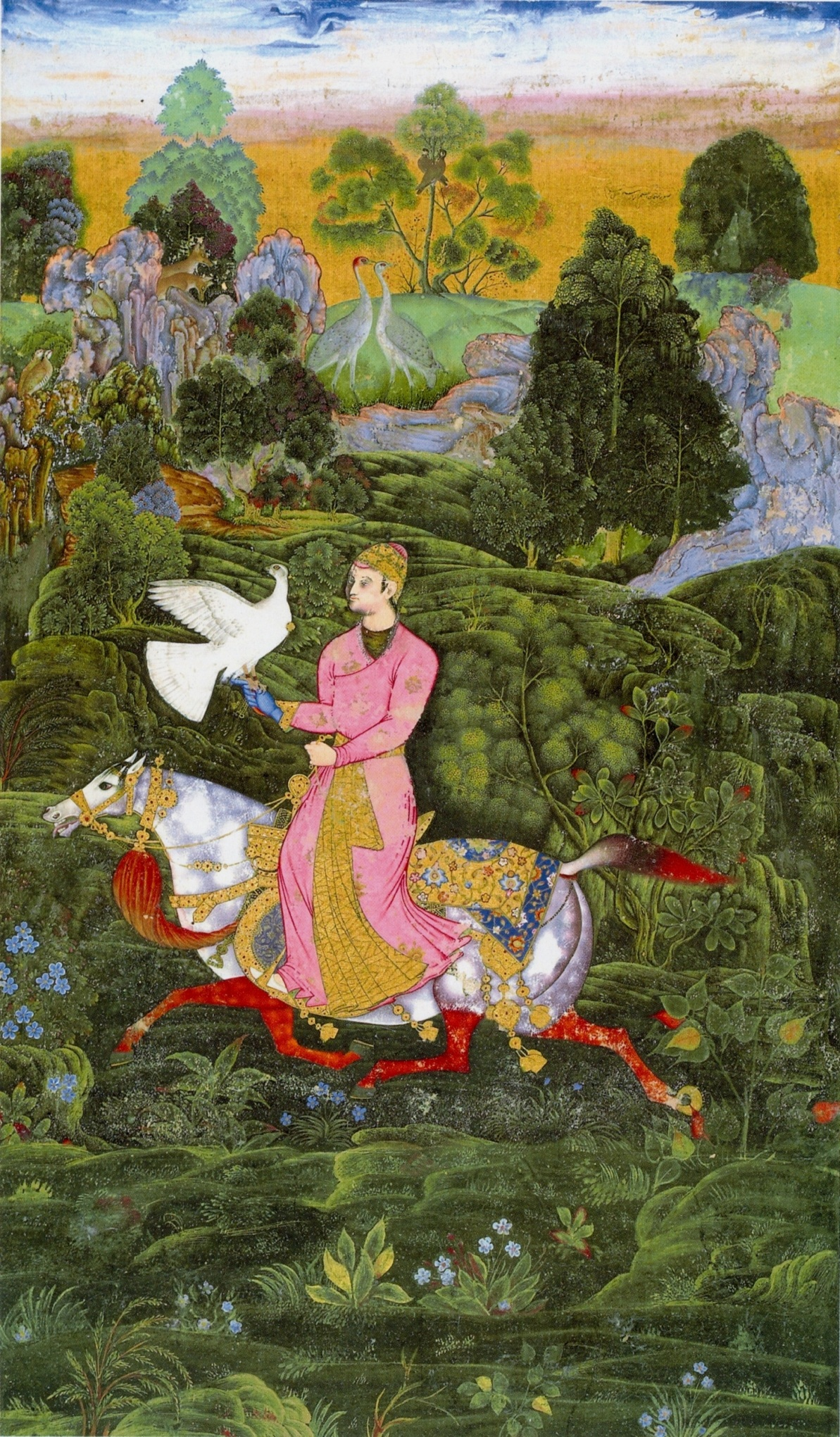
Deccan painting; the young Ibrahim Adil Shah II hawking, c. 1590

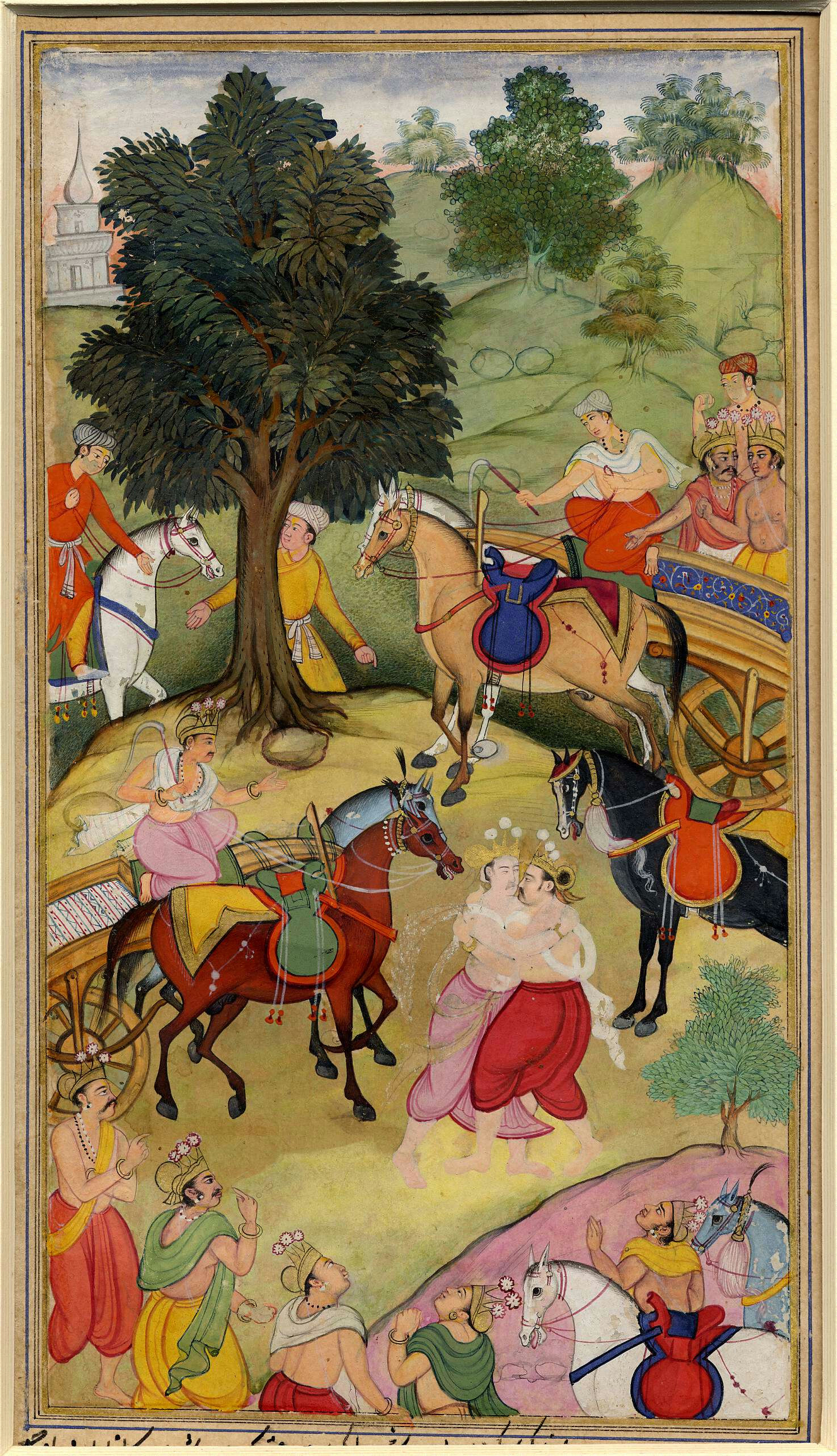
Mughal, Yudishthira wrestling with Karna, 1598

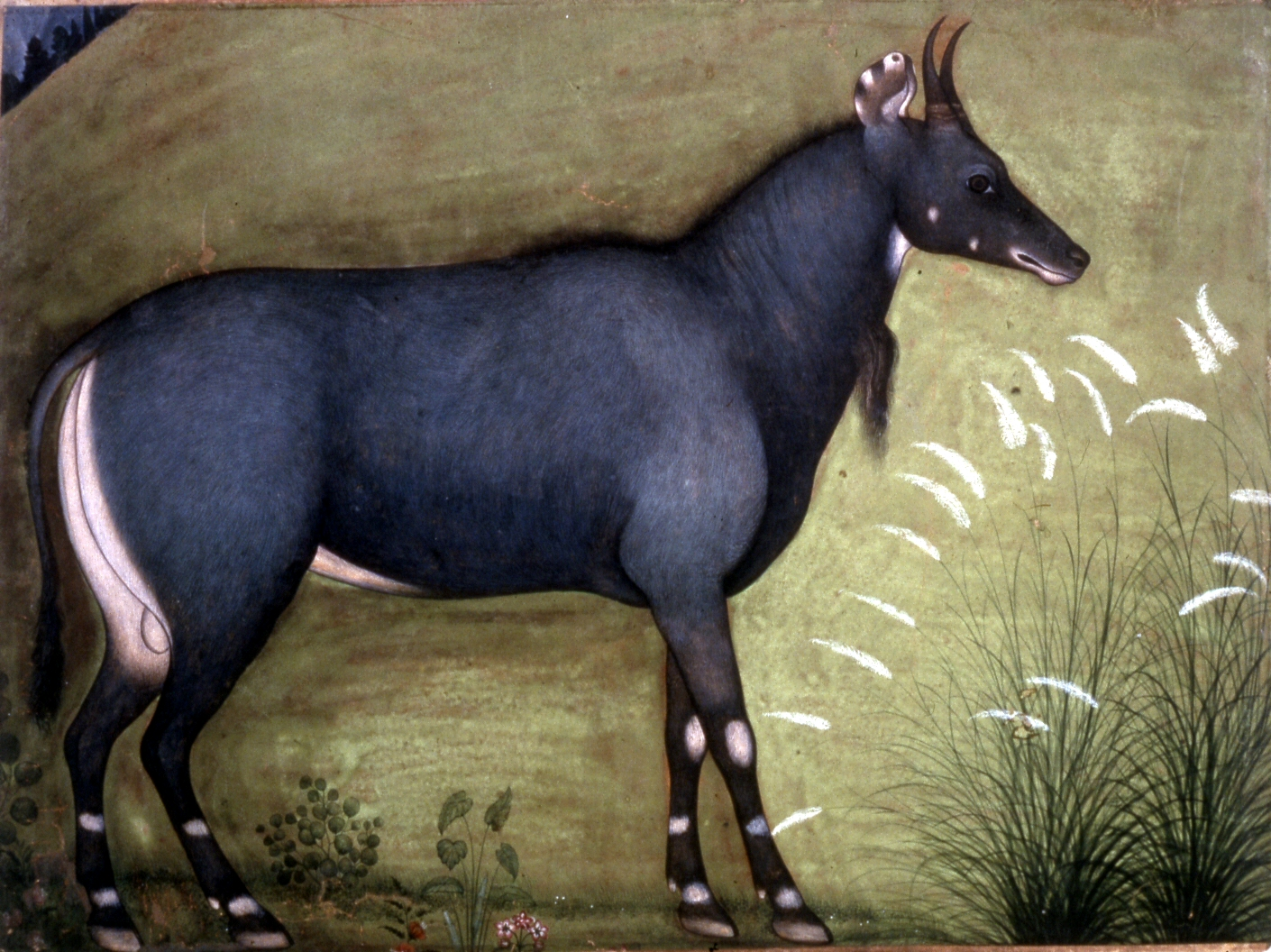
Mughal nilgai, 1625–1650

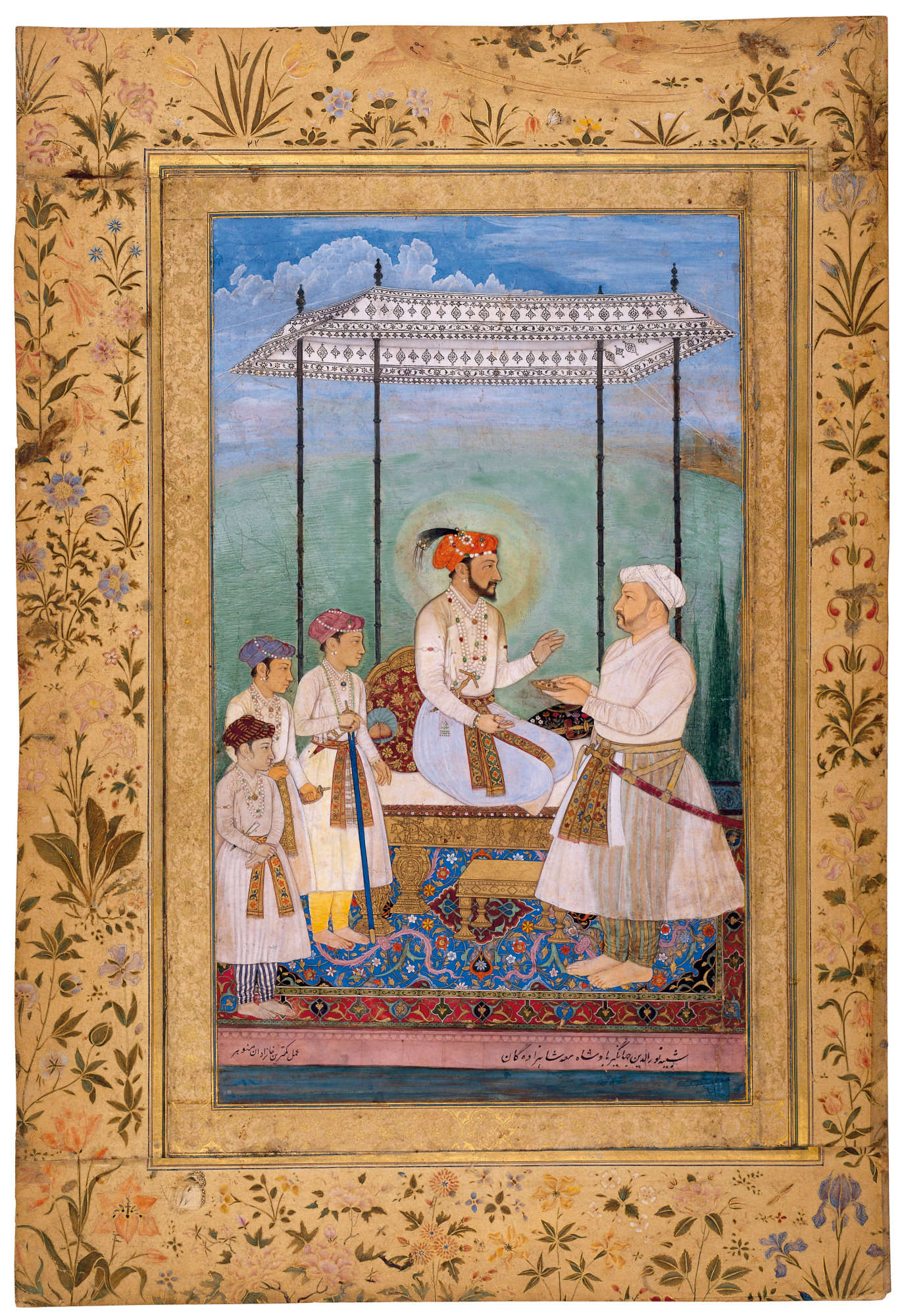
Emperor Shah Jahan and sons, c. 1628 or later. Mughal portraits normally use profile views.

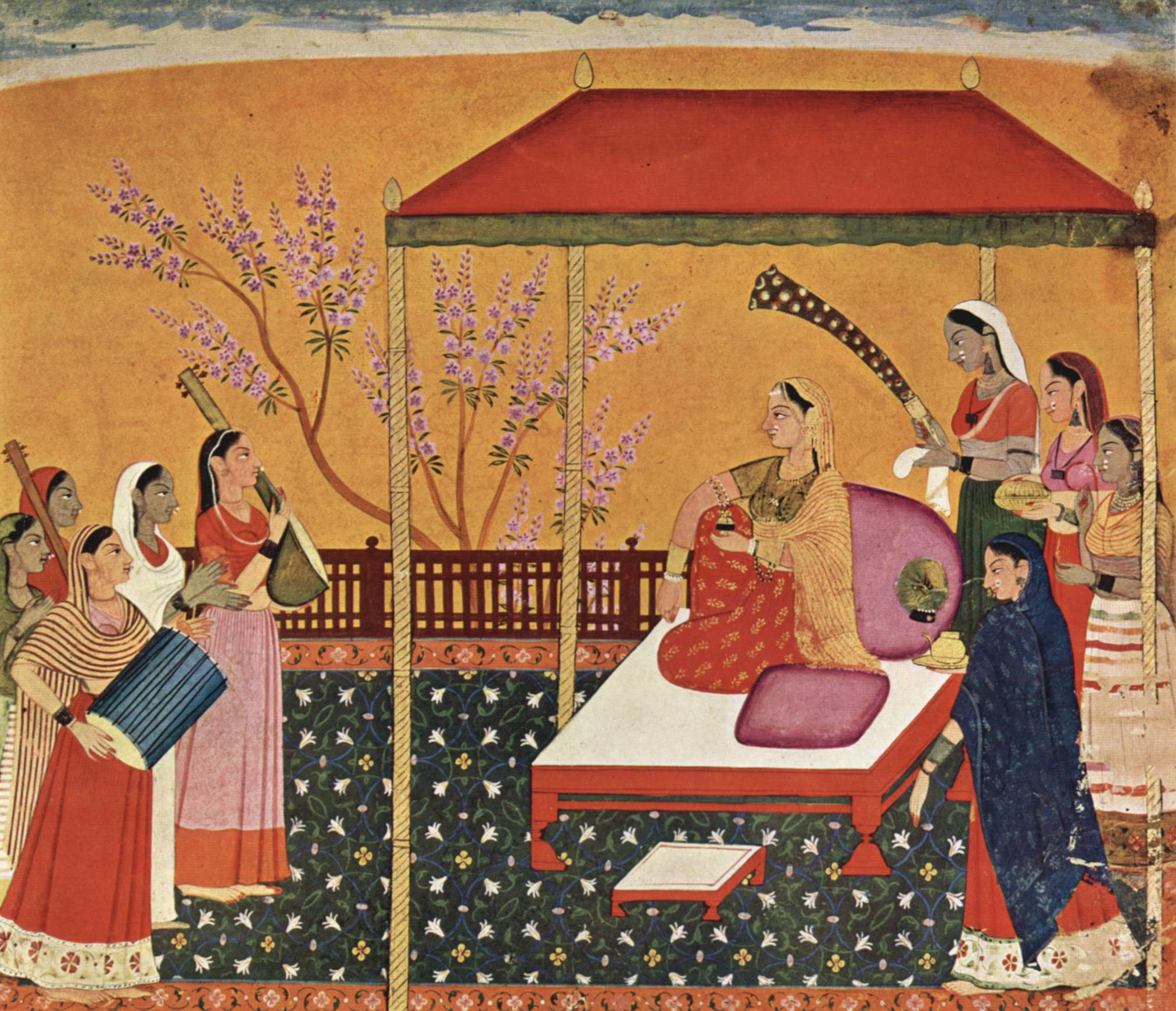
A Lady Listening to Music, c. 1750.

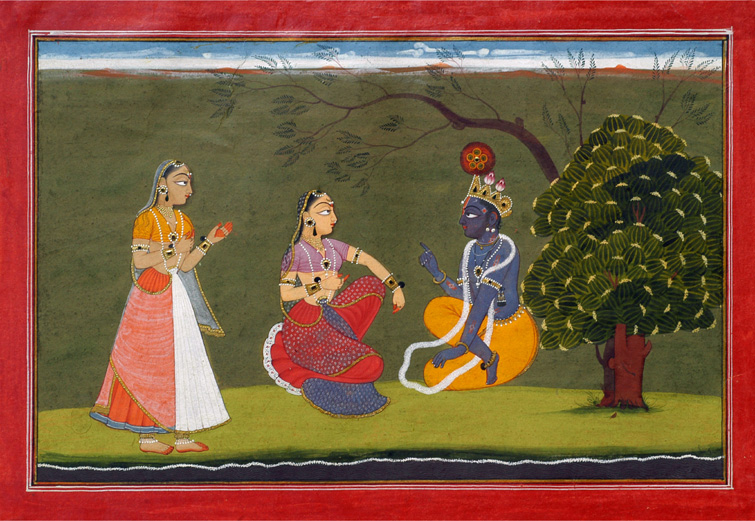
Bahsoli painting of Radha and Krishna in Discussion, c. 1730.

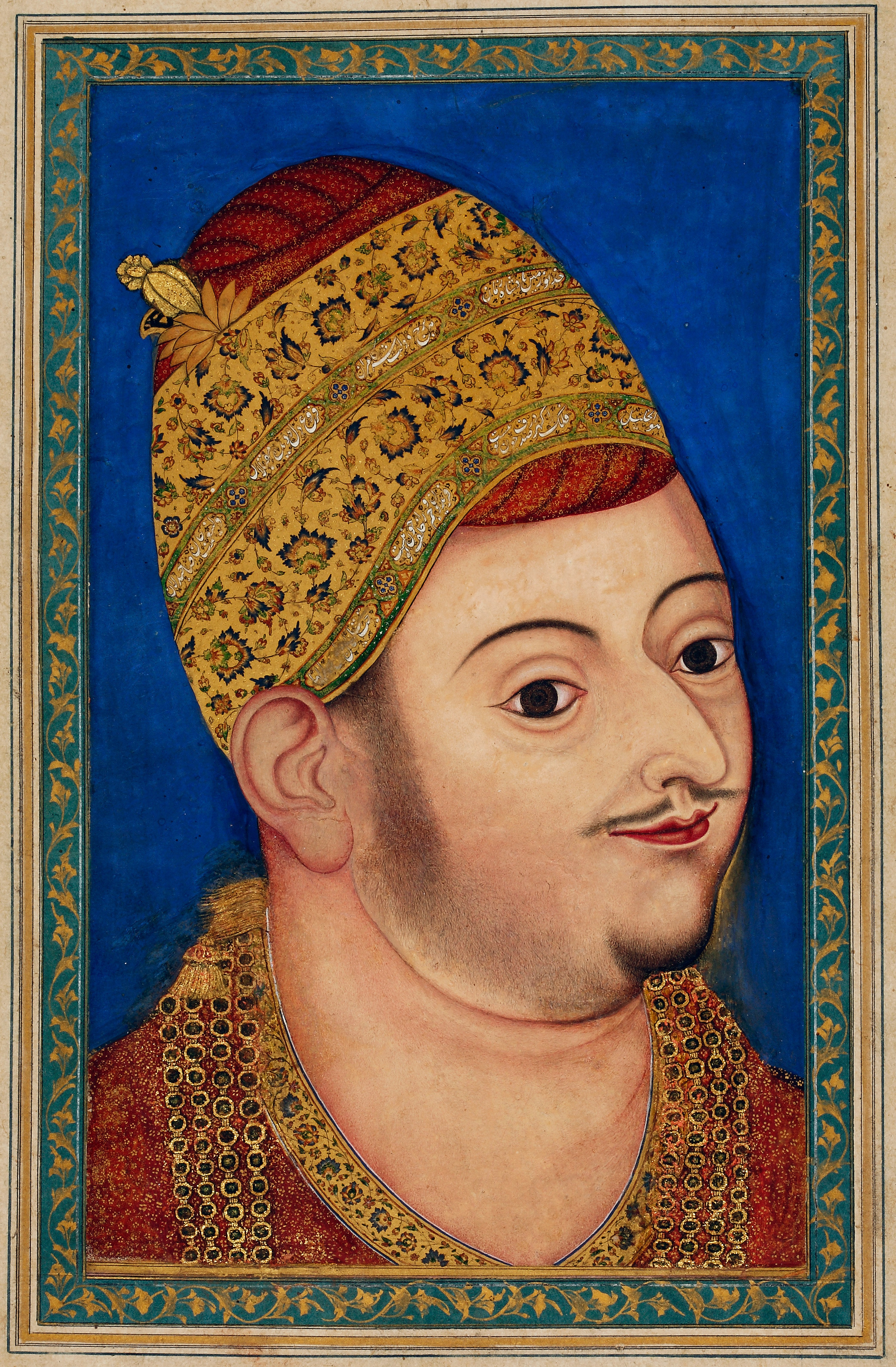
Deccan painting, Sultan Ibrahim Adil Shah II of Bijapur, c. 1590. A three-quarter view which gives a powerful and lively impression of the sitter, despite lacking both Mughal precision, and very coherent modelling of the surfaces.

Mughal portrait of Raja Jagat Singh of Nurpur (reigned 1618–1646), probably 1619

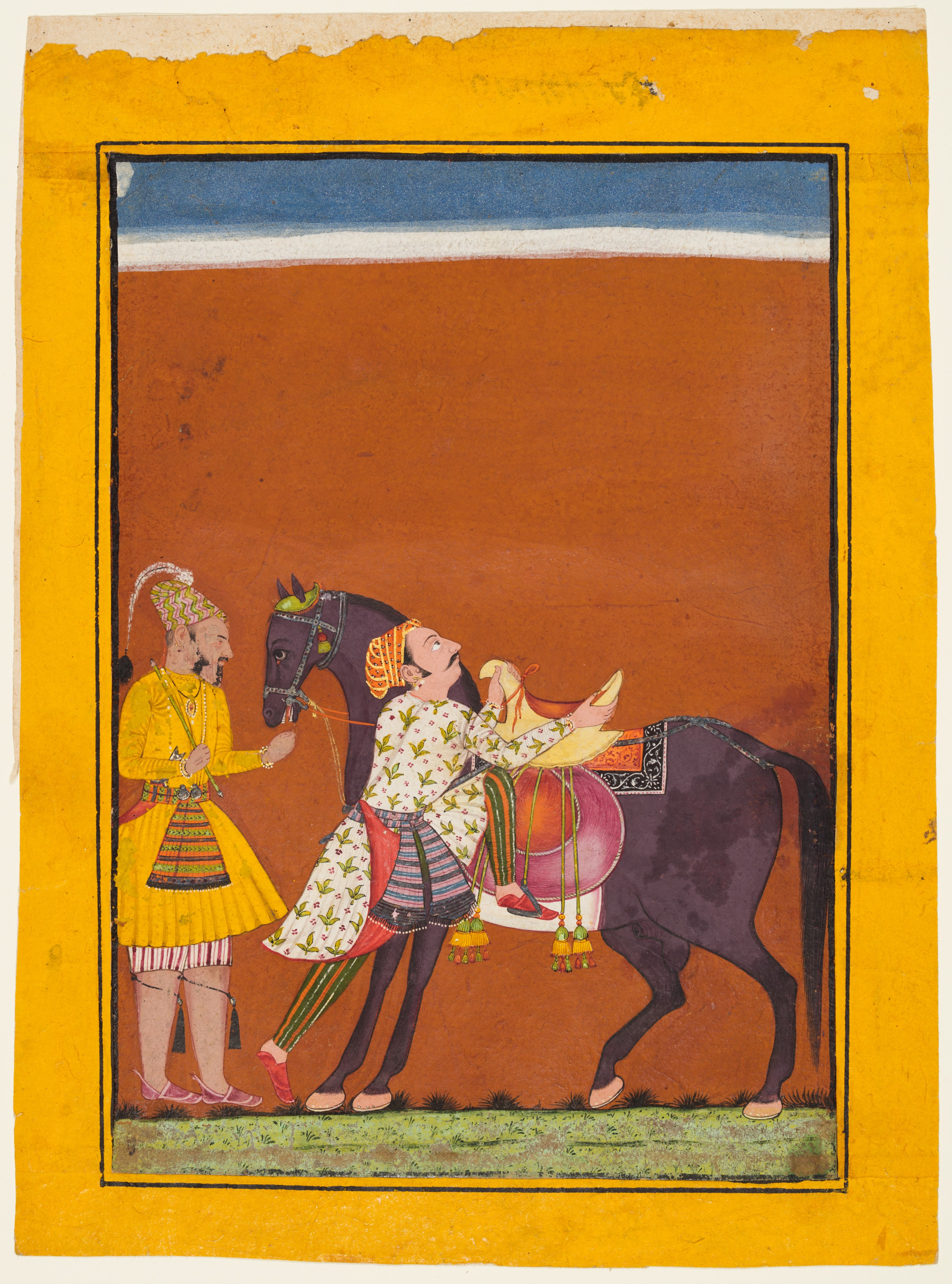
Pahari painting, Chamba, c. 1665, a warrior mounts his horse

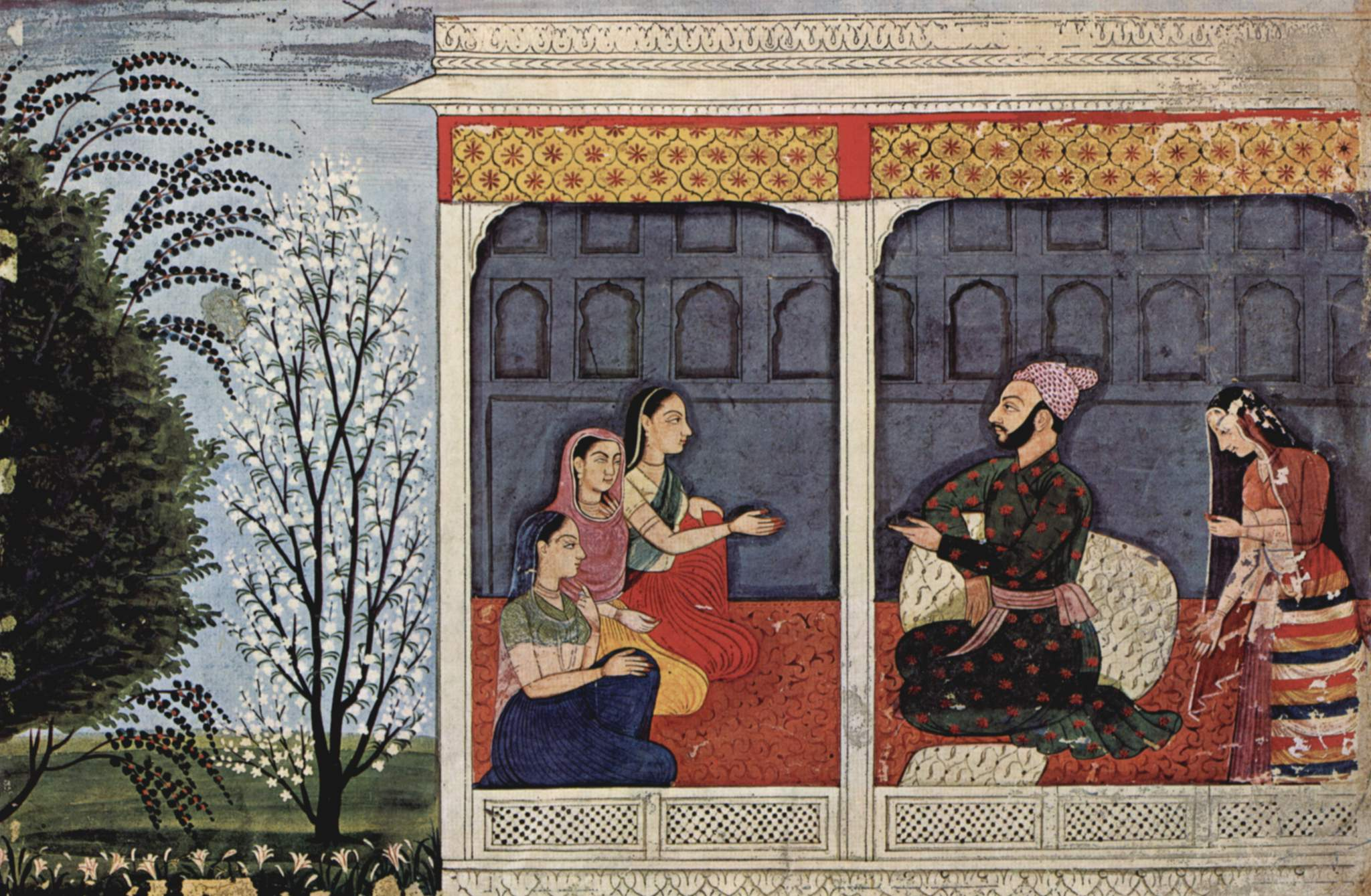
Portrait of the Govardhân Chand, Pahari painting style, c. 1750.

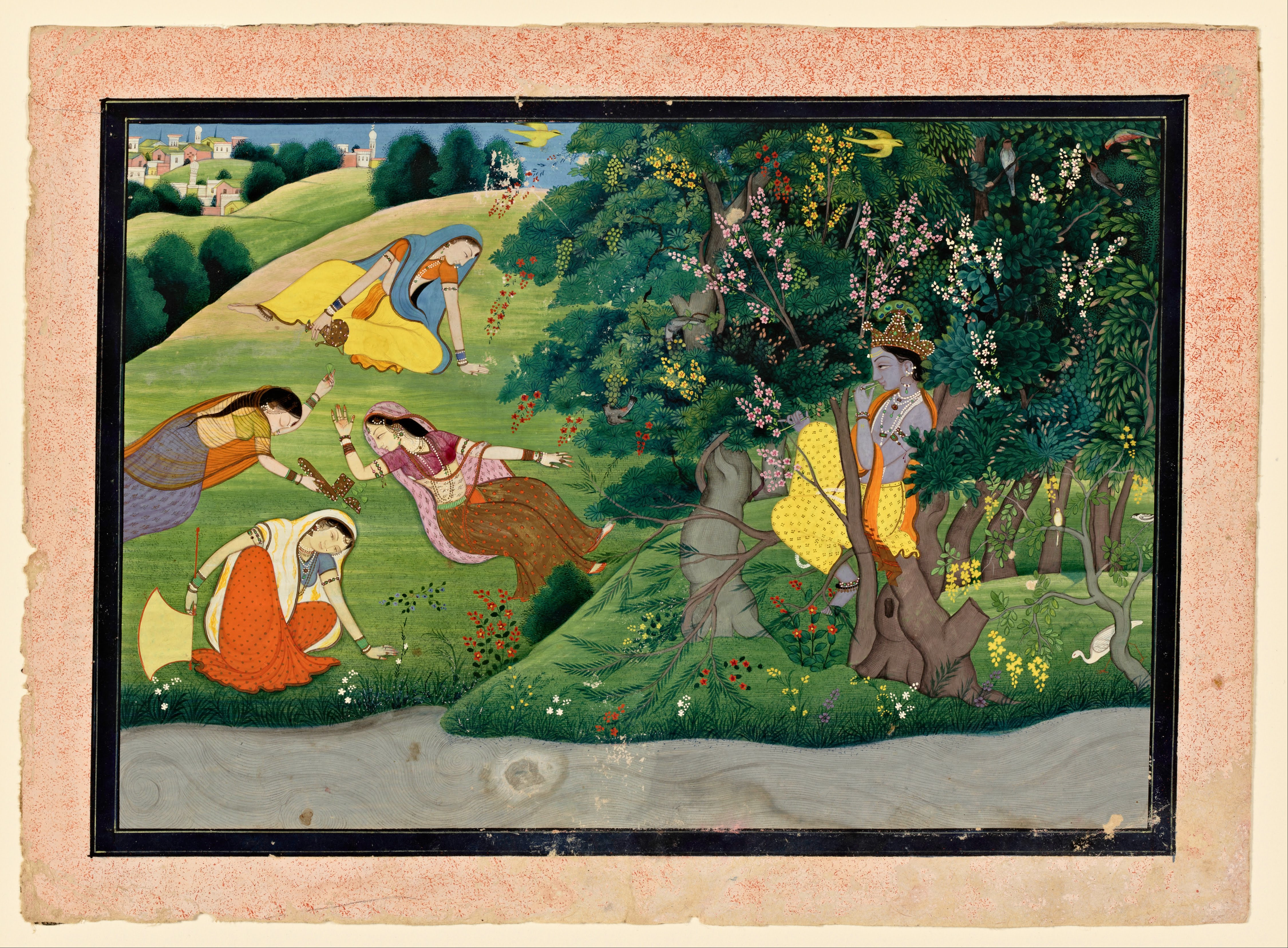
Kangra painting, c. 1775, Krishna plays his flute to the gopis

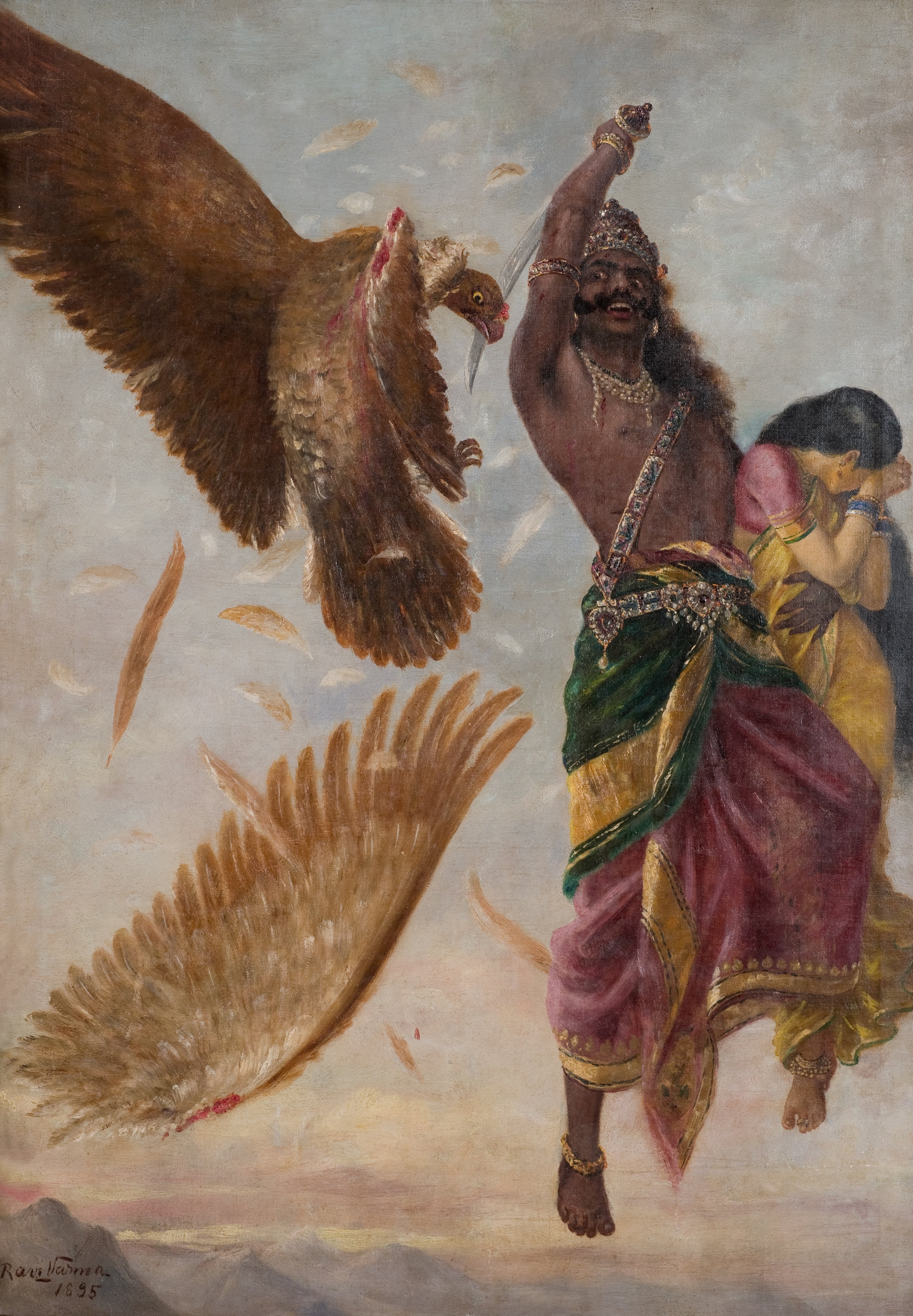
Ravana kills Jathayu; the captive Sita despairs, by Raja Ravi Varma

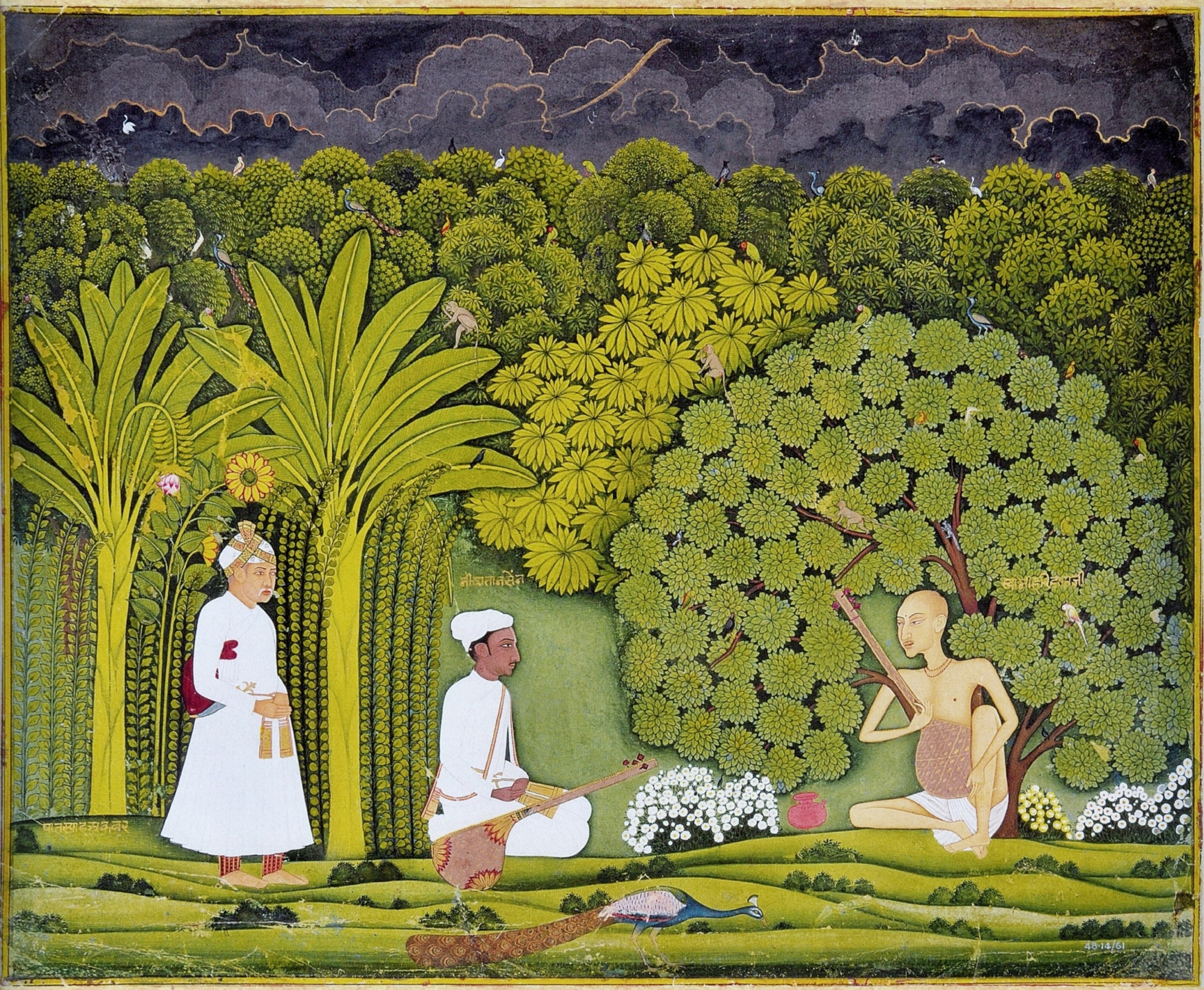
Akbar and Tansen Visit Haridas in Vrindavan, Rajasthan style, c. 1750.

Krishna Summoning the Cows, Pahari painting, Bilaspur, 18th century

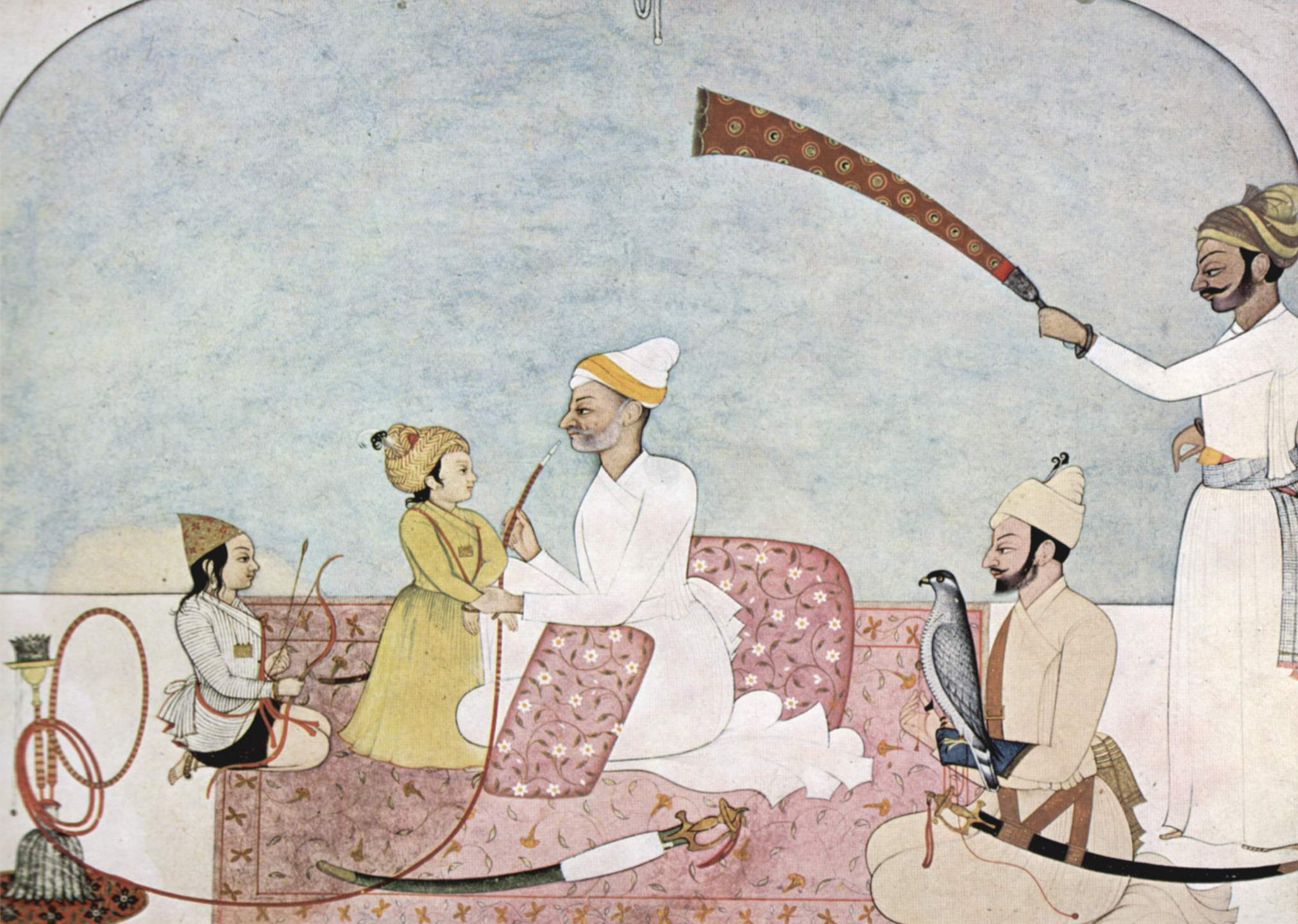
A man with children, Pahari painting style, 1760.

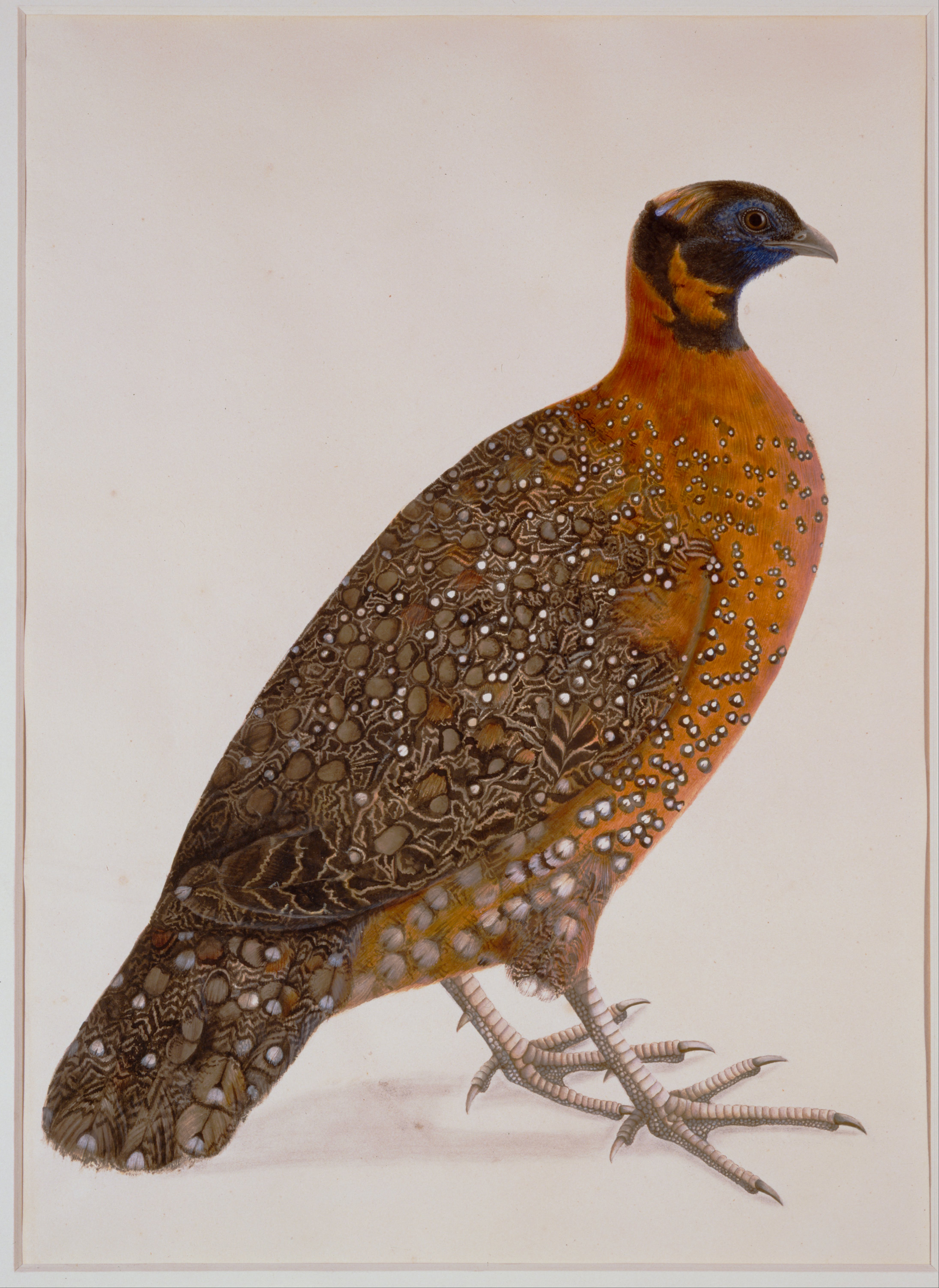
Company style, 1770s, Crimson Horned Pheasant (Satyr Tragapan)

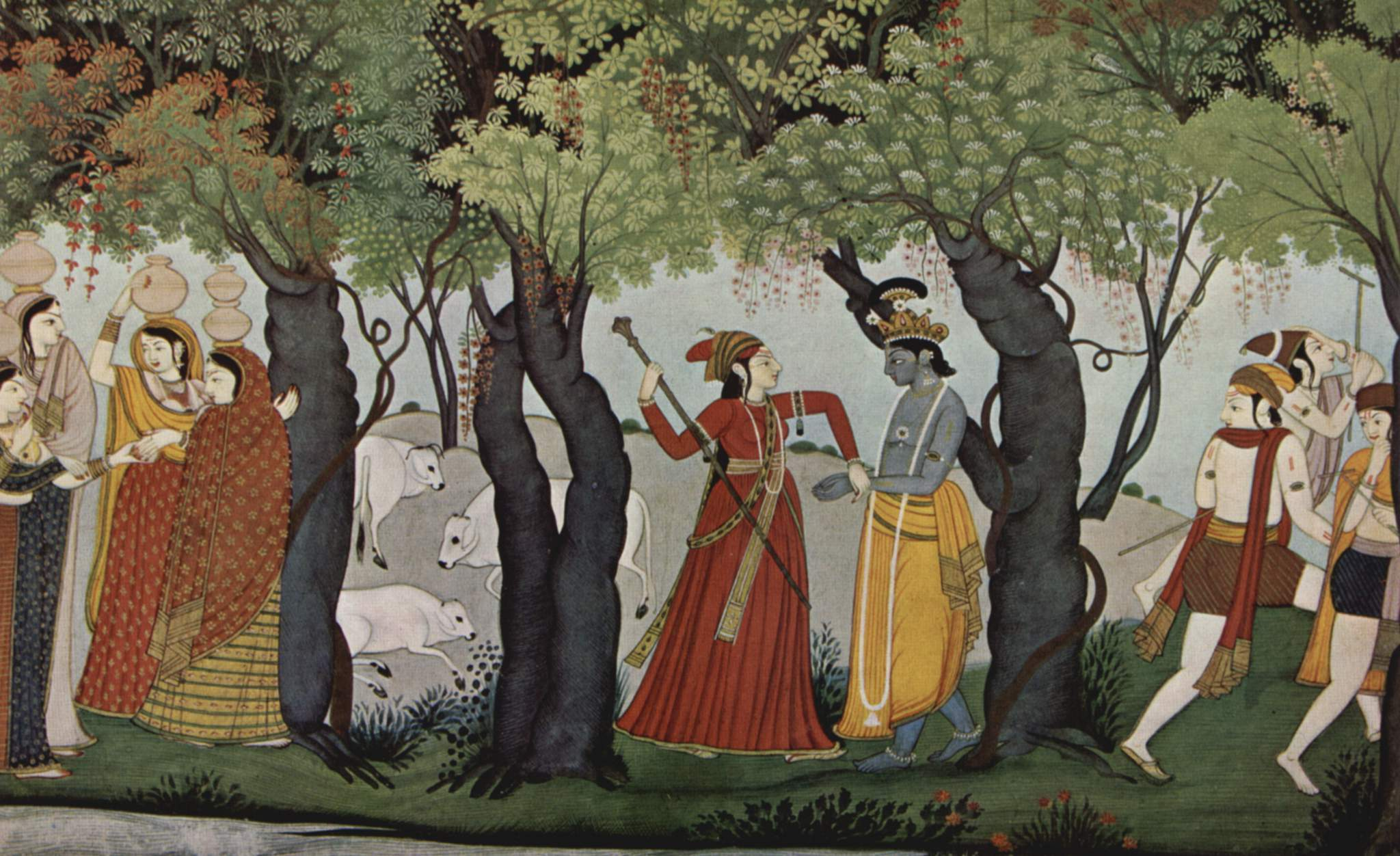
Râdhâ arrests Krishna, Pahari painting style, 1770.

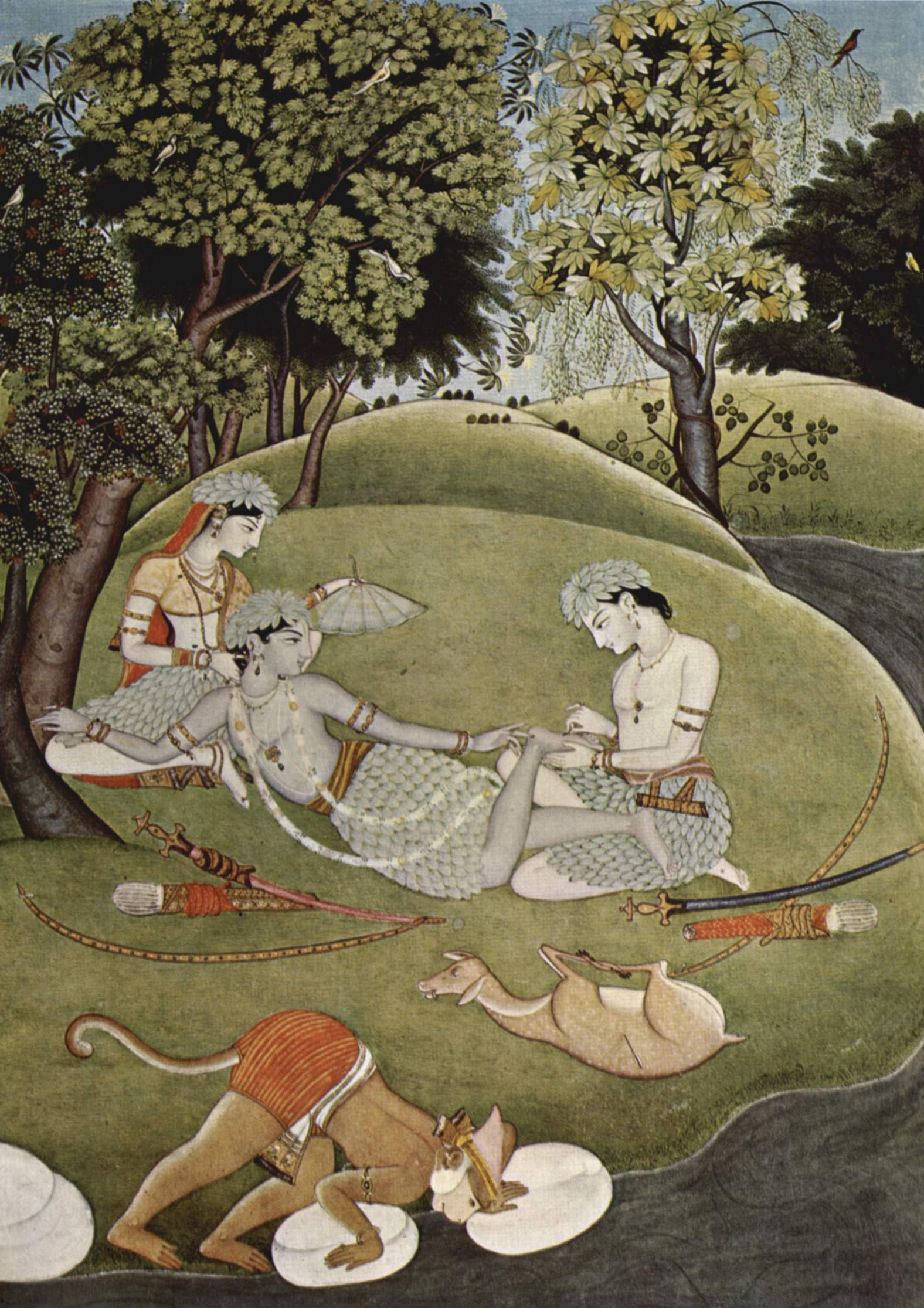
Rama and Sita in the Forest, Pahari painting style, 1780.

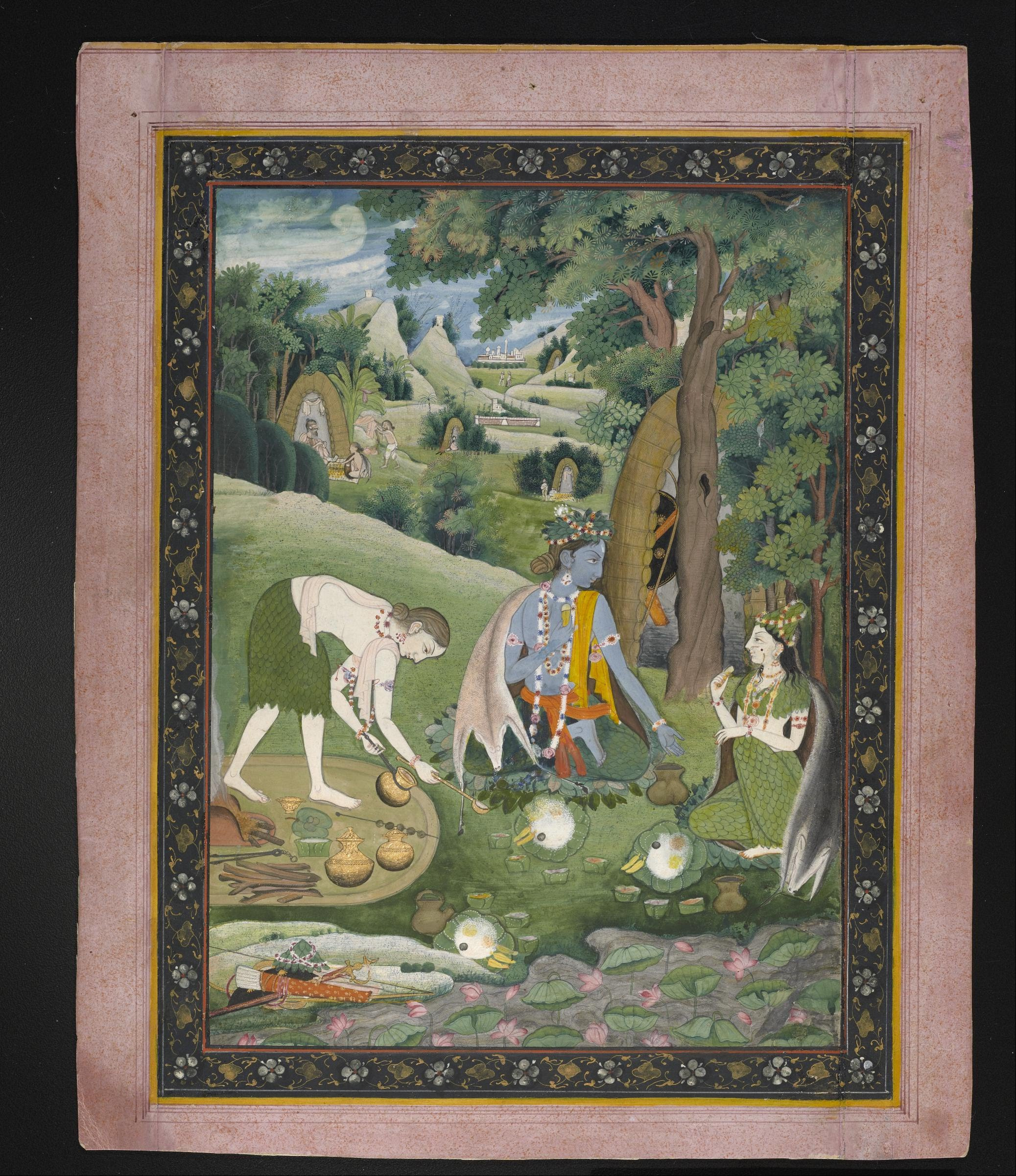
Late Kangra painting, 1815/1825, Rama, Lakshmana, and Sita

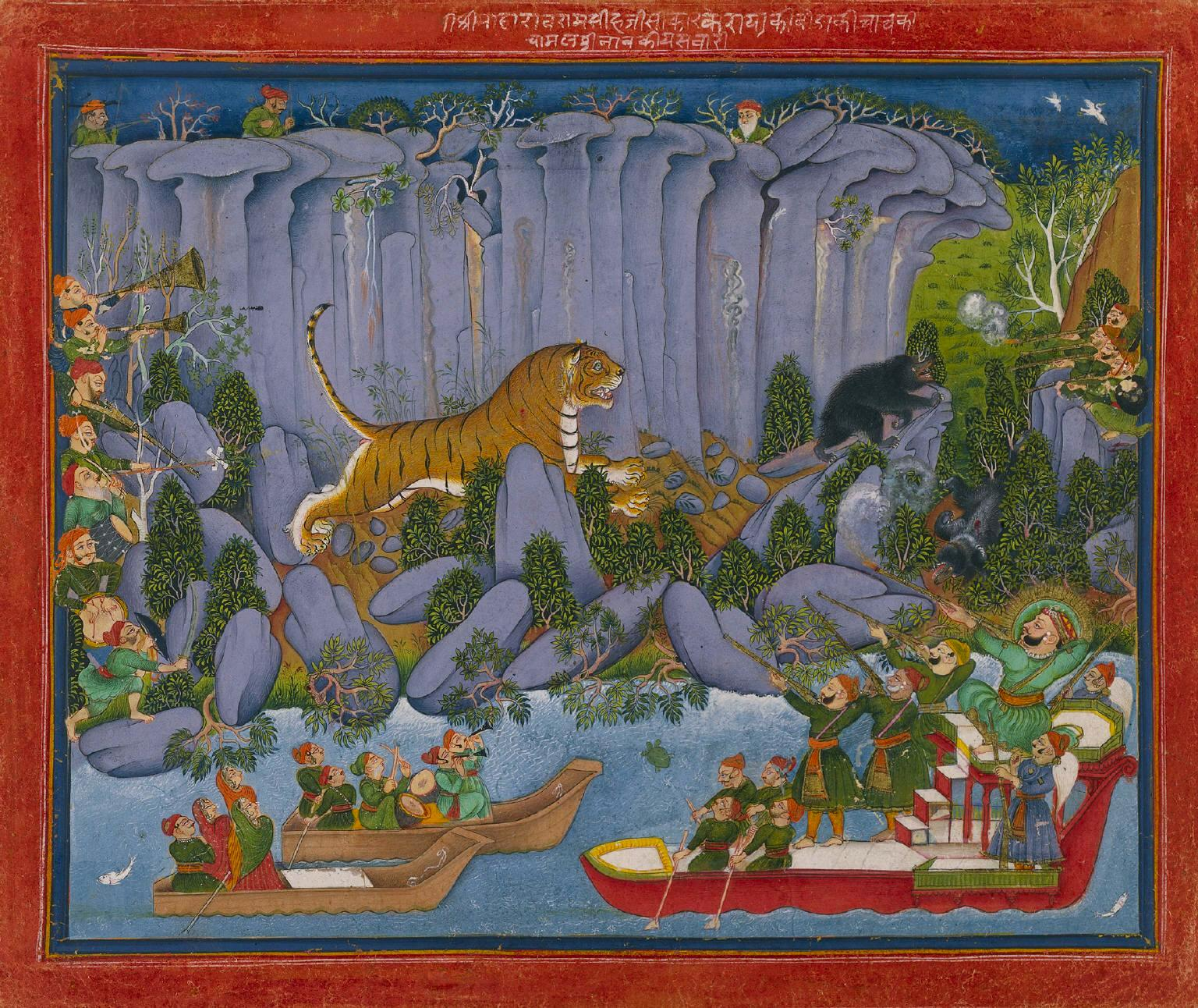
Late Rajput painting, Kota, c. 1830s, Ram Singh II Tiger Hunting

==== Indian ====
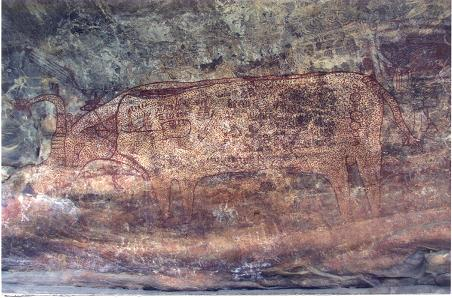
Rock Shelters of Bhimbetka, rock painting, Stone Age, India

Indian paintings historically revolved around the religious deities and kings. Indian art is a collective term for several different schools of art that existed in the Indian subcontinent. The paintings varied from large frescoes of Ajanta to the intricate Mughal miniature paintings to the metal embellished works from the Tanjore school. The paintings from the Gandhar–Taxila are influenced by the Persian works in the west. The eastern style of painting was mostly developed around the Nalanda school of art. The works are mostly inspired by various scenes from Indian mythology.

===== History =====
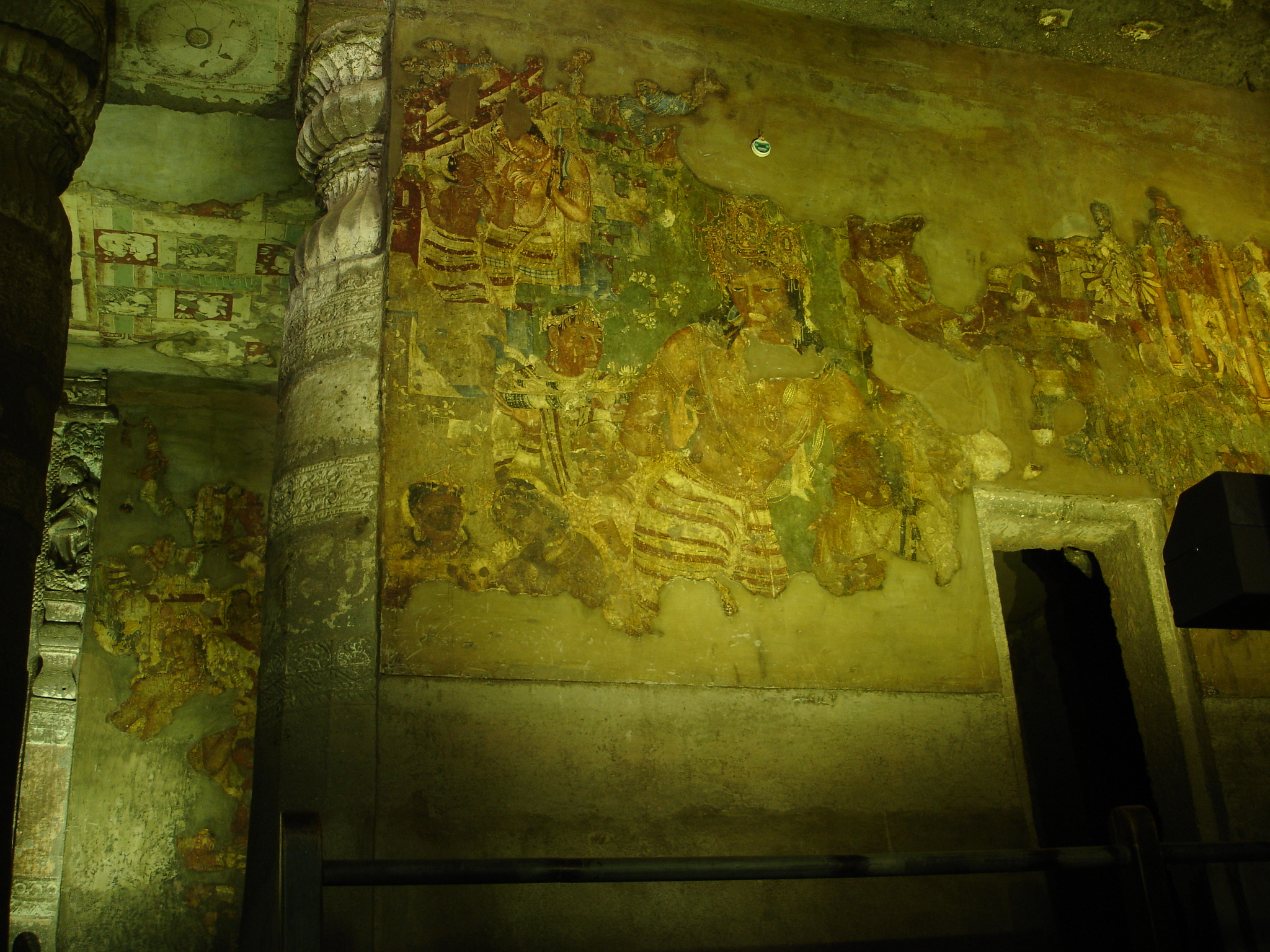
A fresco from Cave 1 of Ajanta.

The earliest Indian paintings were the rock paintings of prehistoric times, the petroglyphs as found in places like the Rock Shelters of Bhimbetka, and some of them are older than 5500 BC. Such works continued and after several millennia, in the 7th century, carved pillars of Ajanta, Maharashtra state present a fine example of Indian paintings, and the colors, mostly various shades of red and orange, were derived from minerals.

Ajanta Caves in Maharashtra, India are rock-cut cave monuments dating back to the 2nd century BCE and containing paintings and sculpture considered to be masterpieces of both Buddhist religious art and universal pictorial art.

Madhubani painting

Madhubani painting is a style of Indian painting, practiced in the Mithila region of Bihar state, India. The origins of Madhubani painting are shrouded in antiquity.

===== Mughal =====
Two Scribes Seated with Books and a Writing Table Fragment of a decorative margin Northern India (Mughal school), ca. 1640–1650

Mughal painting is a particular style of Indian painting, generally confined to illustrations on the book and done in miniatures, and which emerged, developed and took shape during the period of the Mughal Empire 16th −19th centuries.

===== Rajput =====
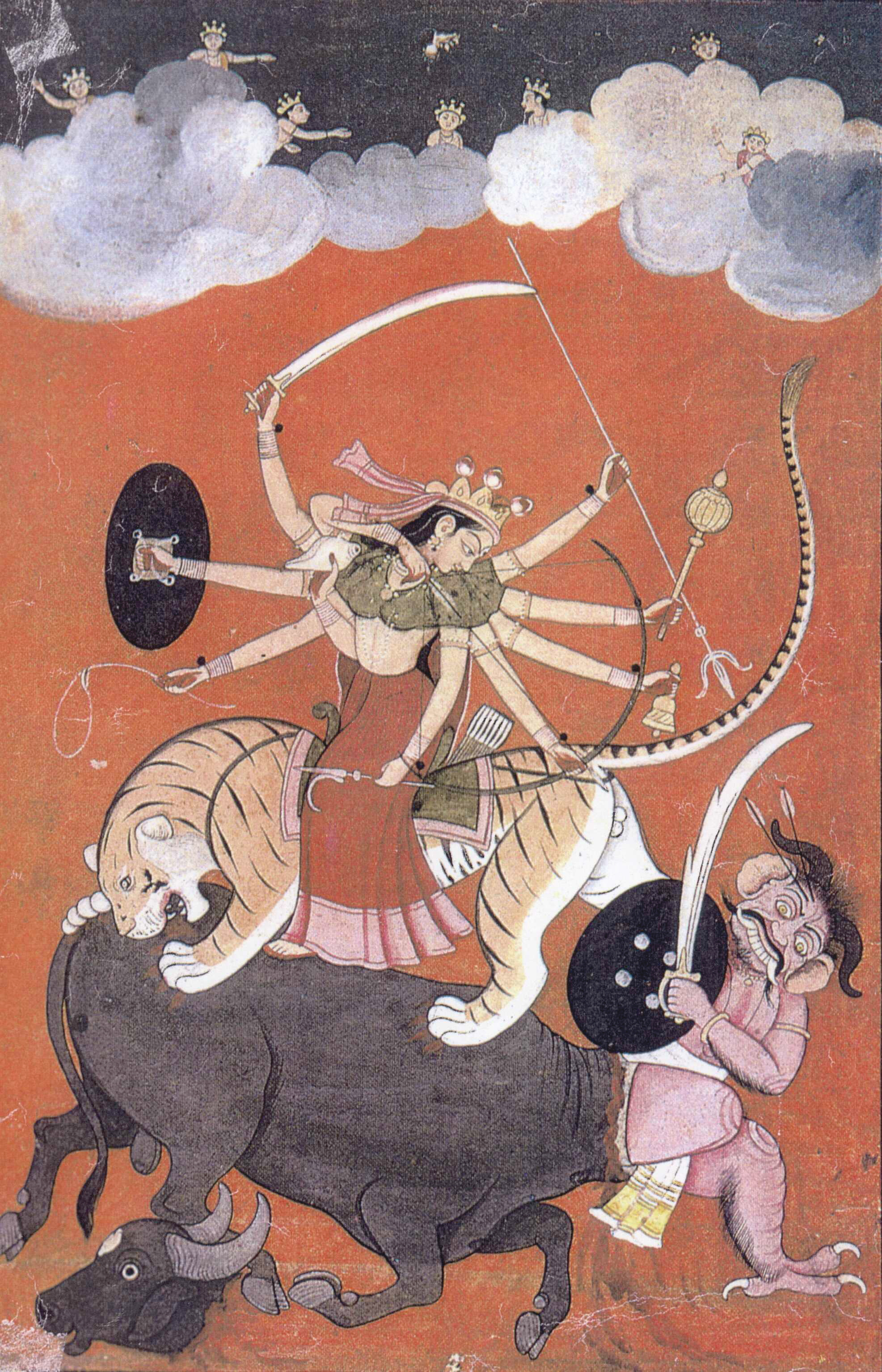
Mother Goddess A miniature painting of the Pahari style, dating to the eighteenth century. Pahari and Rajput miniatures share many common features.

Rajput painting evolved and flourished during the 18th century, in the royal courts of Rajputana, India. Each Rajput kingdom evolved a distinct style, but with certain common features. Rajput paintings depict a number of themes, events of epics like the Ramayana and the Mahabharata, Krishna's life, beautiful landscapes, and humans. Miniatures were the preferred medium of Rajput painting, but several manuscripts also contain Rajput paintings, and paintings were even done on the walls of palaces, inner chambers of the forts, havelies, particularly, the havelis of Shekhawait.

The colors extracted from certain minerals, plant sources, conch shells, and were even derived by processing precious stones, gold and silver were used. The preparation of desired colors was a lengthy process, sometimes taking weeks. Brushes used were very fine.

===== Tanjore =====
Tanjore painting is an important form of classical South Indian painting native to the town of Tanjore in Tamil Nadu. The art form dates back to the early 9th century, a period dominated by the Chola rulers, who encouraged art and literature. These paintings are known for their elegance, rich colors, and attention to detail. The themes for most of these paintings are Hindu Gods and Goddesses and scenes from Hindu mythology. In modern times, these paintings have become a much sought after souvenir during festive occasions in South India.

The process of making a Tanjore painting involves many stages. The first stage involves the making of the preliminary sketch of the image on the base. The base consists of a cloth pasted over a wooden base. Then chalk powder or zinc oxide is mixed with water-soluble adhesive and applied on the base. To make the base smoother, a mild abrasive is sometimes used. After the drawing is made, decoration of the jewellery and the apparels in the image is done with semi-precious stones. Laces or threads are also used to decorate the jewellery. On top of this, the gold foils are pasted. Finally, dyes are used to add colors to the figures in the paintings.

===== Madras School =====
During British rule in India, the crown found that Madras had some of the most talented and intellectual artistic minds in the world. As the British had also established a huge settlement in and around Madras, Georgetown was chosen to establish an institute that would cater to the artistic expectations of the royal family in London. This has come to be known as the Madras School of Art. At first traditional artists were employed to produce exquisite varieties of furniture, metal work, and curios and their work was sent to the royal palaces of the Queen.

Unlike the Bengal School where 'copying' is the norm of teaching, the Madras School flourishes on 'creating' new styles, arguments and trends.

===== Bengal School =====
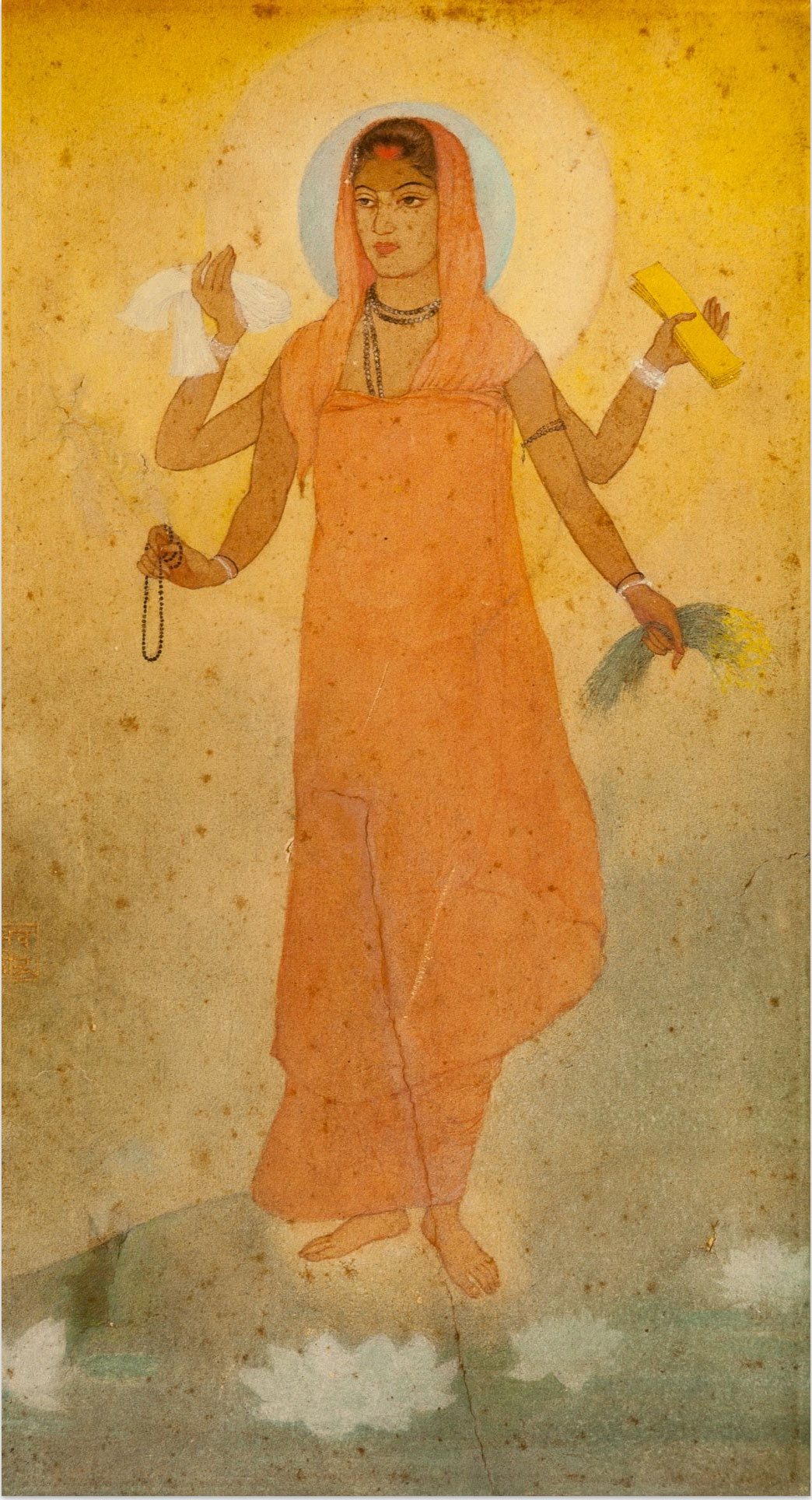
Bharat Mata by Abanindranath Tagore (1871–1951), a nephew of the poet Rabindranath Tagore, and a pioneer of the movement

The Bengal school of art was an influential style of art that flourished in India during the British Raj in the early 20th century. It was associated with Indian nationalism, but was also promoted and supported by many British arts administrators.

The Bengal School arose as an avant garde and nationalist movement reacting against the academic art styles previously promoted in India, both by Indian artists such as Raja Ravi Varma and in British art schools. Following the widespread influence of Indian spiritual ideas in the West, the British art teacher Ernest Binfield Havel attempted to reform the teaching methods at the Calcutta School of Art by encouraging students to imitate Mughal miniatures. This caused immense controversy, leading to a strike by students and complaints from the local press, including from nationalists who considered it to be a retrogressive move. Havel was supported by the artist Abanindranath Tagore, a nephew of the poet Rabindranath Tagore. Tagore painted a number of works influenced by Mughal art, a style that he and Havel believed to be expressive of India's distinct spiritual qualities, as opposed to the "materialism" of the West. Tagore's best-known painting, Bharat Mata (Mother India), depicted a young woman, portrayed with four arms in the manner of Hindu deities, holding objects symbolic of India's national aspirations. Tagore later attempted to develop links with Japanese artists as part of an aspiration to construct a pan-Asianist model of art.

The Bengal School's influence in India declined with the spread of modernist ideas in the 1920s. In the post-independence period, Indian artists showed more adaptability as they borrowed freely from European styles and amalgamated them freely with the Indian motifs to new forms of art. While artists like Francis Newton Souza and Tyeb Mehta were more western in their approach, there were others like Ganesh Pyne and Maqbool Fida Husain who developed thoroughly indigenous styles of work. Today after the process of liberalization of market in India, the artists are experiencing more exposure to the international art-scene which is helping them in emerging with newer forms of art which were hitherto not seen in India. Jitish Kallat had shot to fame in the late 1990s with his paintings which were both modern and beyond the scope of generic definition. However, while artists in India in the new century are trying out new styles, themes and metaphors, it would not have been possible to get such quick recognition without the aid of the business houses which are now entering the art field like they had never before.

===== Modern Indian =====
Amrita Sher-Gil was an Indian painter, sometimes known as India's Frida Kahlo, and today considered an important woman painter of 20th-century India, whose legacy stands at par with that of the Masters of Bengal Renaissance; she is also the 'most expensive' woman painter of India.

Today, she is amongst Nine Masters, whose work was declared as art treasures by The Archaeological Survey of India, in 1976 and 1979, and over 100 of her paintings are now displayed at National Gallery of Modern Art, New Delhi.

During the colonial era, Western influences started to make an impact on Indian art. Some artists developed a style that used Western ideas of composition, perspective and realism to illustrate Indian themes. Others, like Jamini Roy, consciously drew inspiration from folk art.

By the time of Independence in 1947, several schools of art in India provided access to modern techniques and ideas. Galleries were established to showcase these artists. Modern Indian art typically shows the influence of Western styles, but is often inspired by Indian themes and images. Major artists are beginning to gain international recognition, initially among the Indian diaspora, but also among non-Indian audiences.

The Progressive Artists' Group, established shortly after India became independent in 1947, was intended to establish new ways of expressing India in the post-colonial era. The founders were six eminent artists – K. H. Ara, S. K. Bakre, H. A. Gade, M.F. Husain, S.H. Raza and F. N. Souza, though the group was dissolved in 1956, it was profoundly influential in changing the idiom of Indian art. Almost all India's major artists in the 1950s were associated with the group. Some of those who are well-known today are Bal Chabda, Manishi Dey, Mukul Dey, V. S. Gaitonde, Ram Kumar, Tyeb Mehta, and Akbar Padamsee. Other famous painters like Jahar Dasgupta, Prokash Karmakar, John Wilkins, Narayanan Ramachandran, and Bijon Choudhuri enriched the art culture of India. They have become the icons of modern Indian art. Art historians like Prof. Rai Anand Krishna have also referred to those works of modern artistes that reflect Indian ethos. Geeta Vadhera has had acclaim in translating complex, Indian spiritual themes onto canvas like Sufi thought, the Upanishads and the Bhagwad Geeta.

Indian art got a boost with the economic liberalization of the country since the early 1990s. Artists from various fields now started bringing in varied styles of work. In post-liberalization India, many artists have established themselves in the international art market like the abstract painter Natvar Bhavsar, figurative artist Devajyoti Ray and sculptor Anish Kapoor whose mammoth postminimalist artworks have acquired attention for their sheer size. Many art houses and galleries have also opened in USA and Europe to showcase Indian artworks.

=== South-East Asia ===
==== Indonesian ====
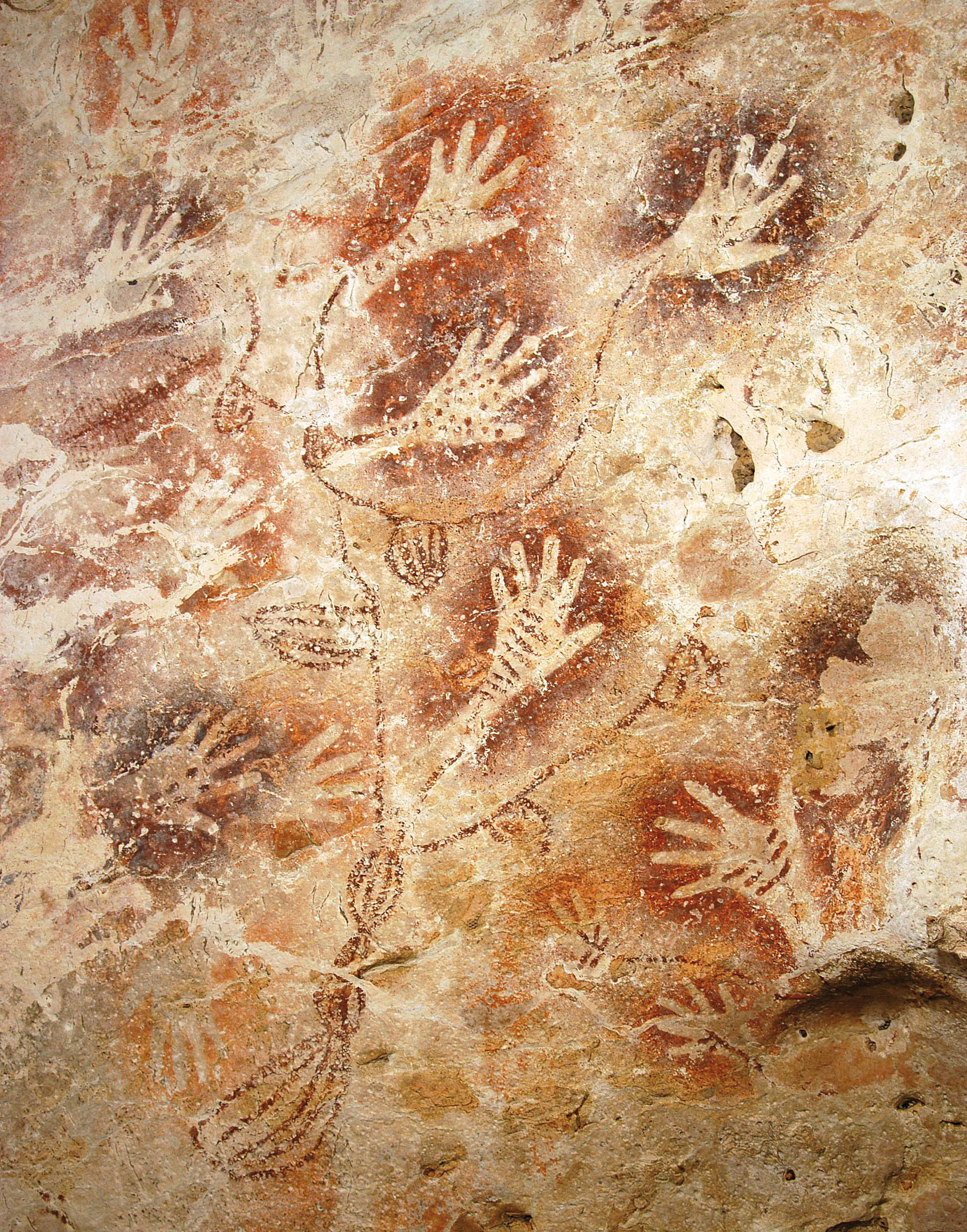
Hand stencils in the "Tree of Life" cave painting in Gua Tewet, Kalimantan, Indonesia

The oldest known cave paintings are more than 44,000–50,000 years old, found in the caves in the district of Maros (Sulawesi, Indonesia). The oldest type of cave paintings are hand stencils and simple geometric shapes; the oldest undisputed examples of figurative cave paintings are somewhat younger, close to 35,000 years old.

The discovery of the then-oldest known figurative art painting, over 40,000 (perhaps as old as 52,000) years old, of an unknown animal, in the cave of Lubang Jeriji Saléh. In December 2019, however, figurative cave paintings depicting pig hunting in the Maros-Pangkep karst in Sulawesi were estimated to be even older, at least 43,900 years old. The finding was noted to be "the oldest pictorial record of storytelling and the earliest figurative artwork in the world".

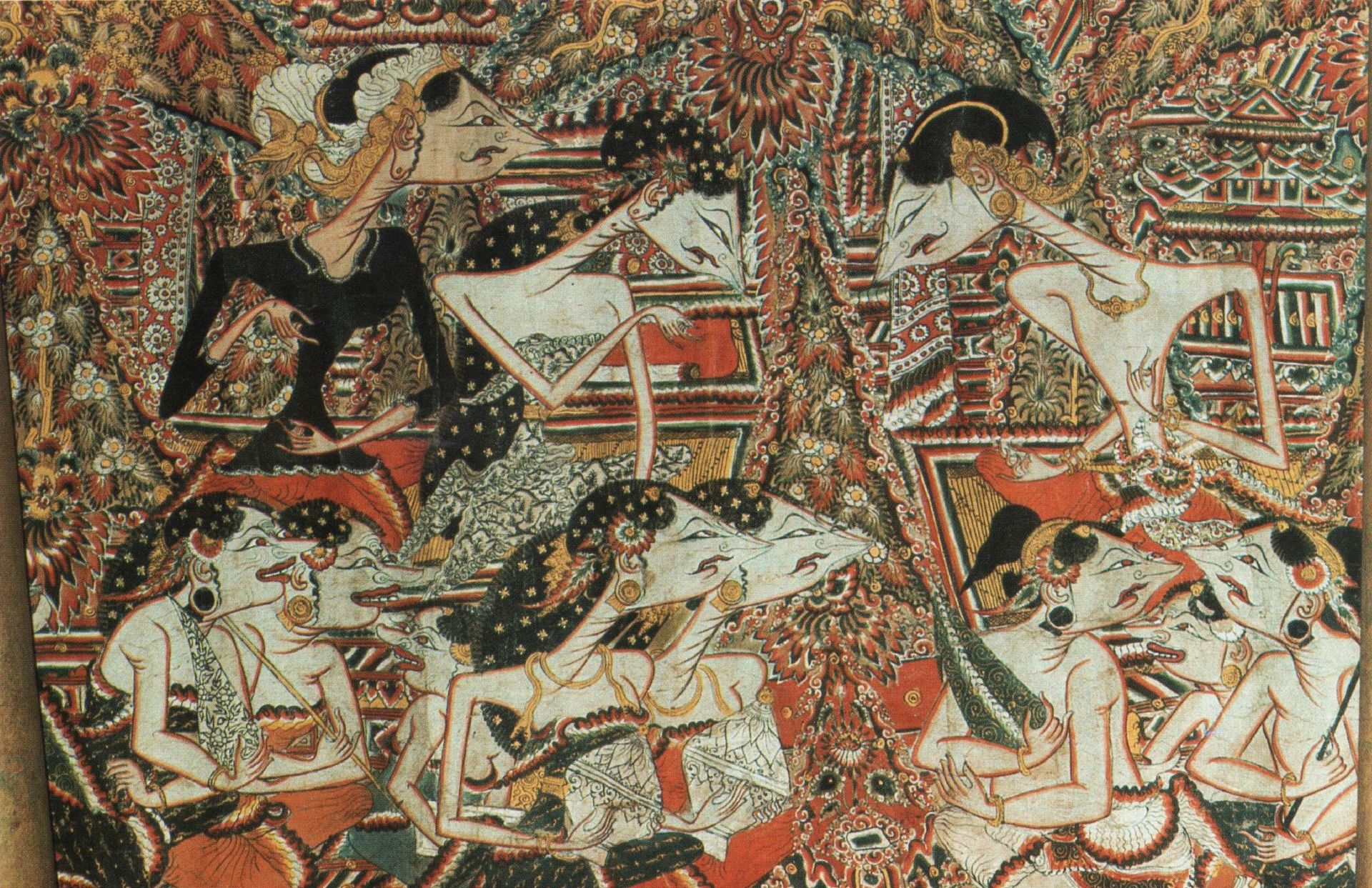
Wayang beber, 17th century

Other examples of Indonesian paintings are the Kenyah decorative art, based on endemic natural motifs such as ferns and hornbills, found decorating the walls of Kenyah longhouses. Other notable traditional art is the geometric Toraja wood carvings. Balinese paintings are initially the narrative images to depict scenes of Balinese legends and religious scripts. The classical Balinese paintings are often decorating the lontar manuscripts and also the ceilings of temples pavilion. Notable modern Indonesian painters in the European tradition include Raden Saleh, Jan Toorop, Basuki Abdullah and Abdullah Suriosubroto, their themes explore landscape and portrait painting.

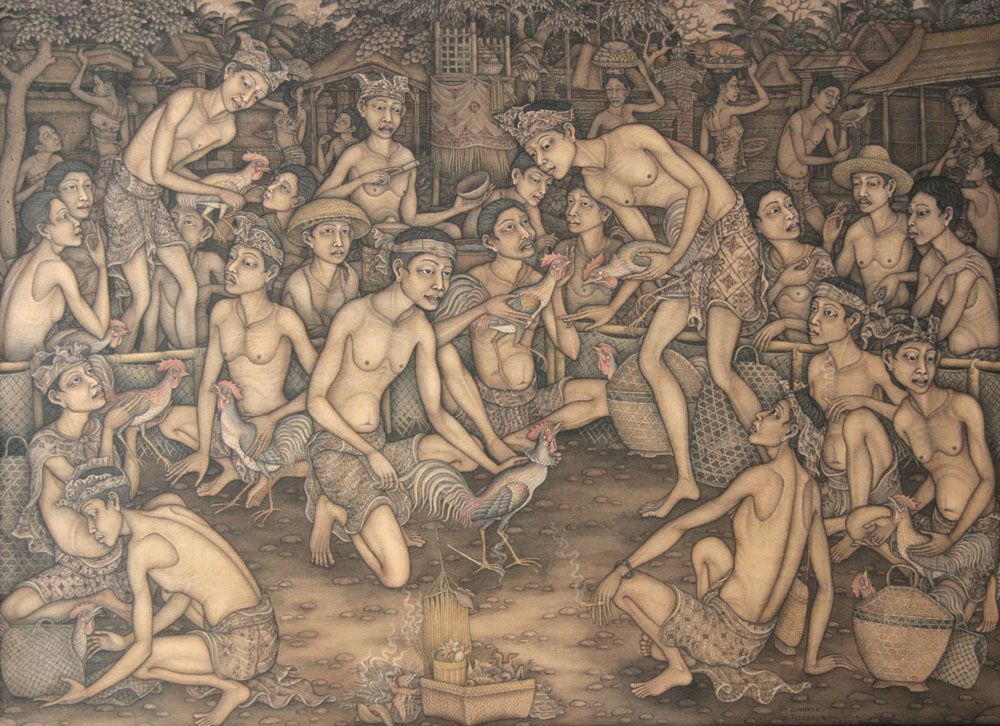
Traditional Balinese painting depicting cockfighting.

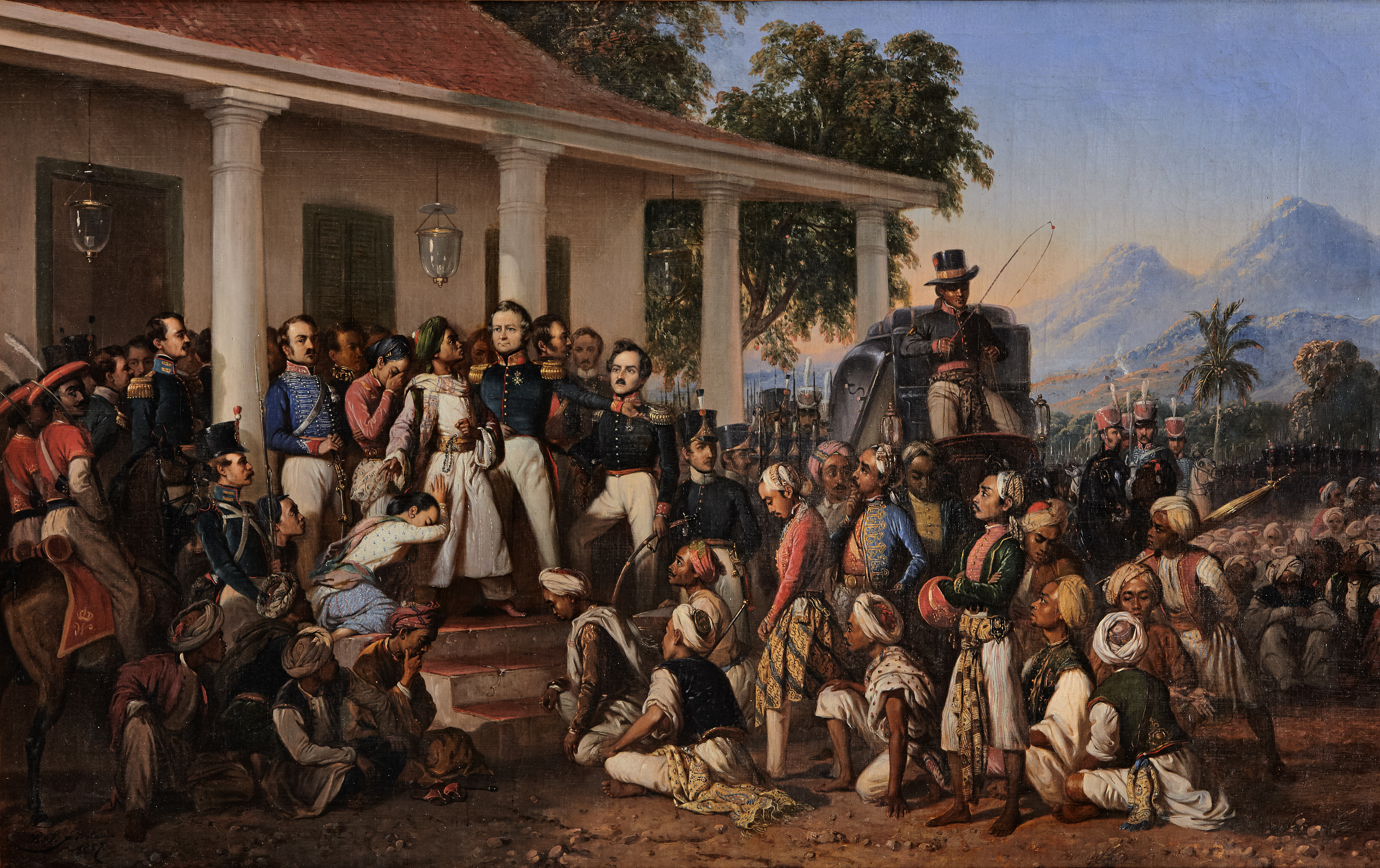
Capture of Prince Diponegoro, 1857.

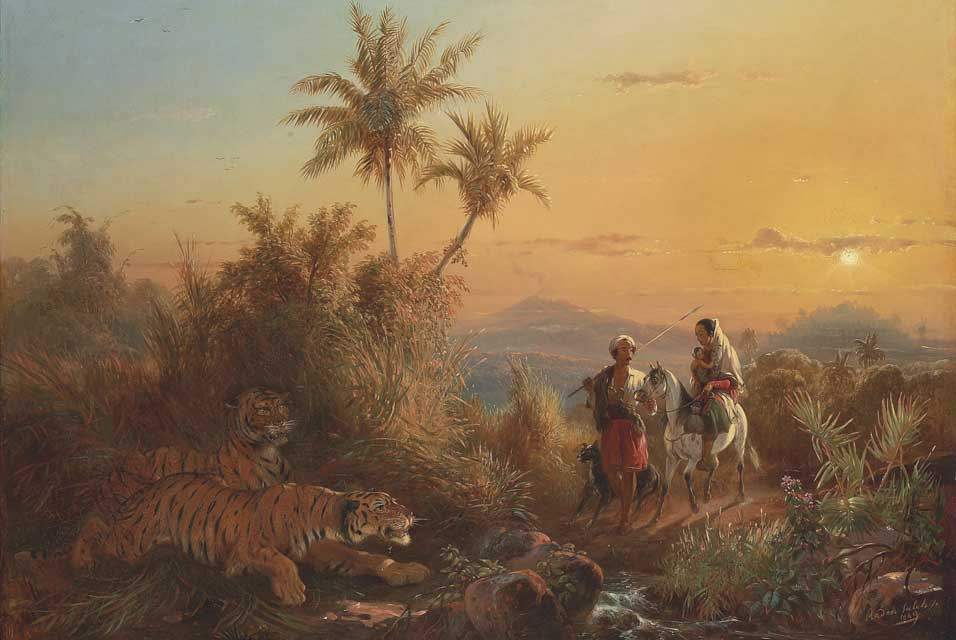
Javanese Landscape, with Tigers Listening to the Sound of a Travelling Group, 1849.

The Wheel of Life, I Ketut Murtika (b. 1952), Gouache on canvas

Pre-1920 Kamasan Palindon Painting detail, an example of Kamasan-style classical painting.

Mask Dancer (by A.A. Gde Anom Sukawati) in Puri Lukisan Museum.

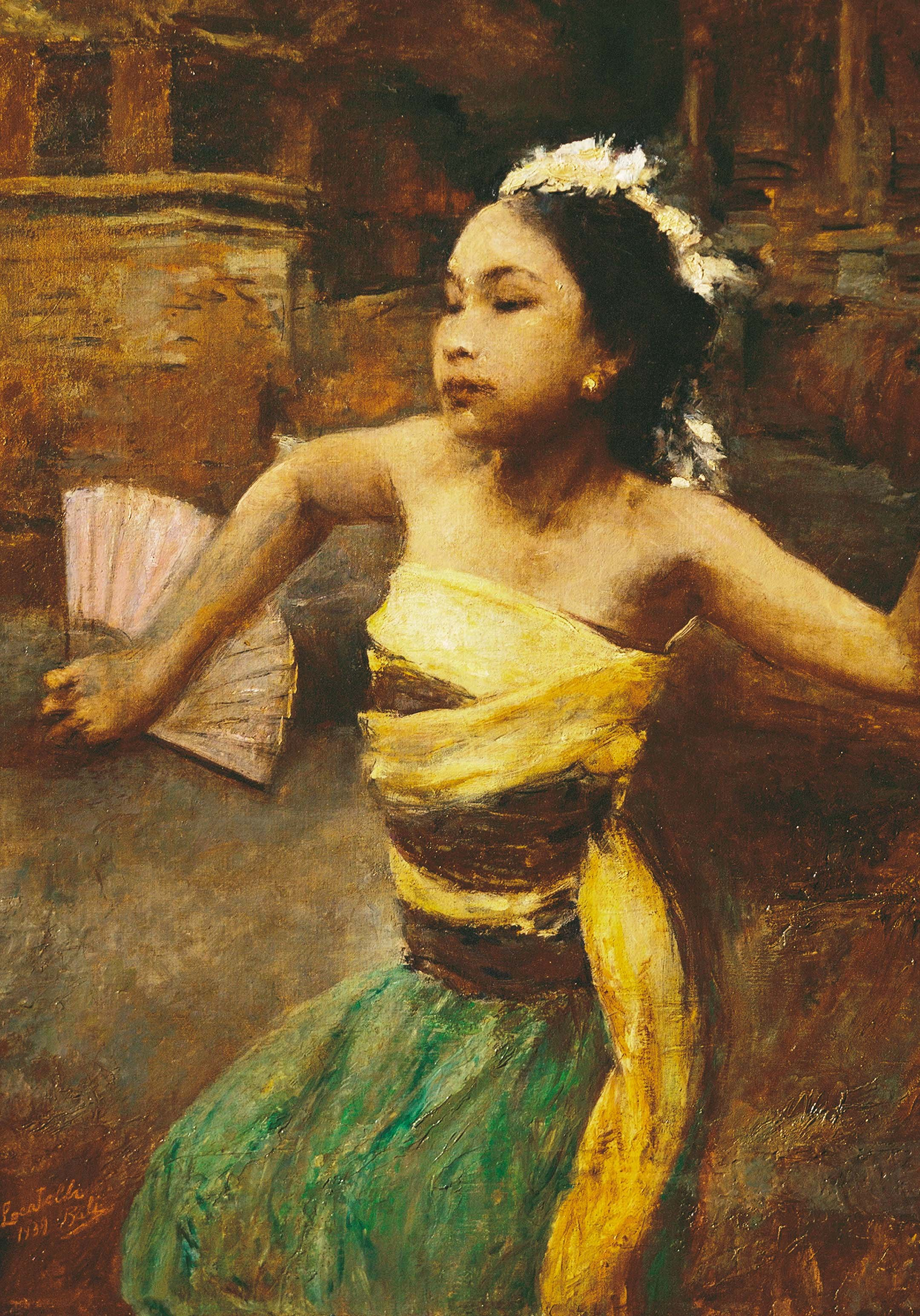
Legong dancer.

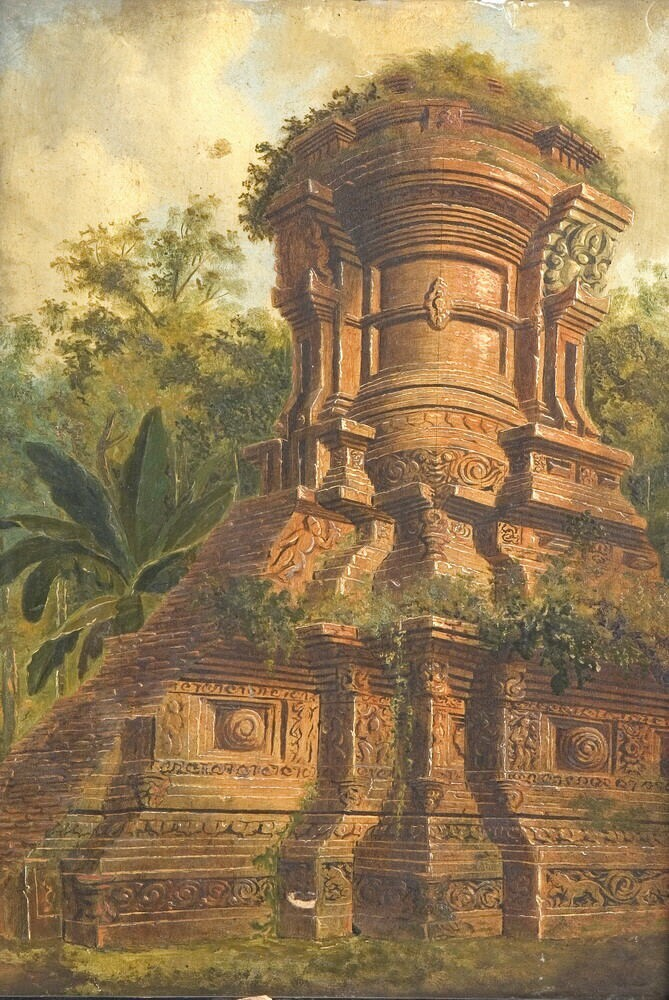
Indonesian Temple painting.

==== Filipino ====
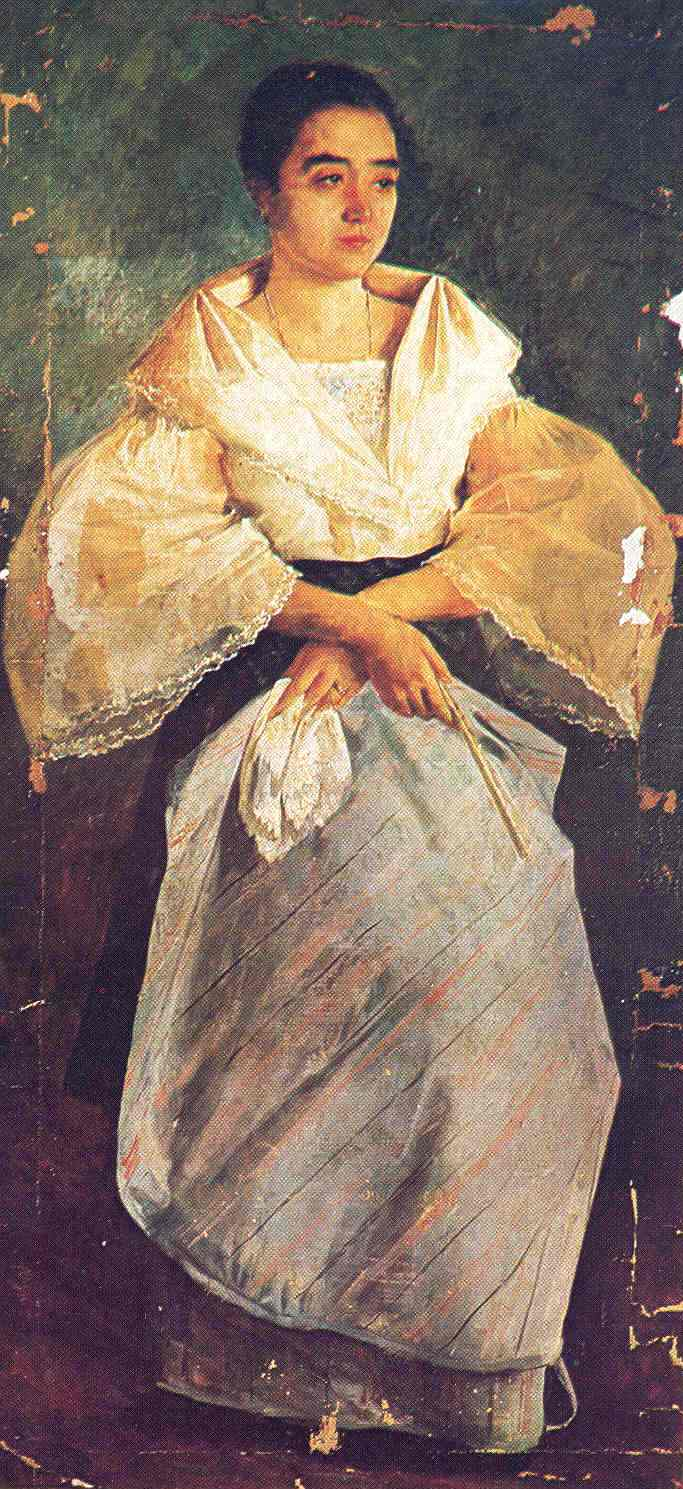
Juan Luna, La Bulaqueña, 1895

Filipino painting as a whole can be seen as an amalgamation of many cultural influences, though it tends to be more Western in its current form with Eastern roots.

Early Filipino painting can be found in red slip (clay mixed with water) designs embellished on the ritual pottery of the Philippines such as the Manunggul Jar. Evidence of Philippine pottery-making dated as early as 6000 BC has been found in Sanga-sanga Cave, Sulu and Laurente Cave, Cagayan. By 5000 BC the making of pottery was practiced throughout the country. Further evidences of painting are manifested in the tattoo tradition of early Filipinos, in particular the Visayans, whom Spanish explorers referred to as Pintados or the 'Painted People'. They decorated their bodies in various colored pigmentations with designs referencing flora and fauna and heavenly bodies. Some of the most elaborate painting done by early Filipinos that survives to the present day is manifested among the arts and architecture of the Maranao who are well known for the Nāga Dragons and the Sarimanok carved and painted in the beautiful Panolong of their Torogan or King's House.

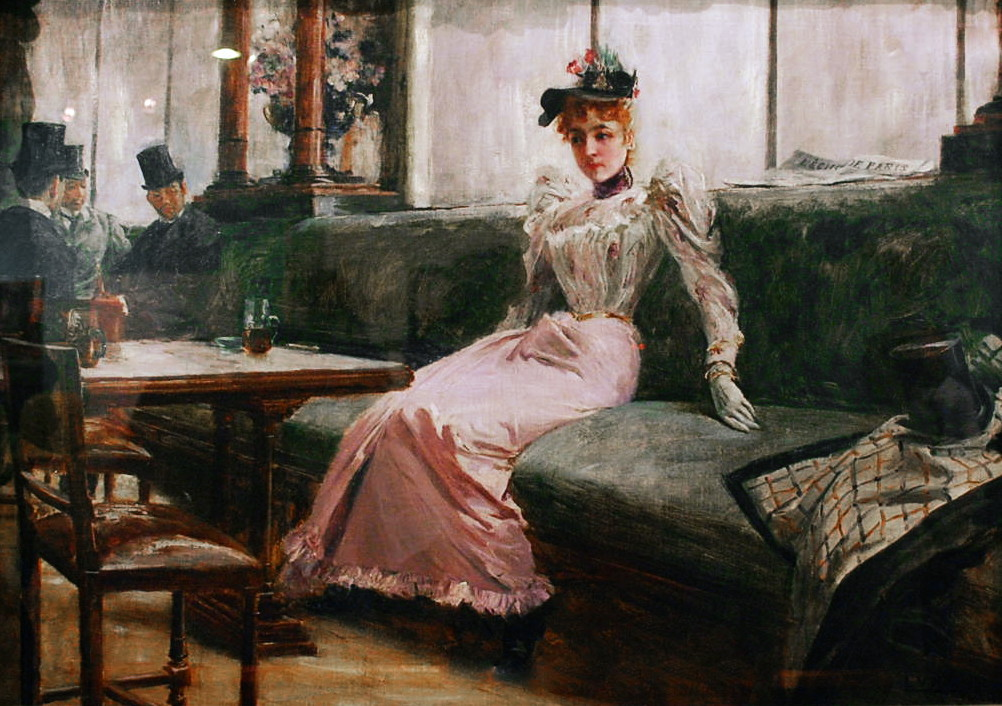
Juan Luna, The Parisian Life, 1892

Filipinos began creating paintings in the European tradition during the 17th-century Spanish period. The earliest of these paintings were Church frescoes and religious imagery from Biblical sources as well as engravings, sculptures and lithographs featuring Christian icons and European nobility. Most of the paintings and sculptures between the 19th and 20th century were a mixture of religious, political, and landscape artwork, with qualities of sweetness, dark, and light. Early modernist painters such as Damián Domingo were associated with religious and secular paintings. The art of Juan Luna and Félix Hidalgo showed a trend toward political statement. Artists such as Fernando Amorsolo used post-modernism to produce paintings that illustrated Philippine culture, nature, and harmony. Other artists such as Fernando Zóbel used reality and abstraction in their work.

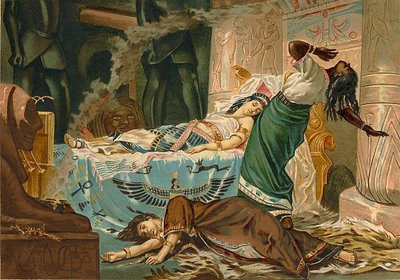
Juan Luna, The Death of Cleopatra, 1881

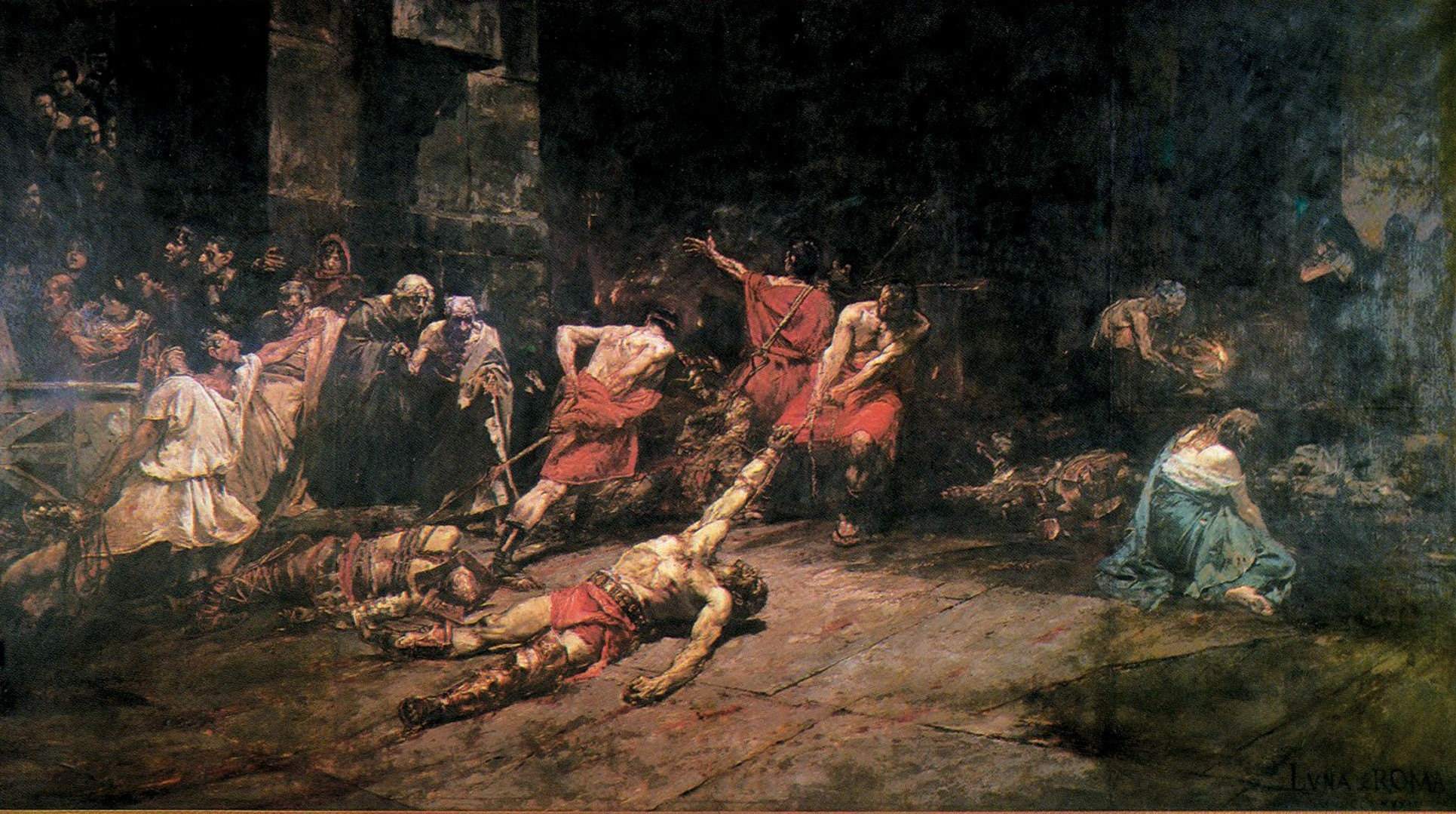
Juan Luna, Spoliarium, c. 1884

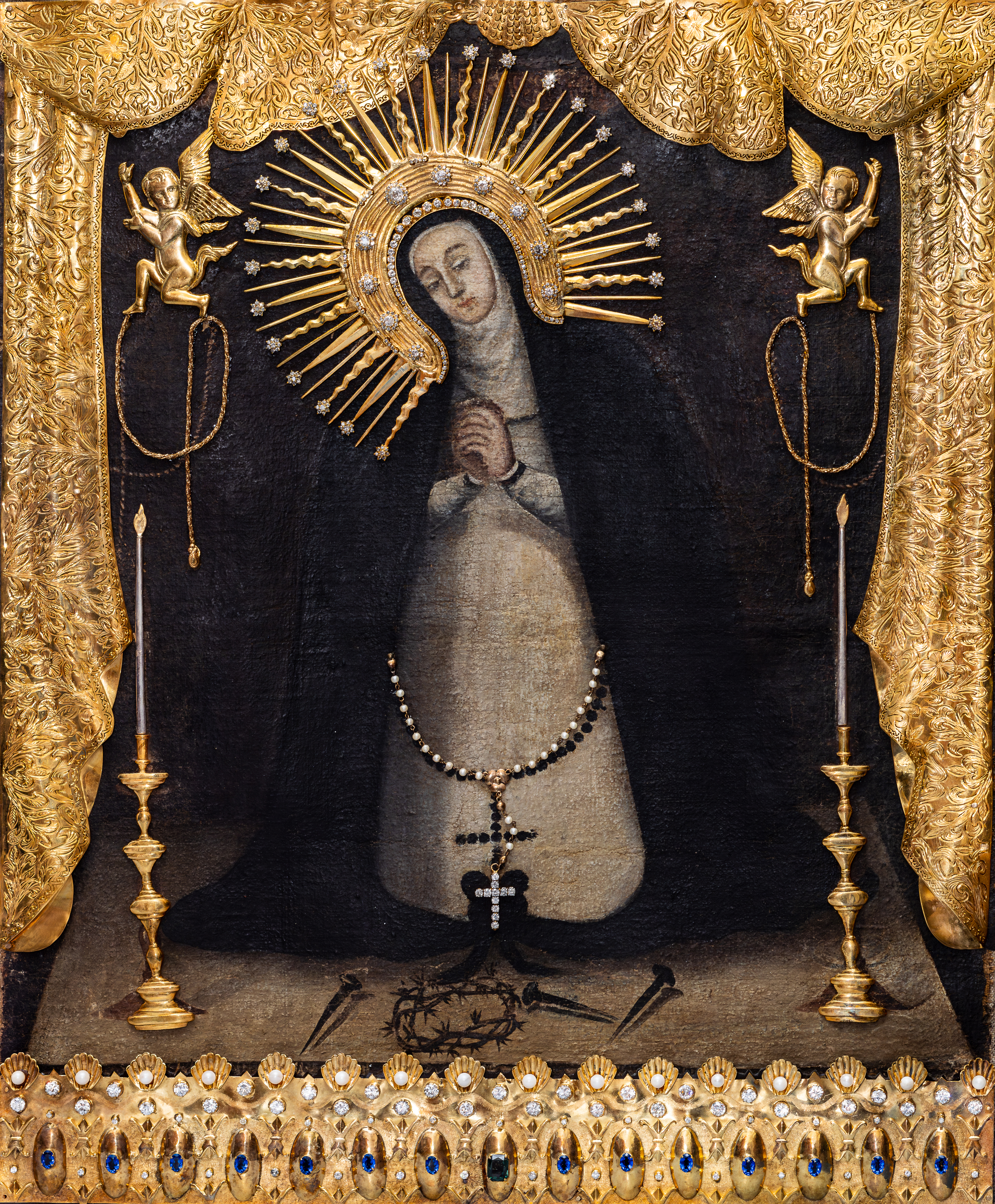
Nuestra Senora de la Soledad de Porta Vaga

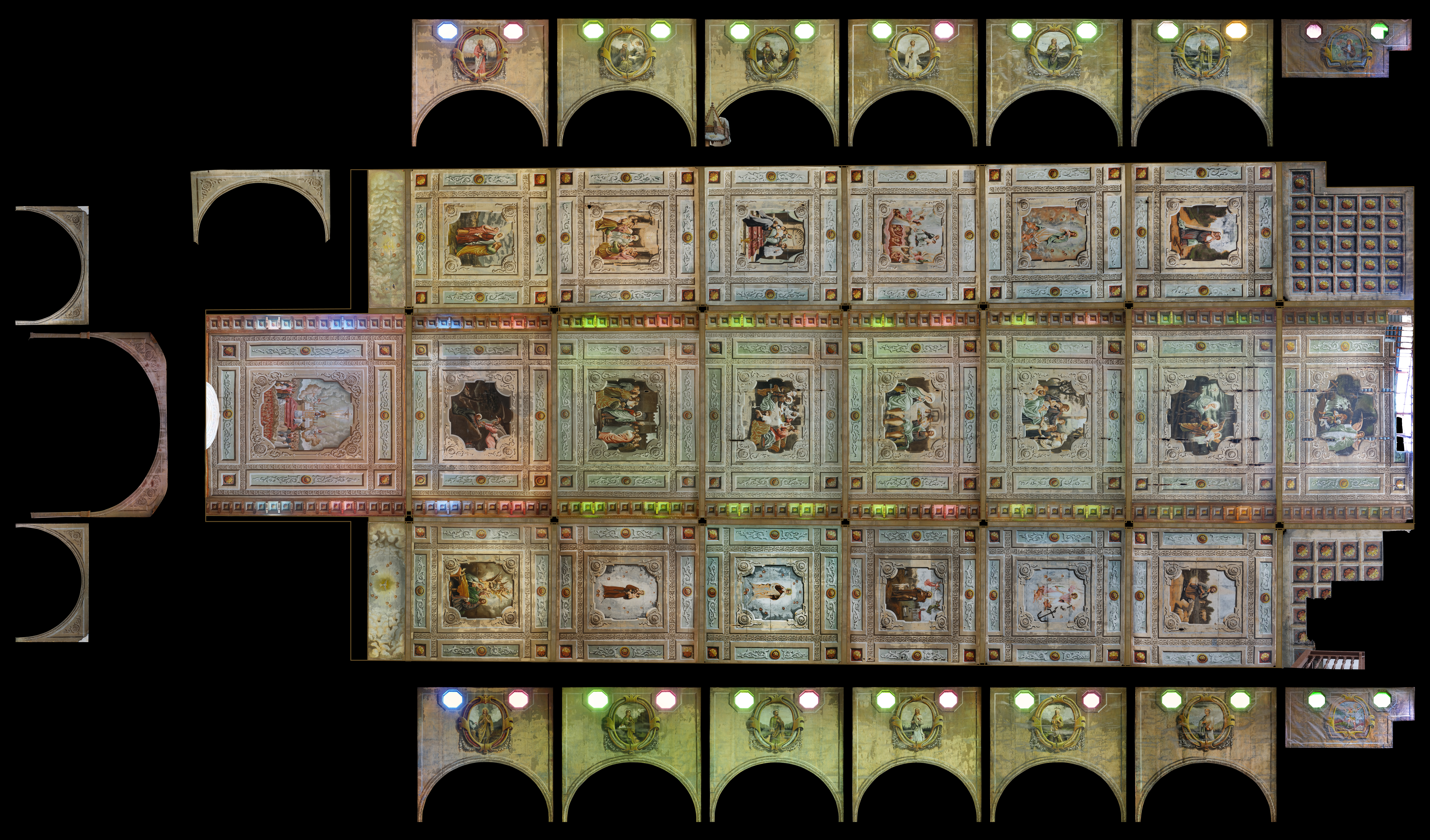
Lila Church ceiling painting

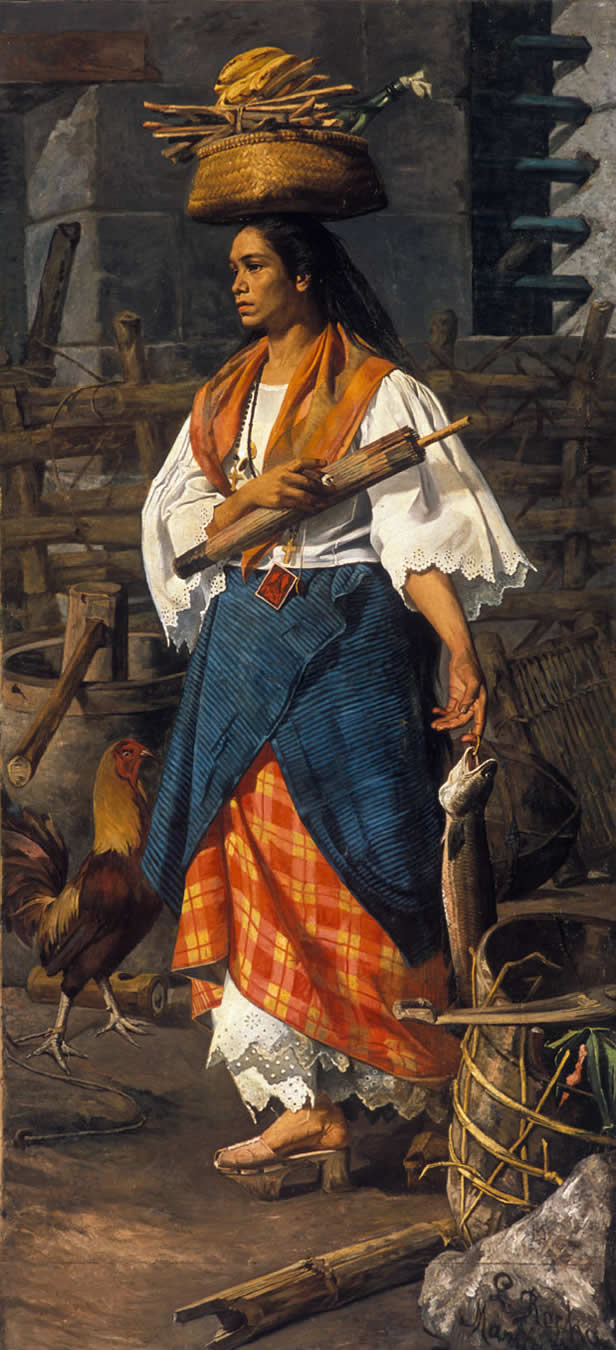
Lorenzo de la Rocha Icaza, Mujer filipina, 1895

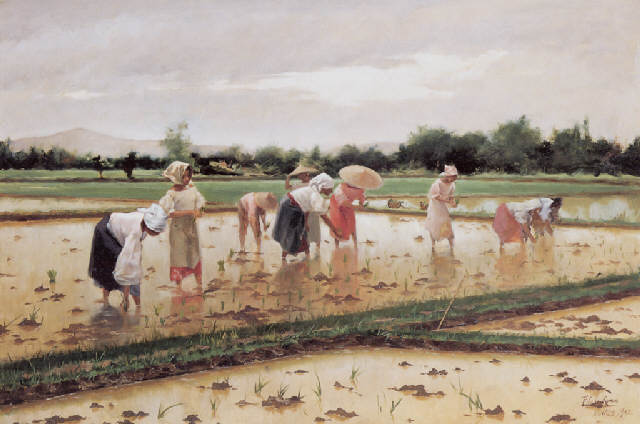
Fabián de la Rosa, Women Working in rice field, 1902

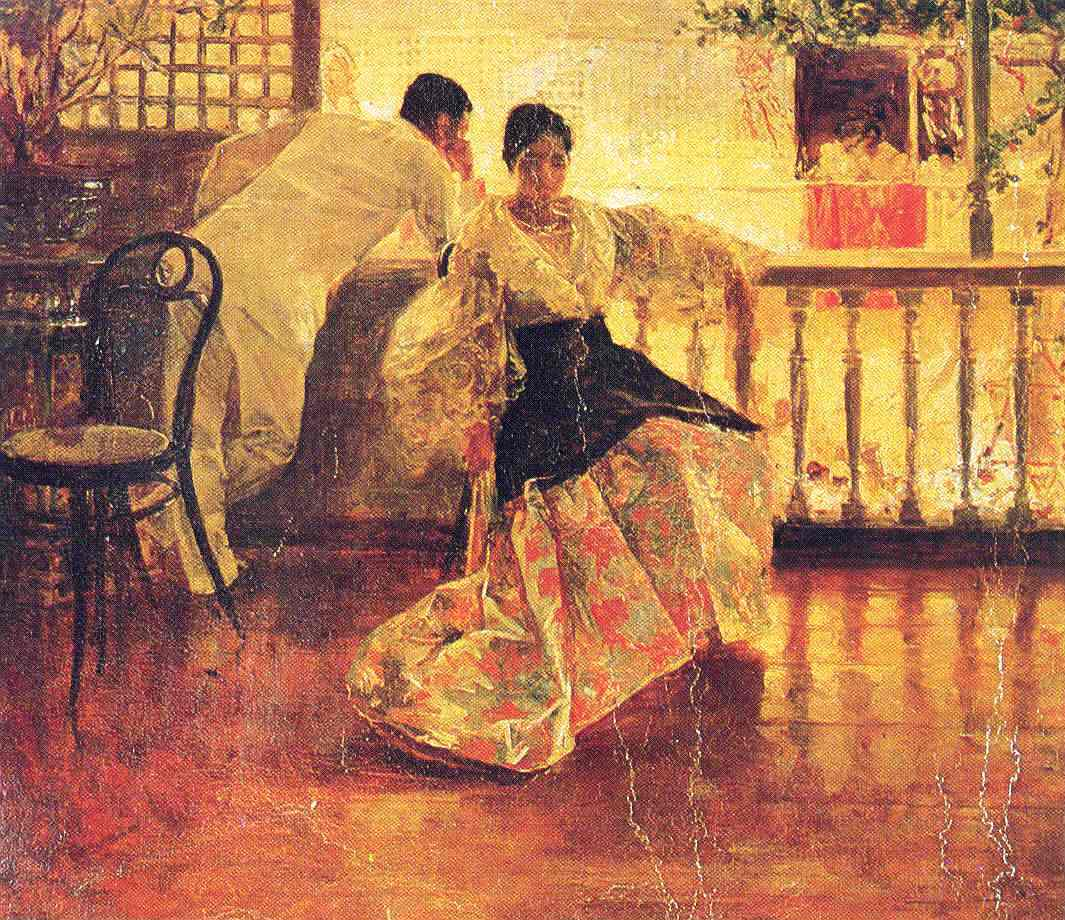
Juan Luna, Tampuhan, 1895

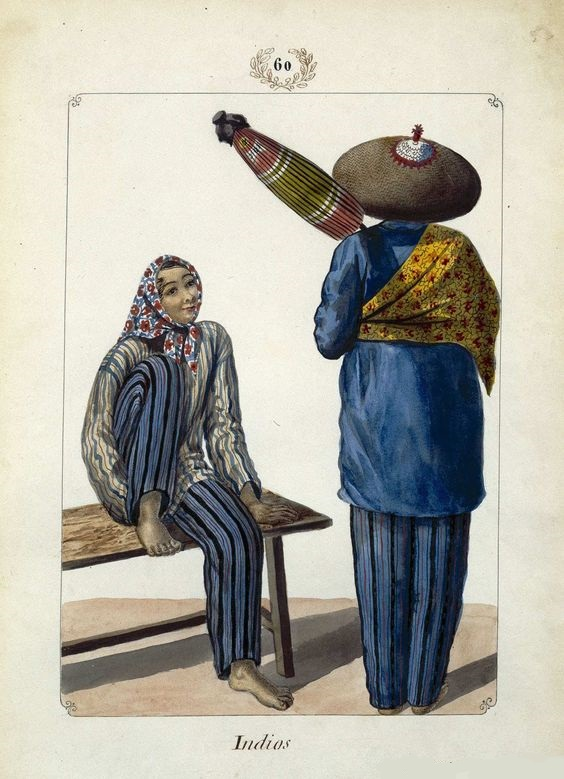
José Honorato Lozano, Indios, 1847

== Western ==
=== Egypt, Greece and Rome ===
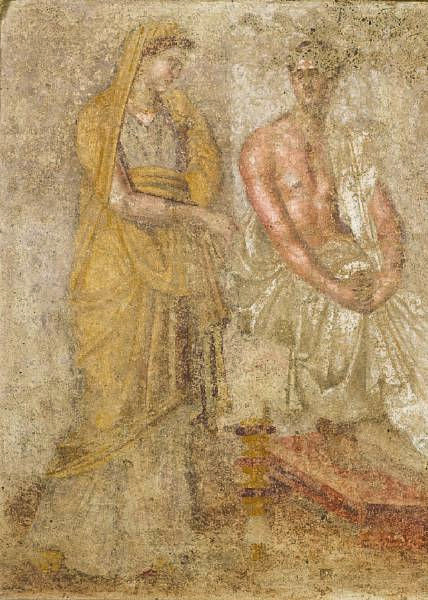
Hellenistic Greek terracotta funerary wall painting, 3rd century BC

Ancient Egypt, a civilization with very strong traditions of architecture and sculpture (both originally painted in bright colours) also had many mural paintings in temples and buildings, and painted illustrations on papyrus manuscripts. Egyptian wall painting and decorative painting is often graphic, sometimes more symbolic than realistic. Egyptian painting depicts figures in bold outline and flat silhouette, in which symmetry is a constant characteristic. Egyptian painting has close connection with its written language – called Egyptian hieroglyphs. Painted symbols are found amongst the first forms of written language. The Egyptians also painted on linen, remnants of which survive today. Ancient Egyptian paintings survived due to the extremely dry climate. The ancient Egyptians created paintings to make the afterlife of the deceased a pleasant place. The themes included journey through the afterworld or their protective deities introducing the deceased to the gods of the underworld. Some examples of such paintings are paintings of the gods and goddesses Ra, Horus, Anubis, Nut, Osiris and Isis. Some tomb paintings show activities that the deceased were involved in when they were alive and wished to carry on doing for eternity. In the New Kingdom and later, the Book of the Dead was buried with the entombed person. It was considered important for an introduction to the afterlife.

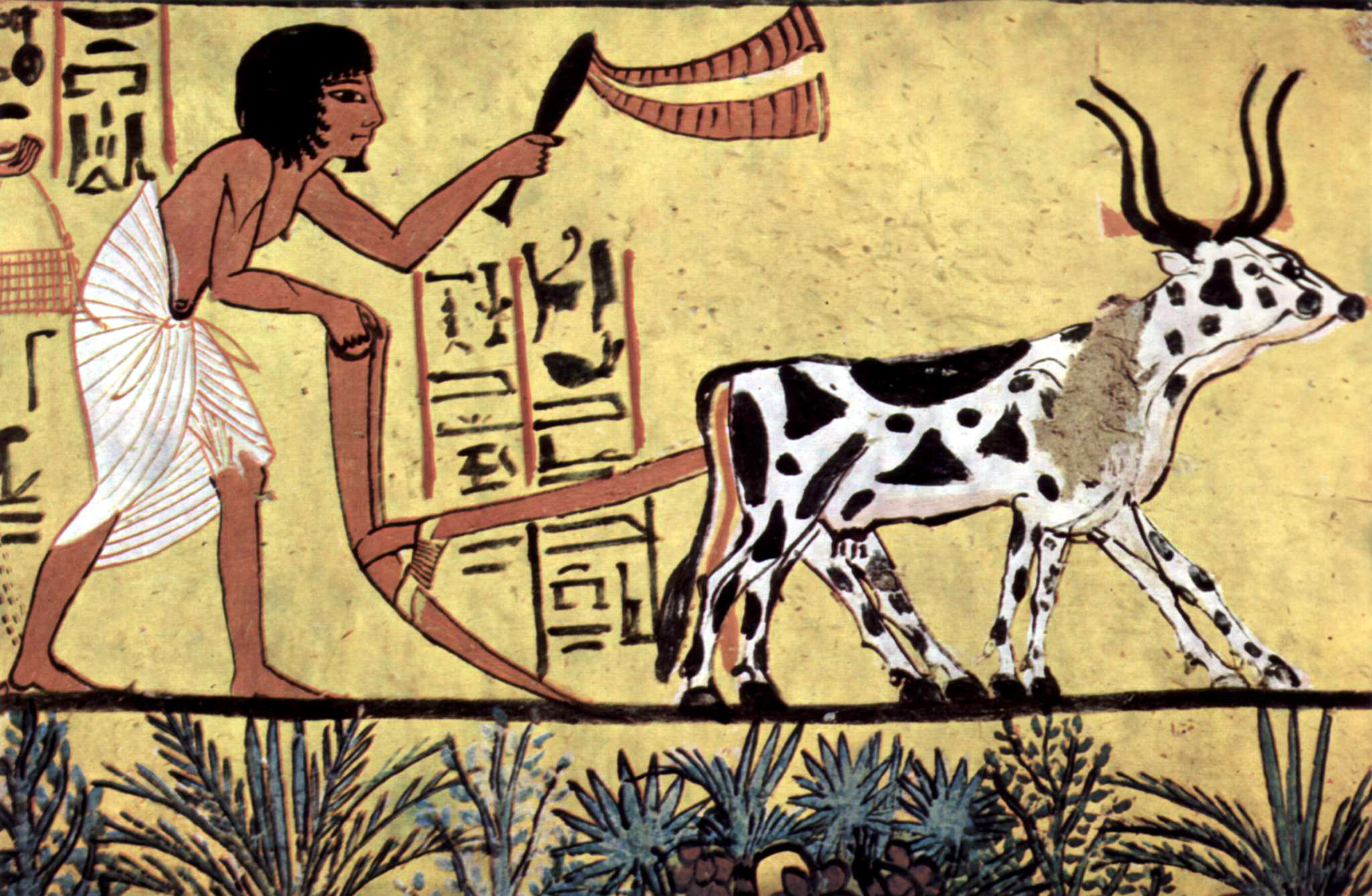
Sennedjem plows his fields with a pair of oxen, c. 1200 BC

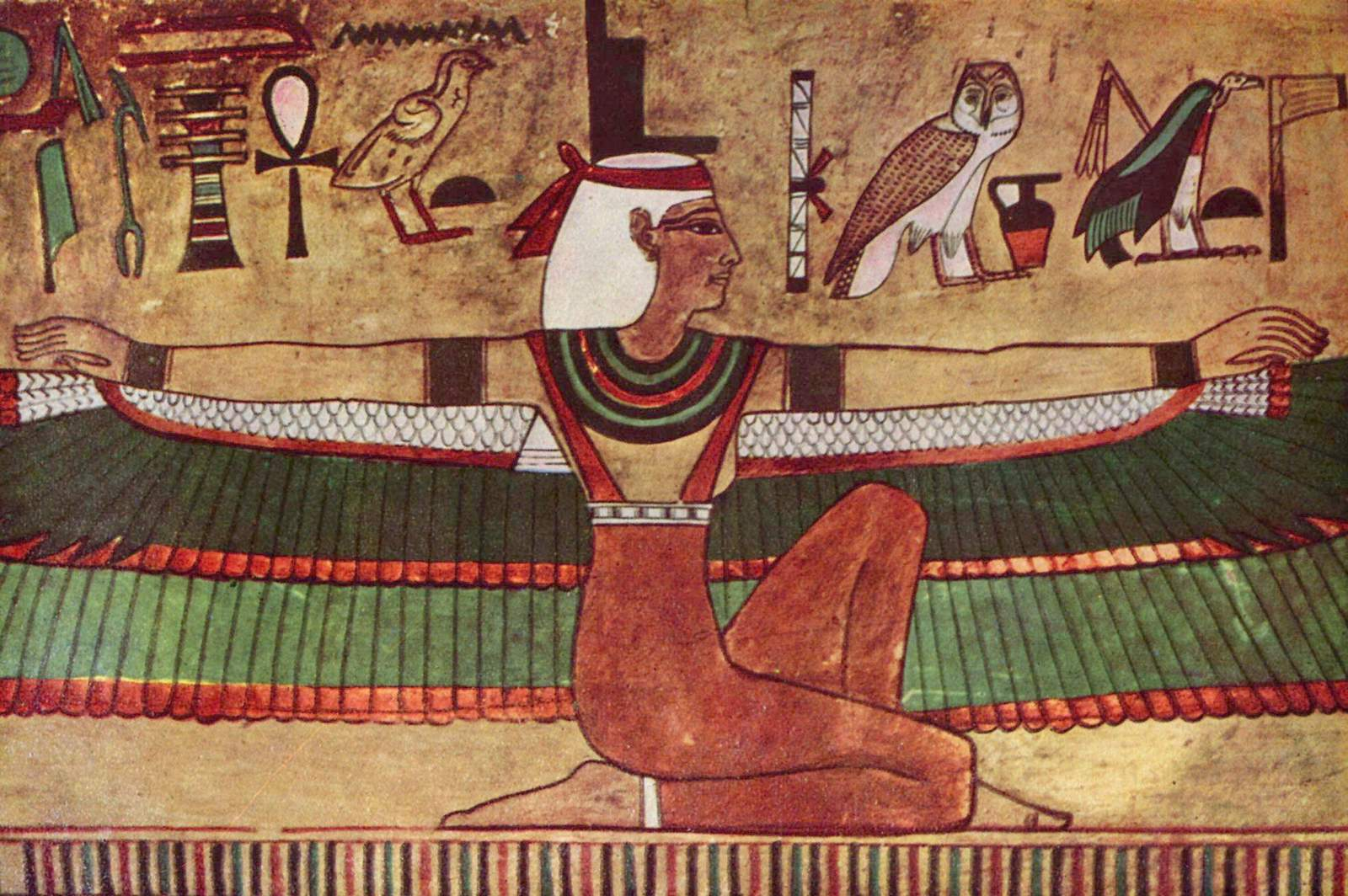
Ancient Egypt,The Goddess Isis, wall painting, c. 1360 BC

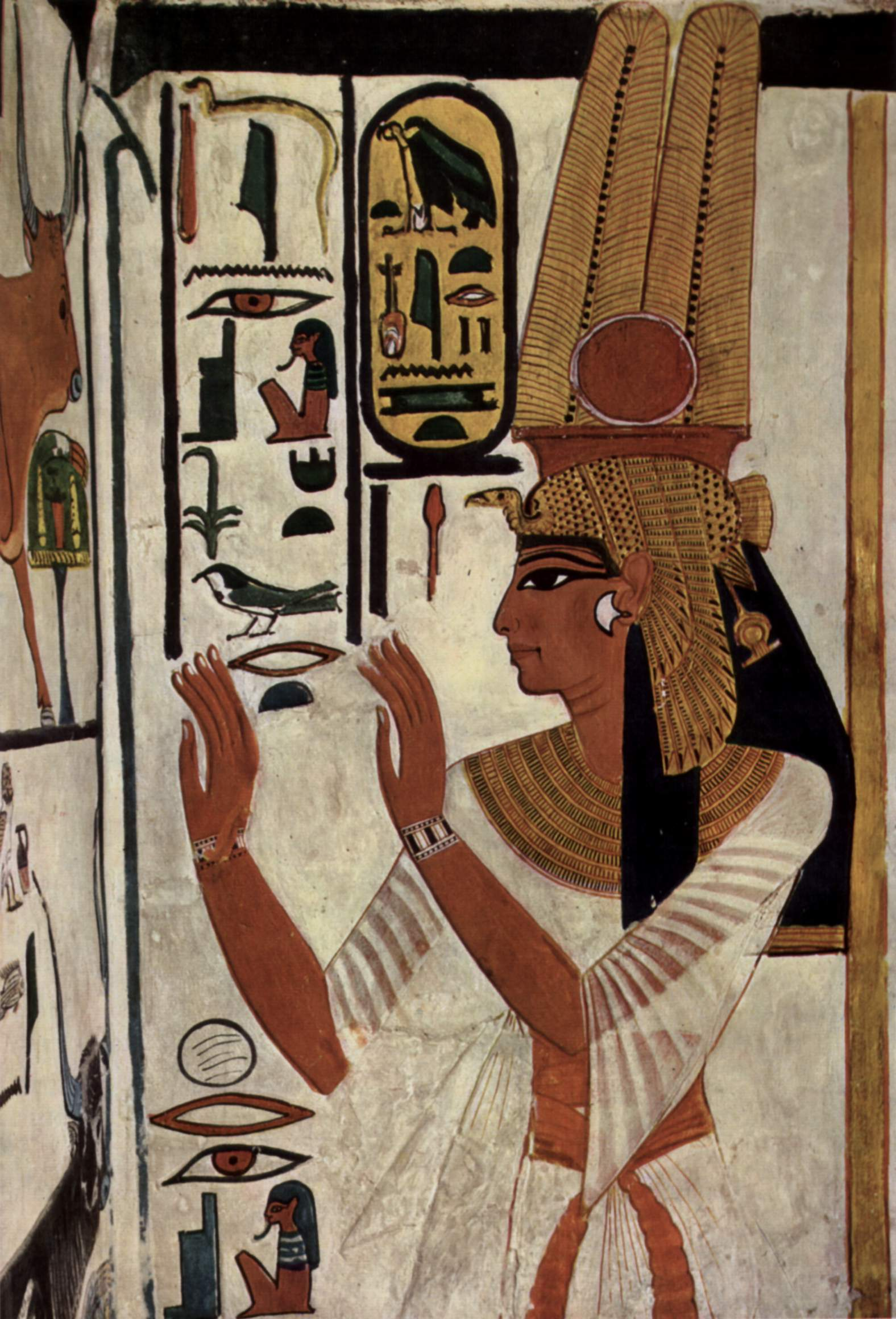
Ancient Egypt, Queen Nefertari

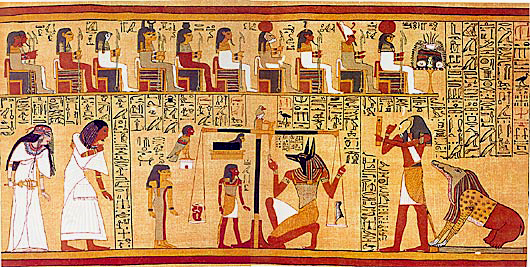
Ancient Egypt, papyrus

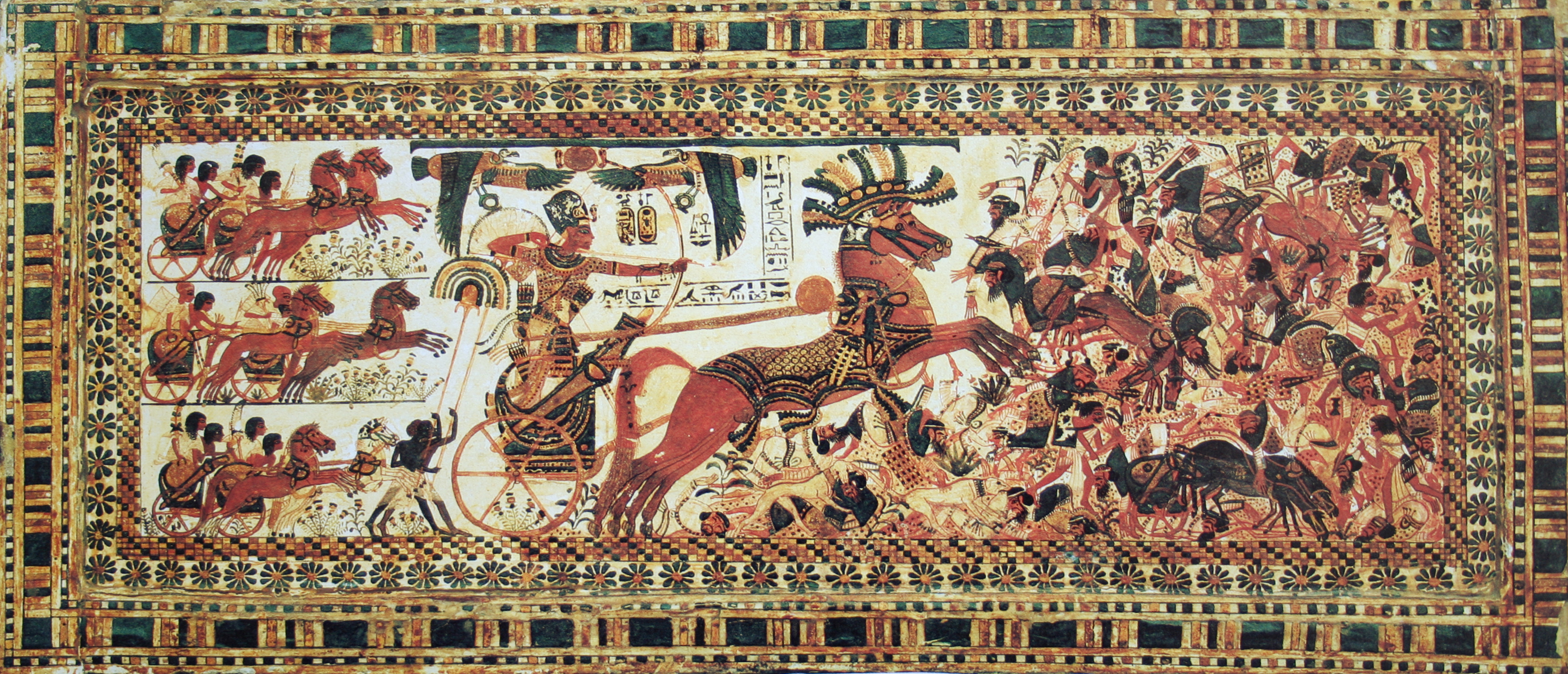
Ancient Egypt

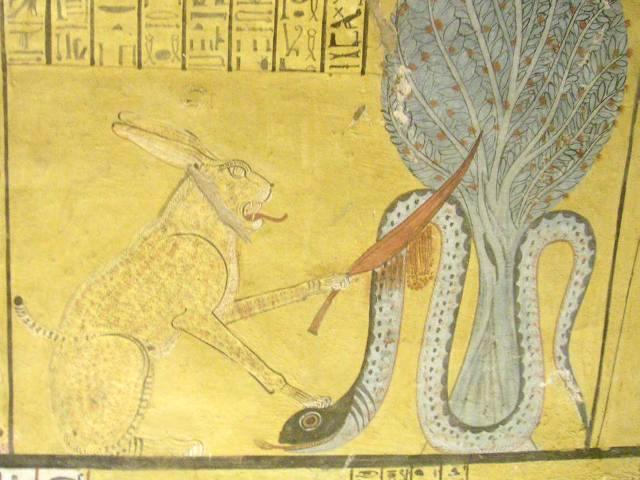
Ancient Egypt

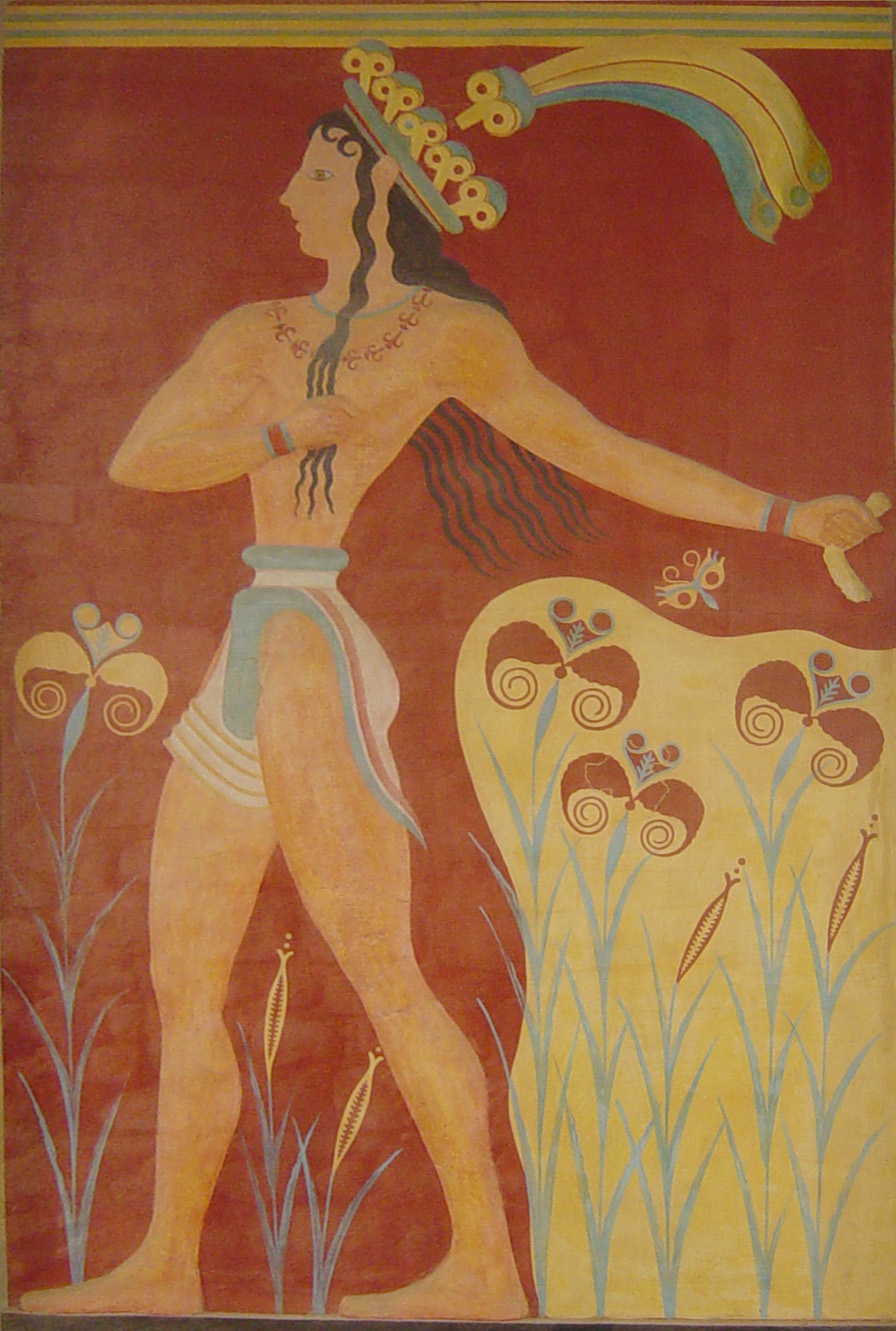
Knossos, Minoan civilization, Bronze Age Crete

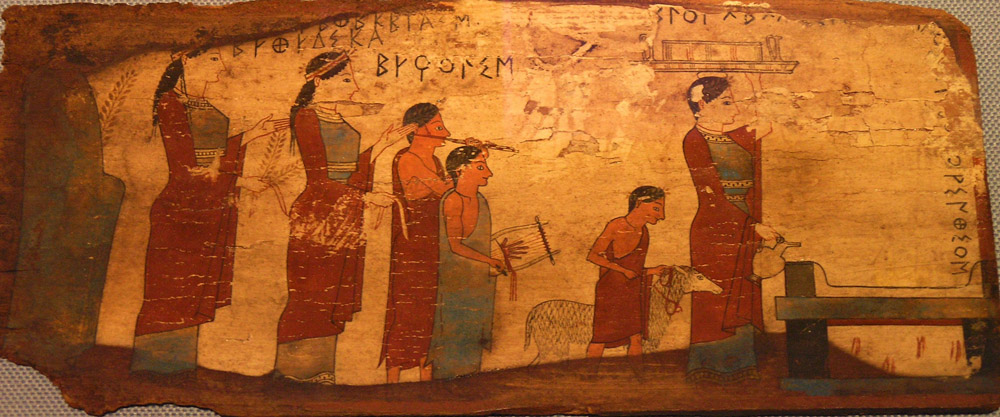
Pitsa panels, one of the few surviving panel paintings from Archaic Greece, c. 540–530 BC

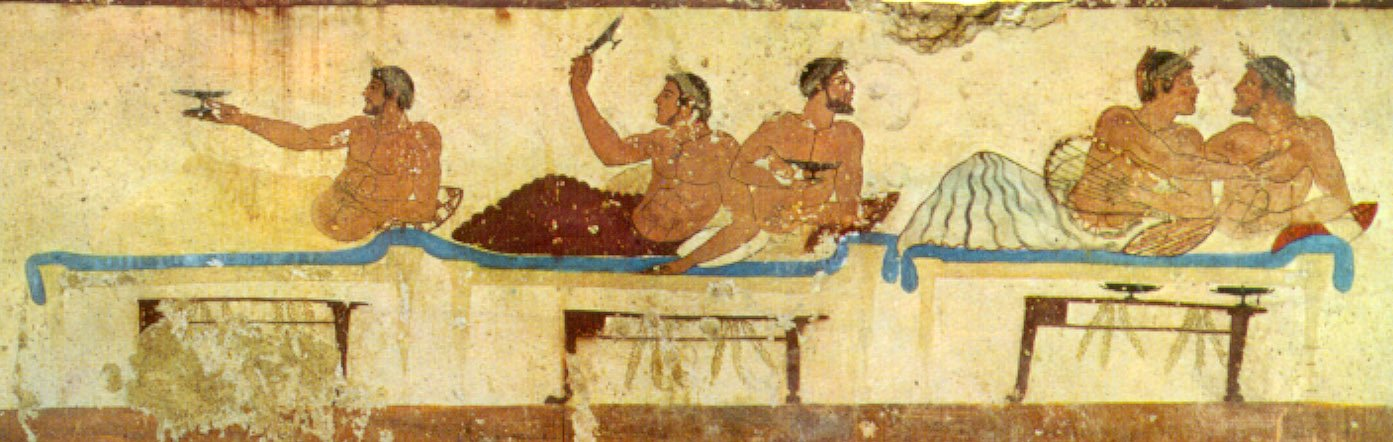
Symposium scene in the Tomb of the Diver at Paestum, circa 480 BC Greek art

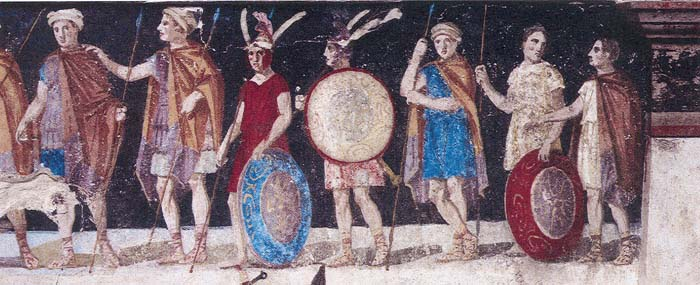
Mural of soldiers from Agios Athanasios, Thessaloniki, Ancient Macedonia, 4th century BC

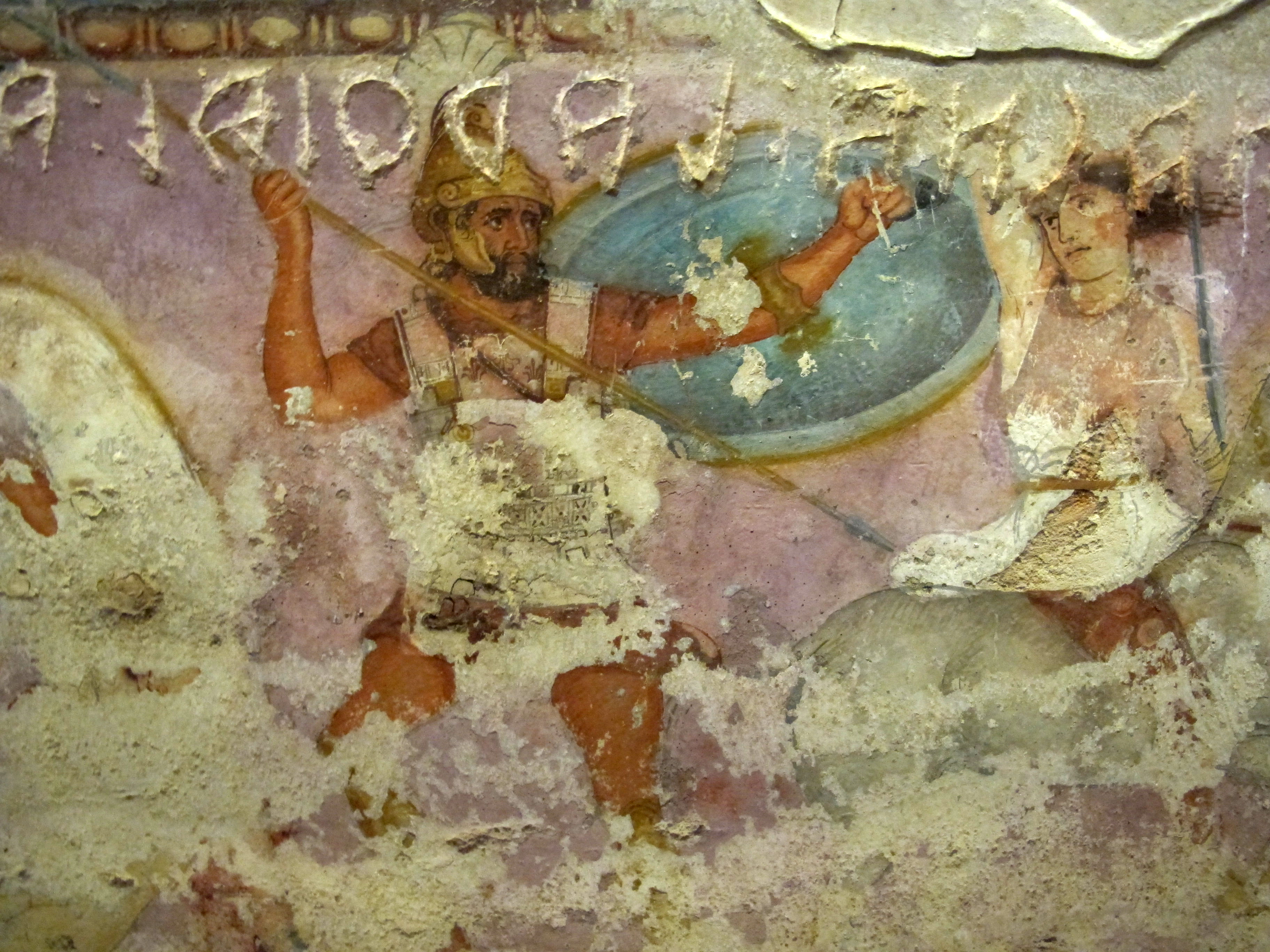
A Greek fighting an Amazon. Detail from painted sarcophagus found in Italy, 350-325 BC

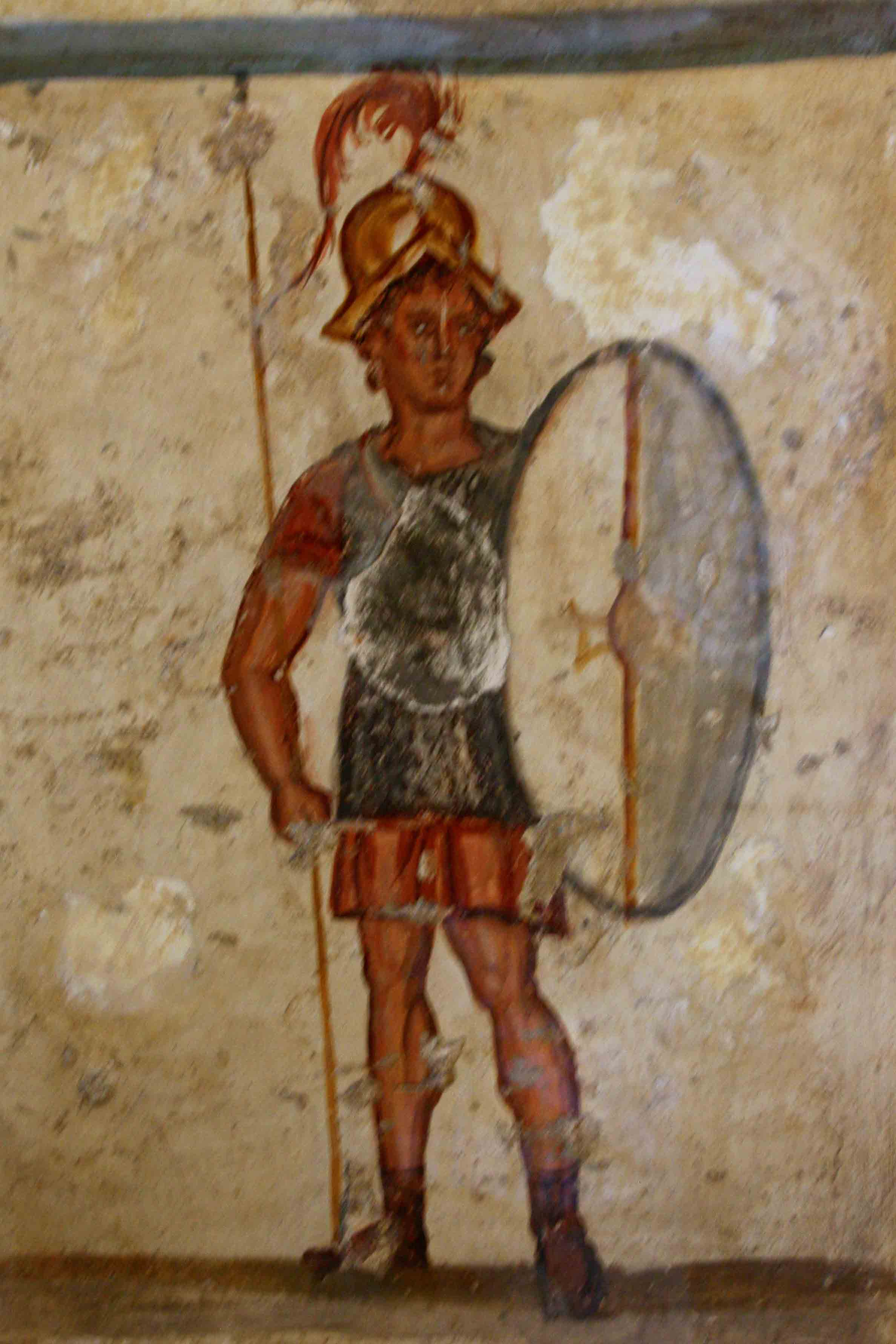
Fresco of an ancient Macedonian soldier (thorakitai) wearing chainmail armor and bearing a thureos shield, 3rd century BC

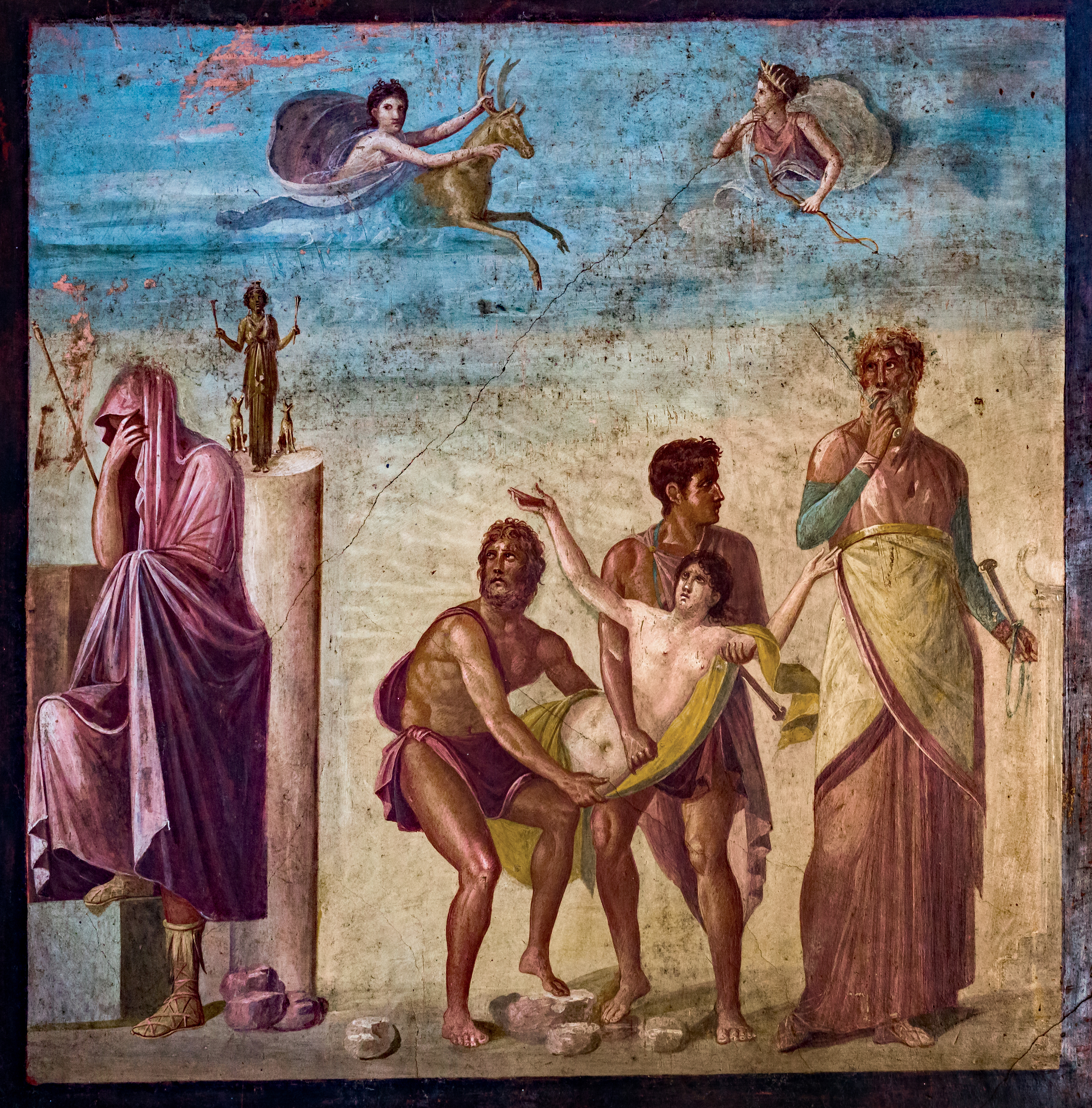
Fresco depicting sacrifice of Iphigenia

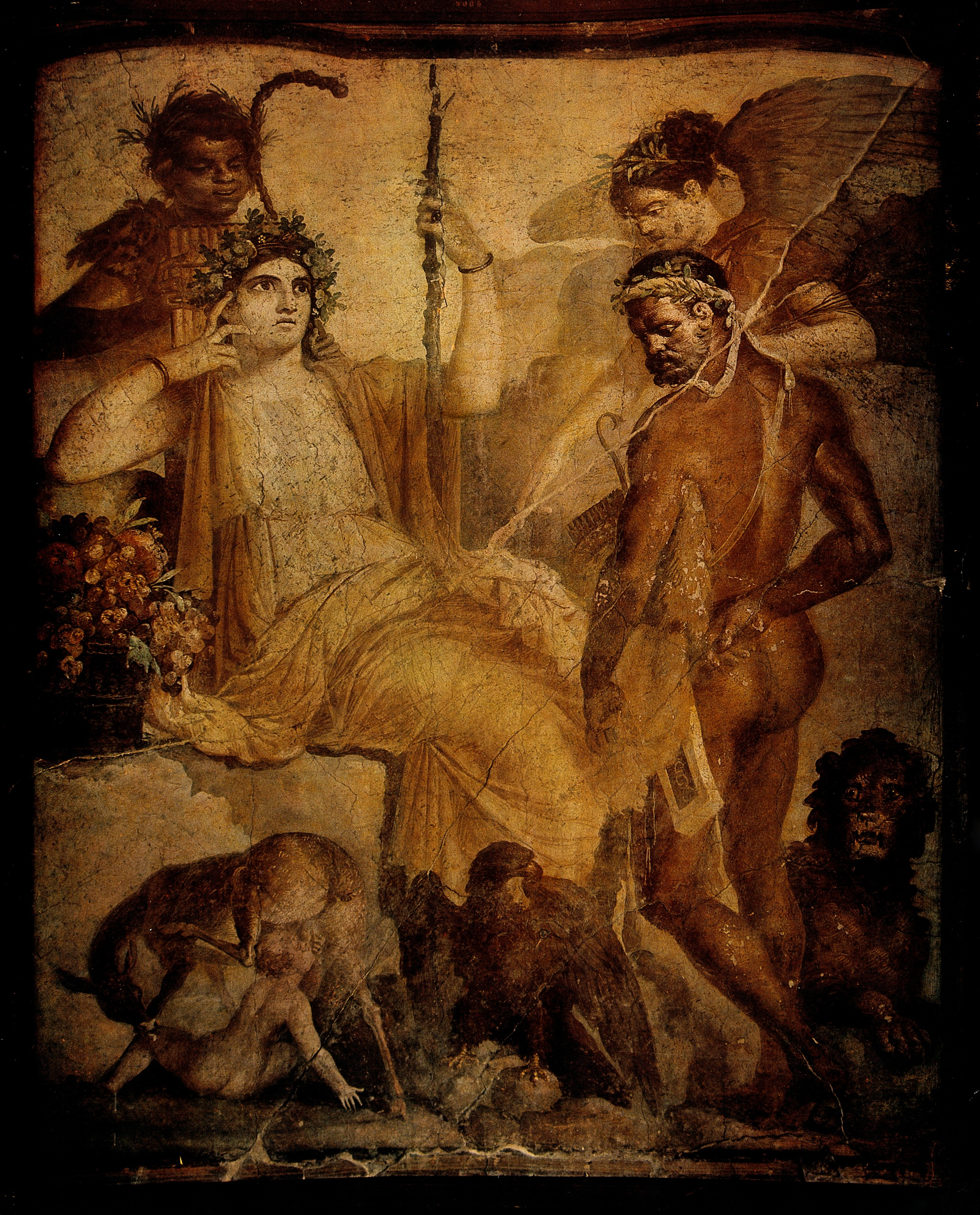
Roman art showing Hercules and Telephus

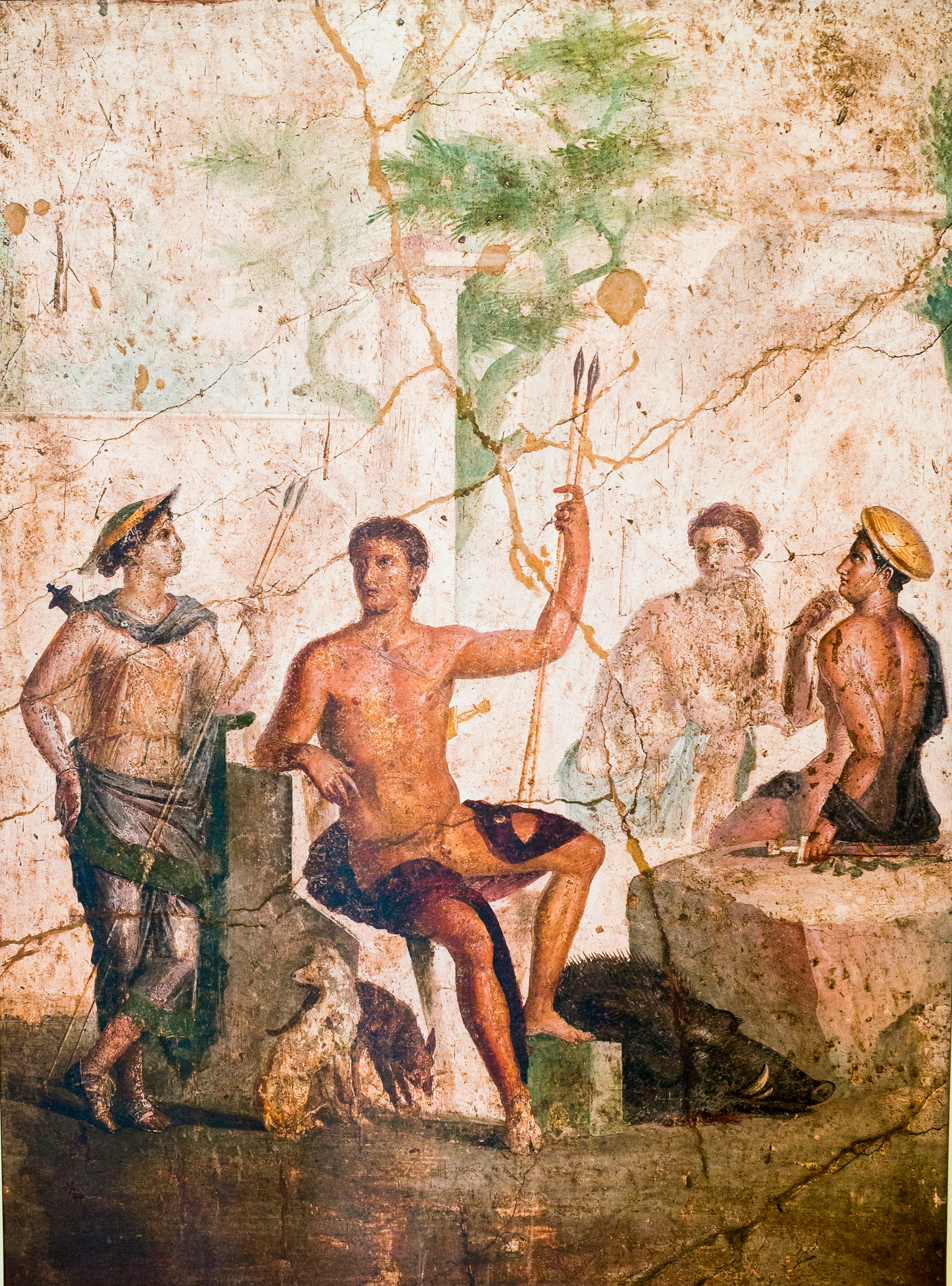
Roman art showing Meleager and Atalanta

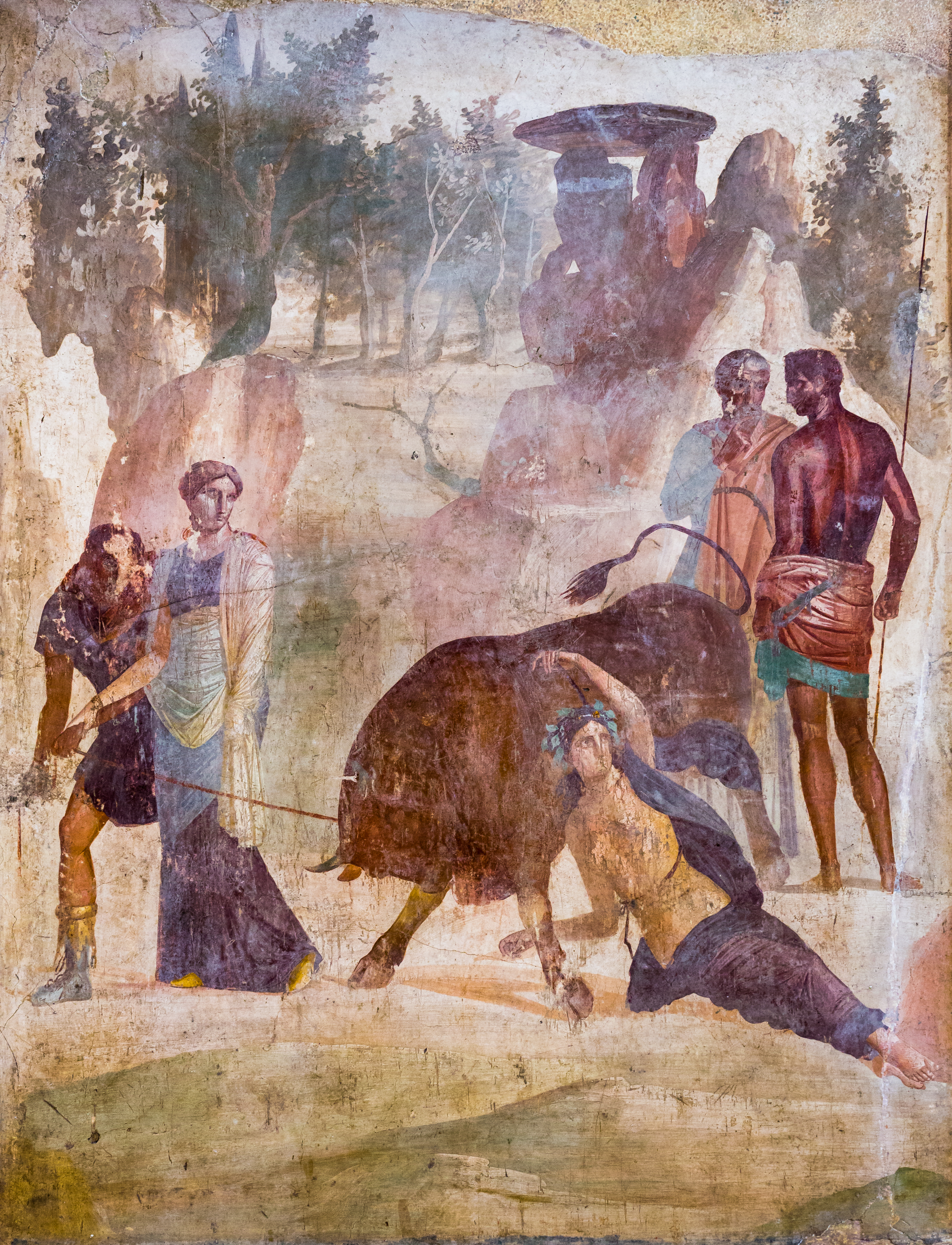
Roman art showing Dirce's punishment

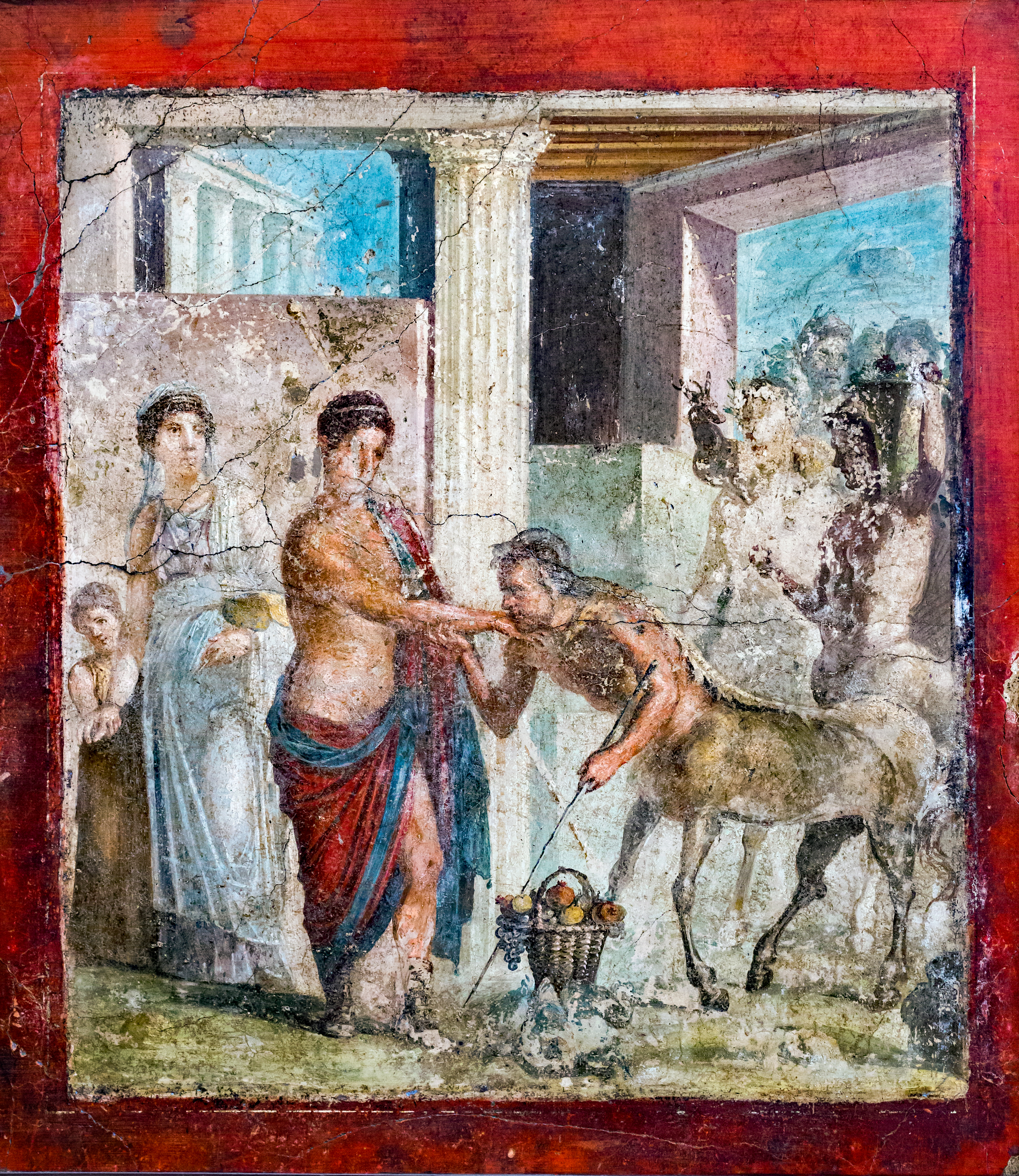
Roman art showing Pirithous and Hippodamia

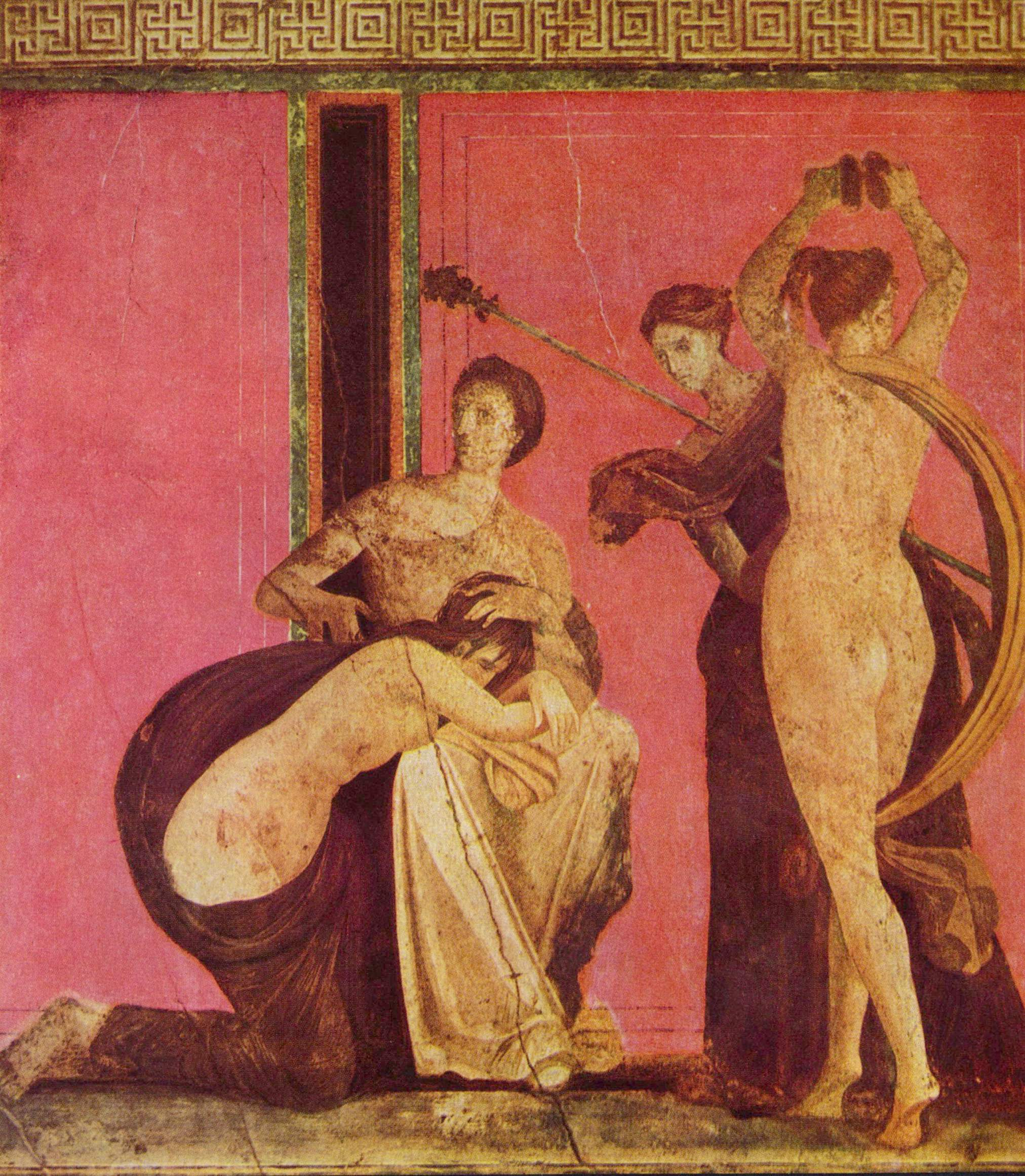
Roman art, Pompeii, Villa of the Mysteries, c. 60-50 BC

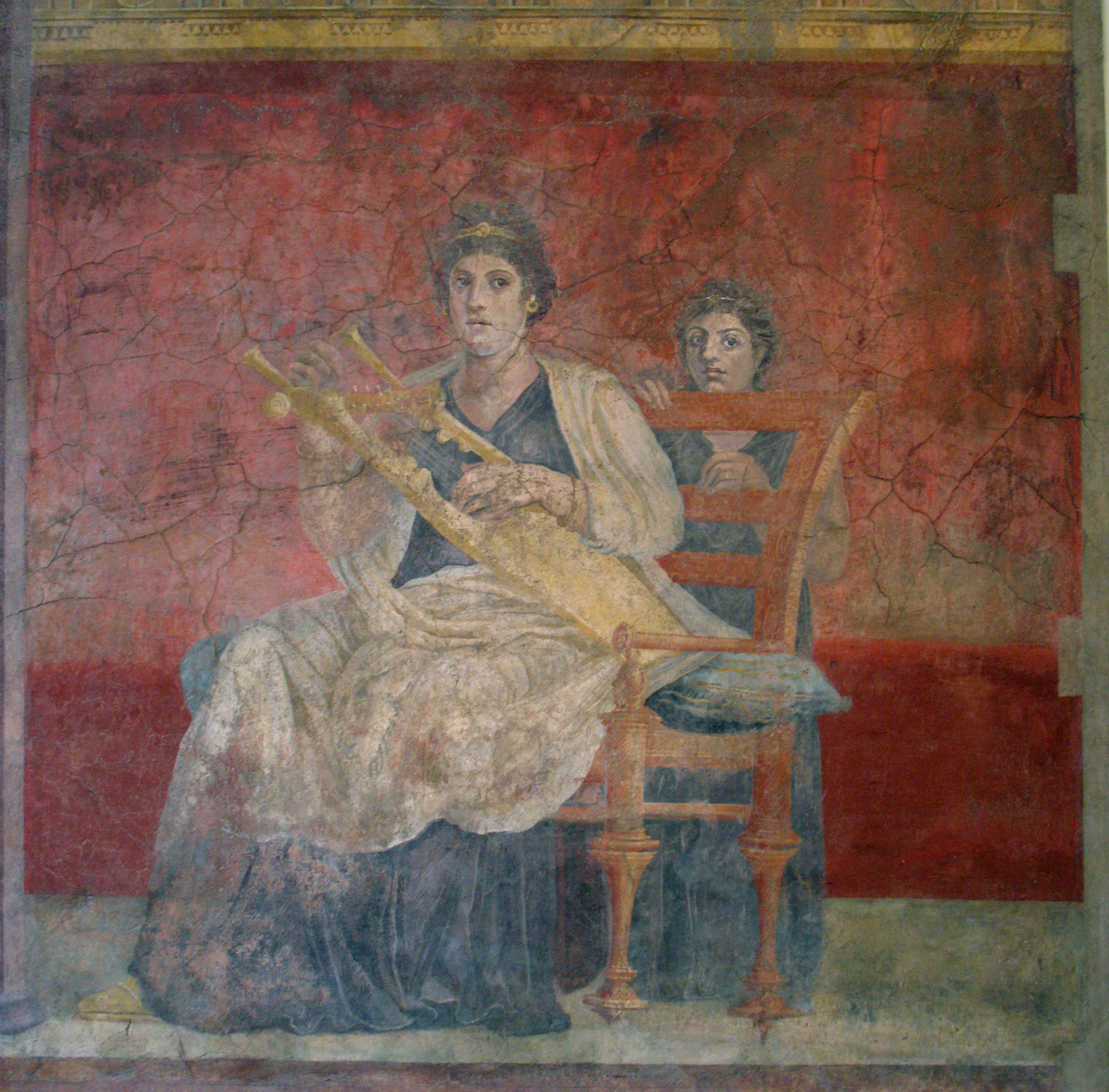
Roman art, Villa Boscoreale frescos, c. 40 BC

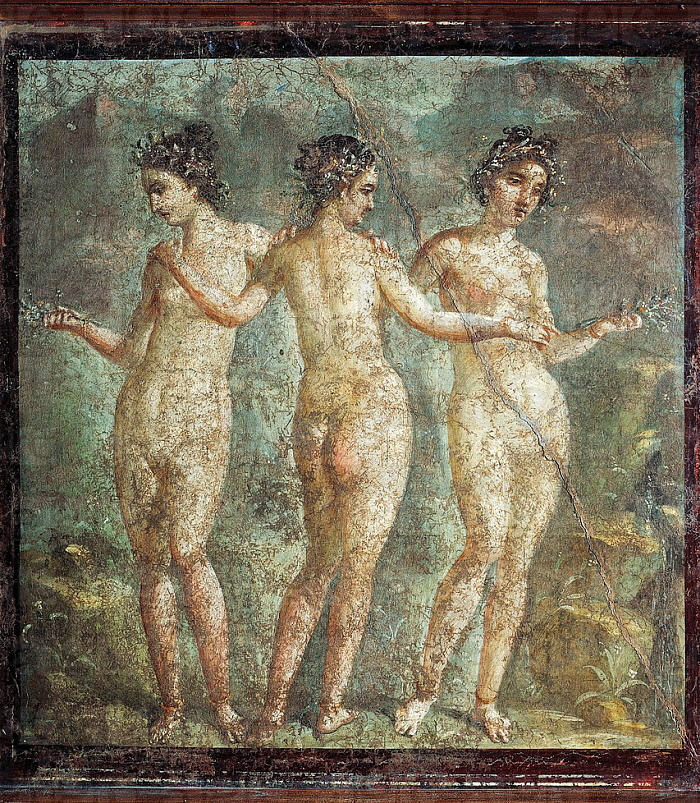
The Three Graces, fresco from Pompeii

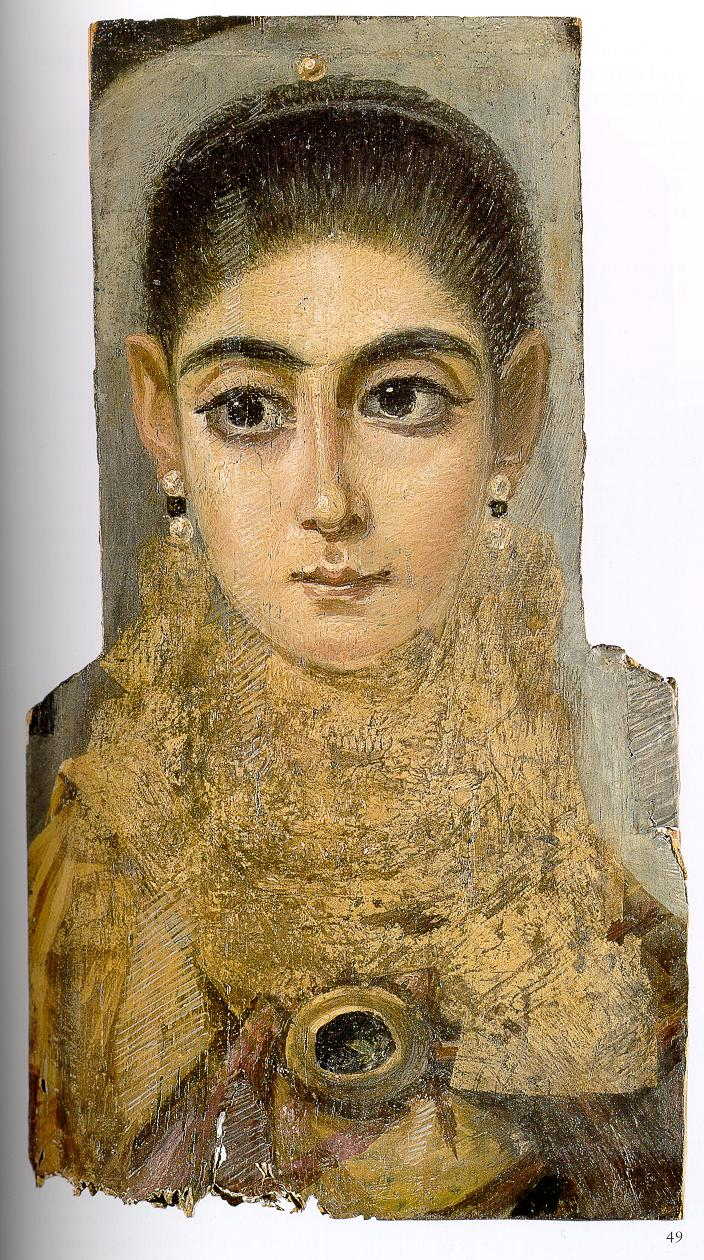
Roman art, Fayum mummy portraits from Roman Egypt

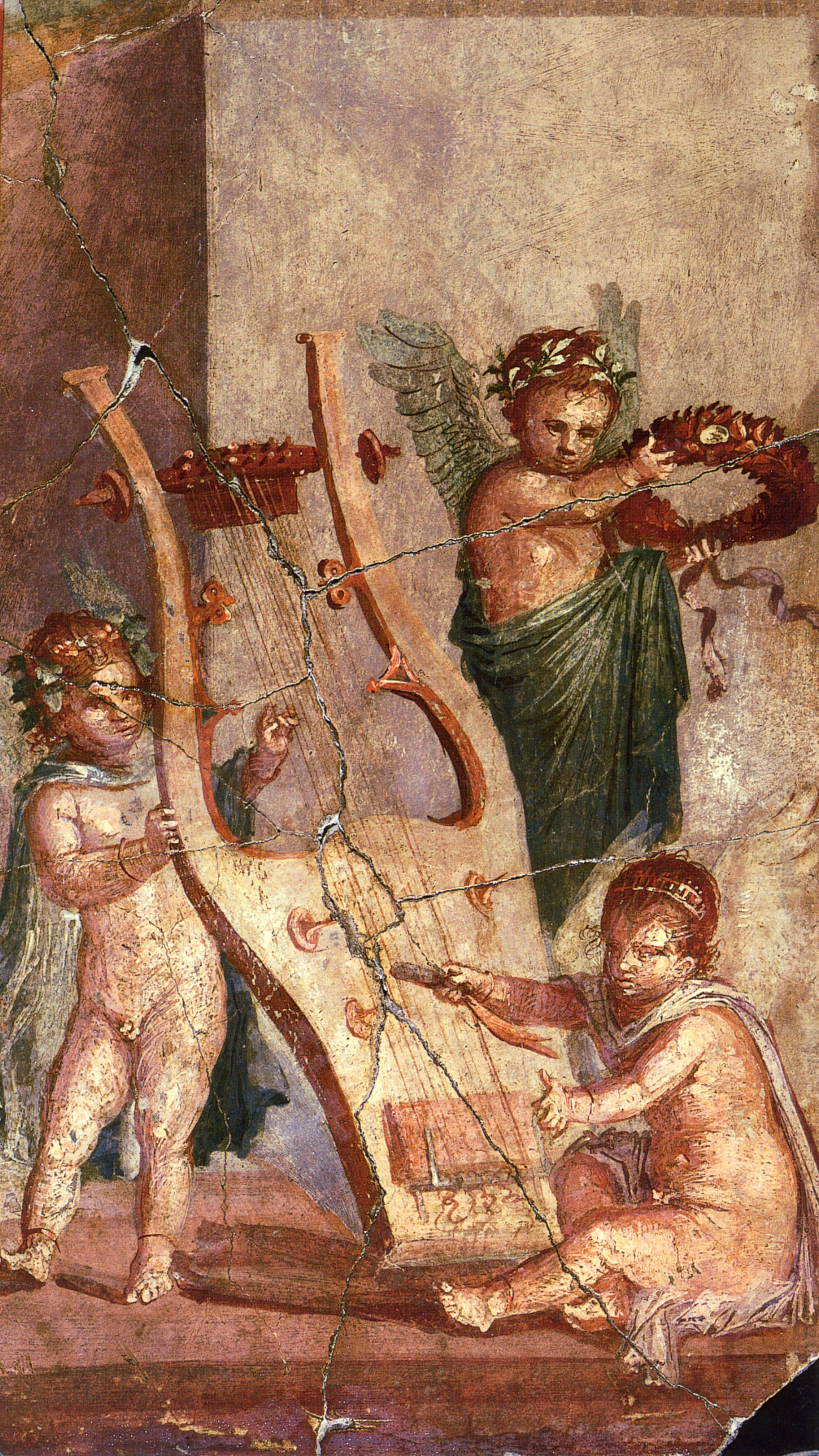
Cupids playing with a lyre, Roman fresco from Herculaneum

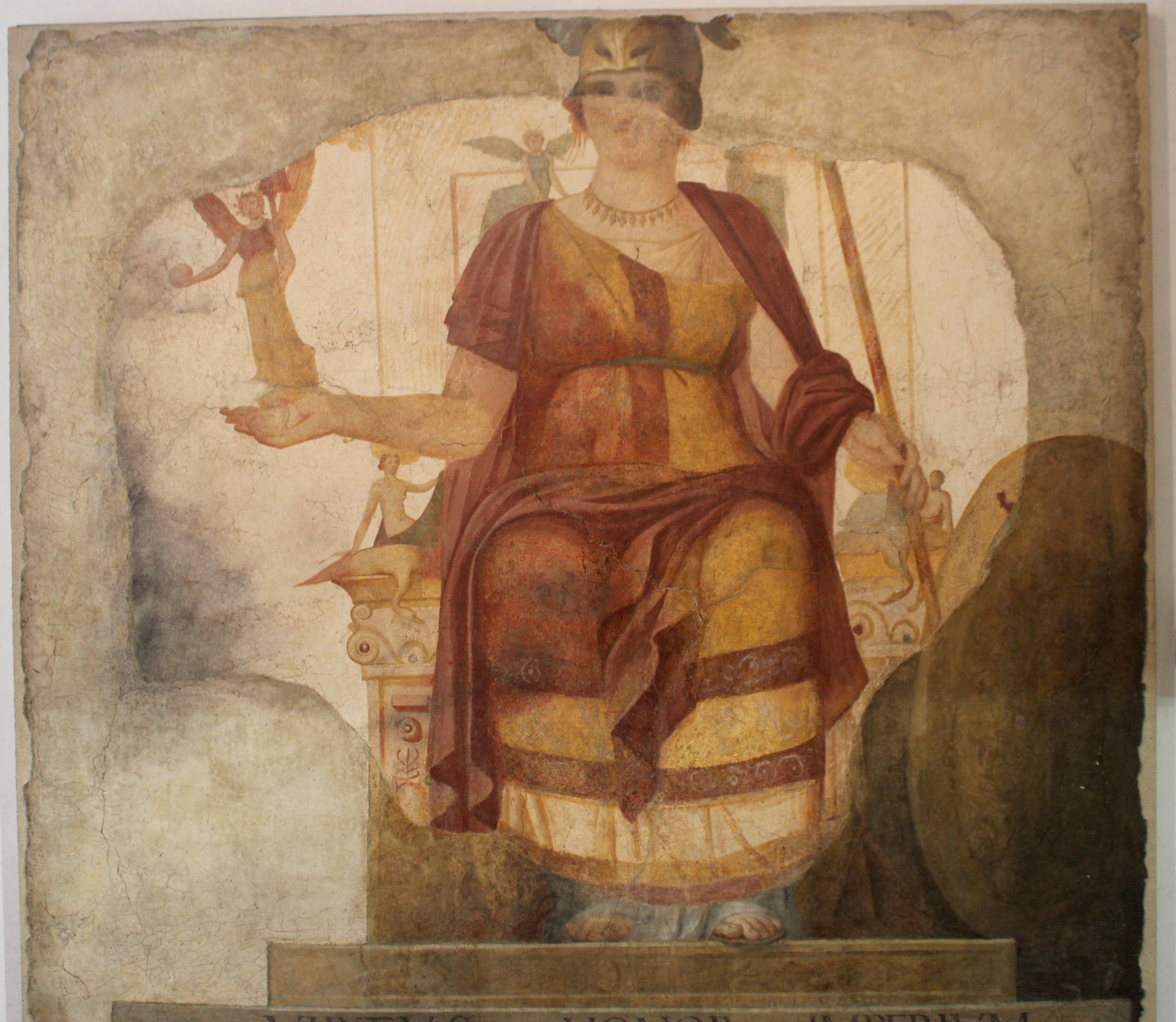
Roman fresco with a seated Venus, the so-called "Dea Barberini", 4th century AD

To the north of Egypt was the Minoan civilization centered on the island of Crete. The wall paintings found in the palace of Knossos are similar to that of the Egyptians but much more free in style. Mycenaean Greece, beginning around 1600 BC, produced similar art to that of Minoan Crete. Ancient Greek art during the Greek Dark Age became far less complex, but the renewal of Greek civilization throughout the Mediterranean during Archaic Greece brought about new forms of Greek art with the Orientalizing style.

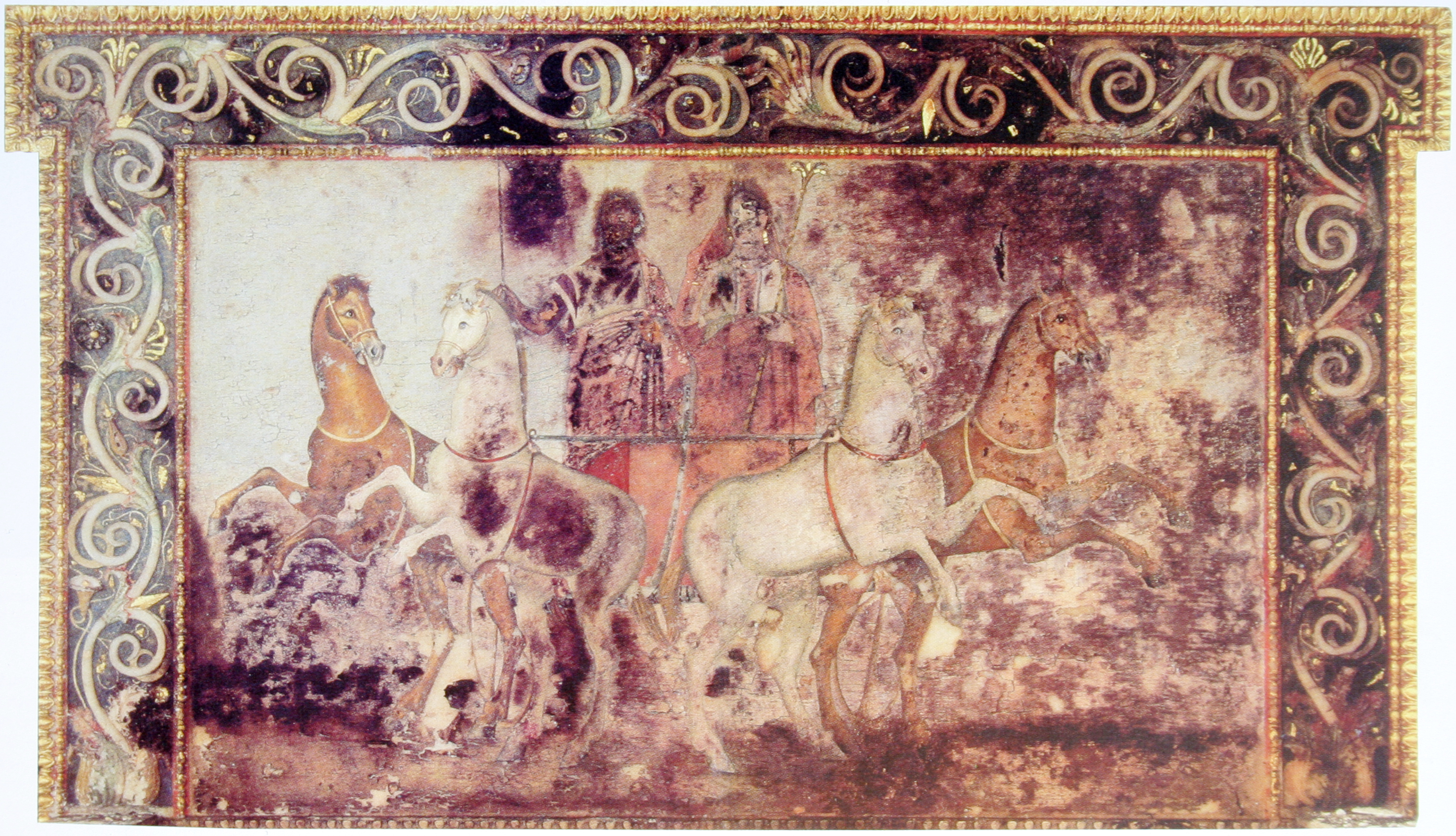
A fresco showing Hades and Persephone riding in a chariot, from the tomb of Queen Eurydice I of Macedon at Vergina, Greece, 4th century BC

Ancient Greece had skilled painters, sculptors (though both endeavours were regarded as mere manual labour at the time), and architects. The Parthenon is an example of their architecture that has lasted to modern days. Greek marble sculpture is often described as the highest form of Classical art. Painting on pottery of Ancient Greece and ceramics gives a particularly informative glimpse into the way society in Ancient Greece functioned. Black-figure vase painting and Red-figure vase painting gives many surviving examples of what Greek painting was. Some famous Greek painters on wooden panels who are mentioned in texts are Apelles, Zeuxis, and Parrhasius, however few examples of Ancient Greek panel painting survive, mostly just written descriptions by their contemporaries or later Romans. Zeuxis lived in 5–6 BC and was said to be the first to use sfumato. According to Pliny the Elder, the realism of his paintings was such that birds tried to eat the painted grapes. Apelles is described as the greatest painter of Antiquity for perfect technique in drawing, brilliant color and modeling.

Roman art was influenced by Greece and can in part be taken as a descendant of ancient Greek painting. However, Roman painting does have important unique characteristics. Surviving Roman paintings include wall paintings and frescoes, many from villas in Campania, in Southern Italy at sites such as Pompeii and Herculaneum. Such painting can be grouped into four main "styles" or periods and may contain the first examples of trompe-l'œil, pseudo-perspective, and pure landscape. Almost the only painted portraits surviving from the Ancient world are a large number of coffin-portraits of bust form found in the Late Antique cemetery of Al-Fayum. Although these were neither of the best period nor the highest quality, they are impressive in themselves, and give an idea of the quality that the finest ancient work must have had. A very small number of miniatures from Late Antique illustrated books also survive, and a rather larger number of copies of them from the early medieval period.

=== Middle Ages ===
The rise of Christianity imparted a different spirit and aim to painting styles. Byzantine art, once its style was established by the 6th century, placed great emphasis on retaining traditional iconography and style, and gradually evolved during the thousand years of the Byzantine Empire and the living traditions of Greek and Russian Orthodox icon-painting. Byzantine painting has a hieratic feeling and icons were and still are seen as a representation of divine revelation. There were many frescos, but fewer of these have survived than mosaics. Byzantine art has been compared to contemporary abstraction, in its flatness and highly stylised depictions of figures and landscape. Some periods of Byzantine art, especially the so-called Macedonian art of around the 10th century, are more flexible in approach. Frescos of the Palaeologian Renaissance of the early 14th century survive in the Chora Church in Istanbul.

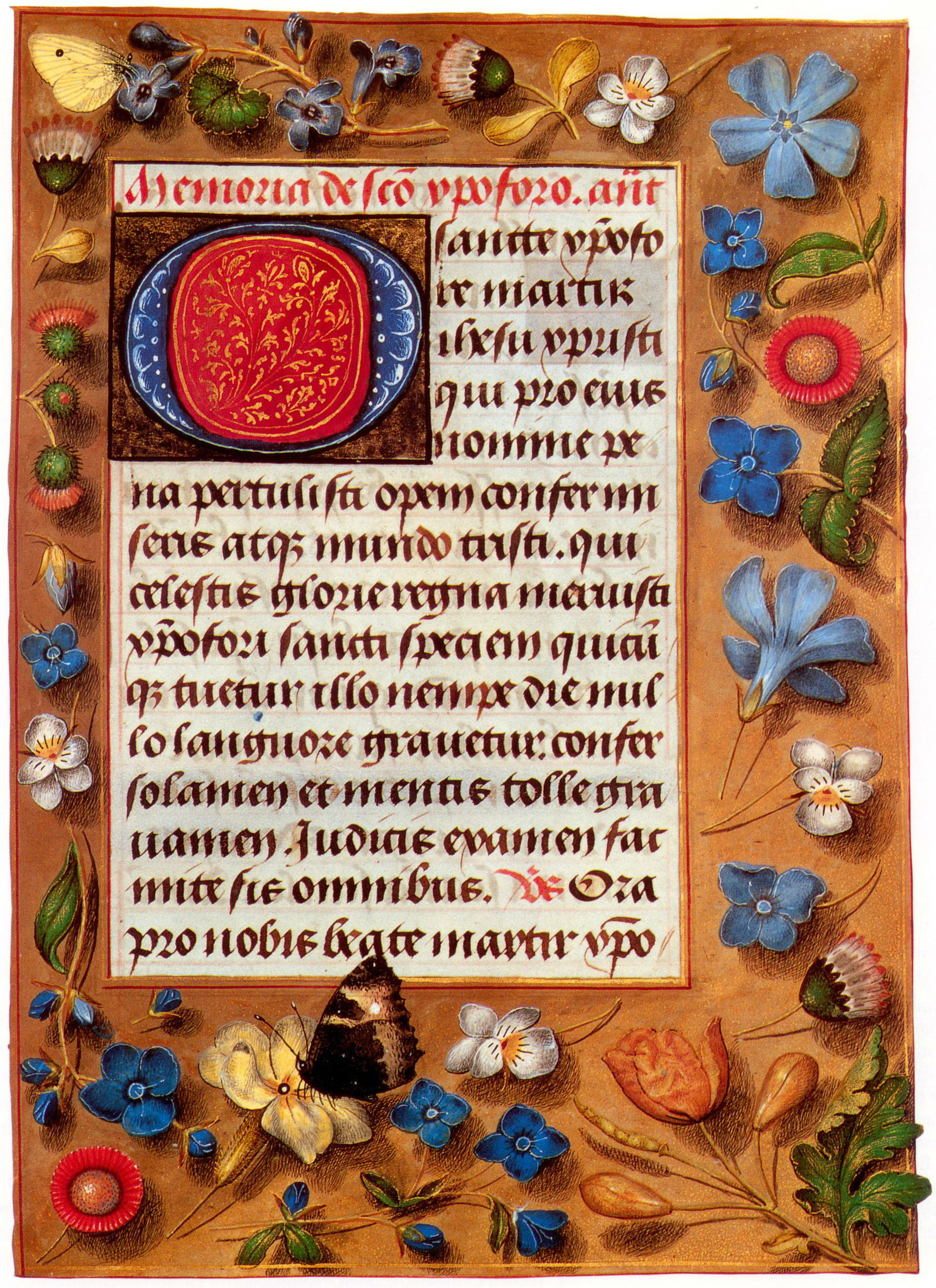
Book of Hours

In post-Antique Catholic Europe the first distinctive artistic style to emerge that included painting was the Insular art of the British Isles, where the only surviving examples are miniatures in Illuminated manuscripts such as the Book of Kells. These are most famous for their abstract decoration, although figures, and sometimes scenes, were also depicted, especially in Evangelist portraits. Carolingian and Ottonian art also survives mostly in manuscripts, although some wall-painting remain, and more are documented. The art of this period combines Insular and "barbarian" influences with a strong Byzantine influence and an aspiration to recover classical monumentality and poise.

Walls of Romanesque and Gothic churches were decorated with frescoes as well as sculpture and many of the few remaining murals have great intensity, and combine the decorative energy of Insular art with a new monumentality in the treatment of figures. Far more miniatures in Illuminated manuscripts survive from the period, showing the same characteristics, which continue into the Gothic period.

Panel painting becomes more common during the Romanesque period, under the heavy influence of Byzantine icons. Towards the middle of the 13th century, Medieval art and Gothic painting became more realistic, with the beginnings of interest in the depiction of volume and perspective in Italy with Cimabue and then his pupil Giotto. From Giotto on, the treatment of composition by the best painters also became much more free and innovative. They are considered to be the two great medieval masters of painting in western culture. Cimabue, within the Byzantine tradition, used a more realistic and dramatic approach to his art. His pupil, Giotto, took these innovations to a higher level which in turn set the foundations for the western painting tradition. Both artists were pioneers in the move towards naturalism.

Churches were built with more and more windows and the use of colorful stained glass become a staple in decoration. One of the most famous examples of this is found in the cathedral of Notre Dame de Paris. By the 14th century Western societies were both richer and more cultivated and painters found new patrons in the nobility and even the bourgeoisie. Illuminated manuscripts took on a new character and slim, fashionably dressed court women were shown in their landscapes. This style soon became known as International style and tempera panel paintings and altarpieces gained importance.

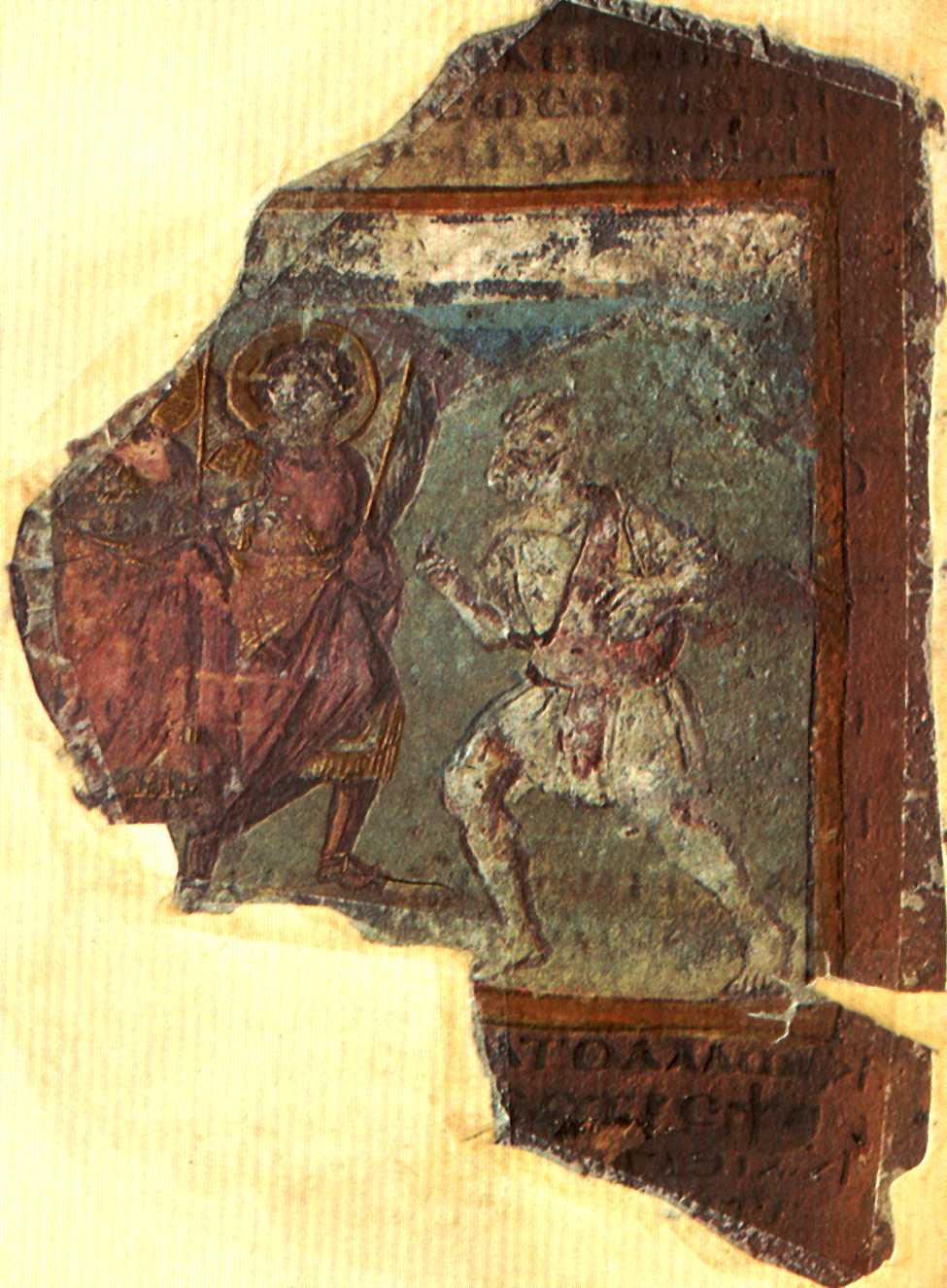
Cotton Genesis A miniature of Abraham Meeting Angels

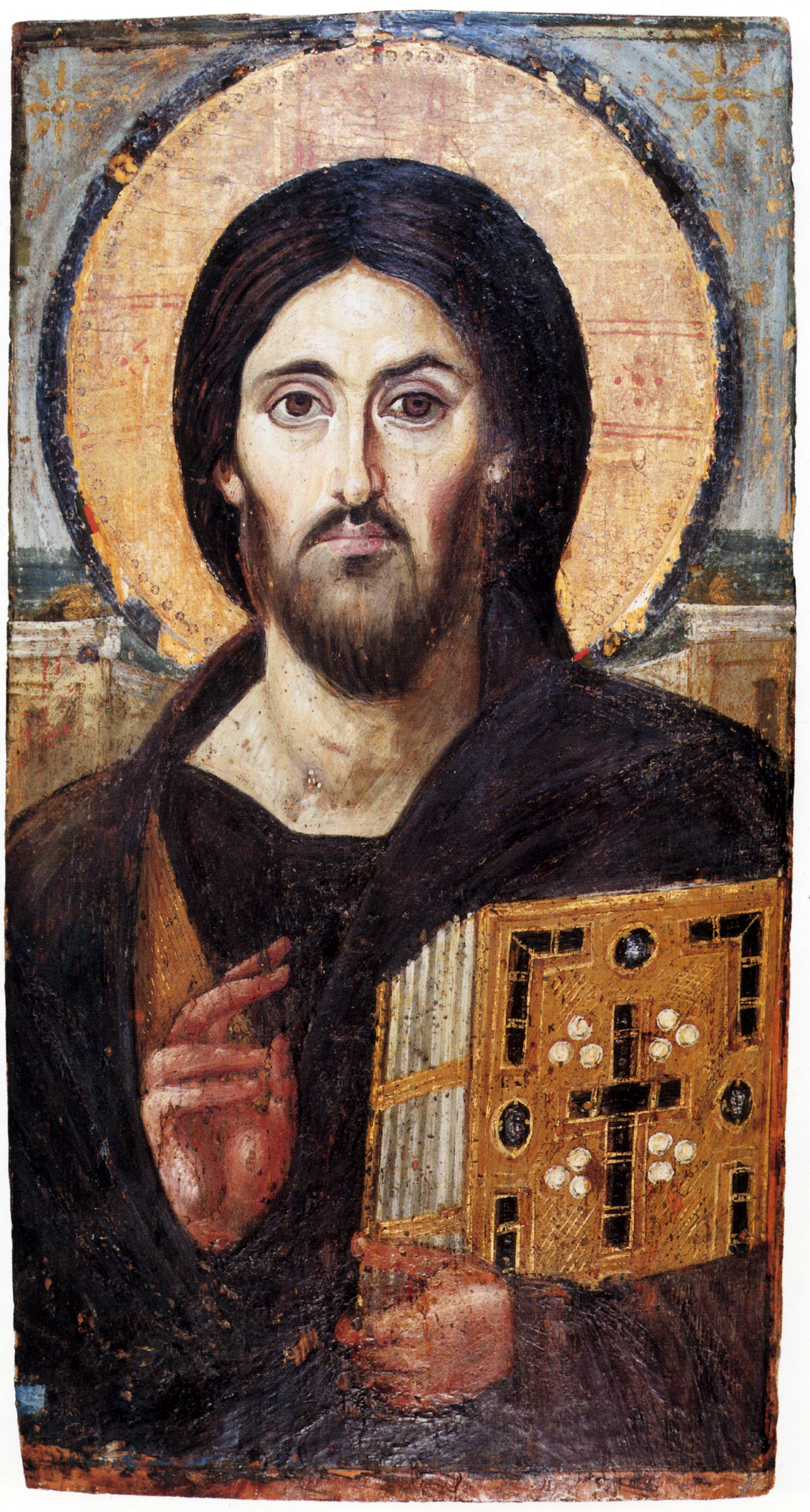
Byzantine icon, 6th century

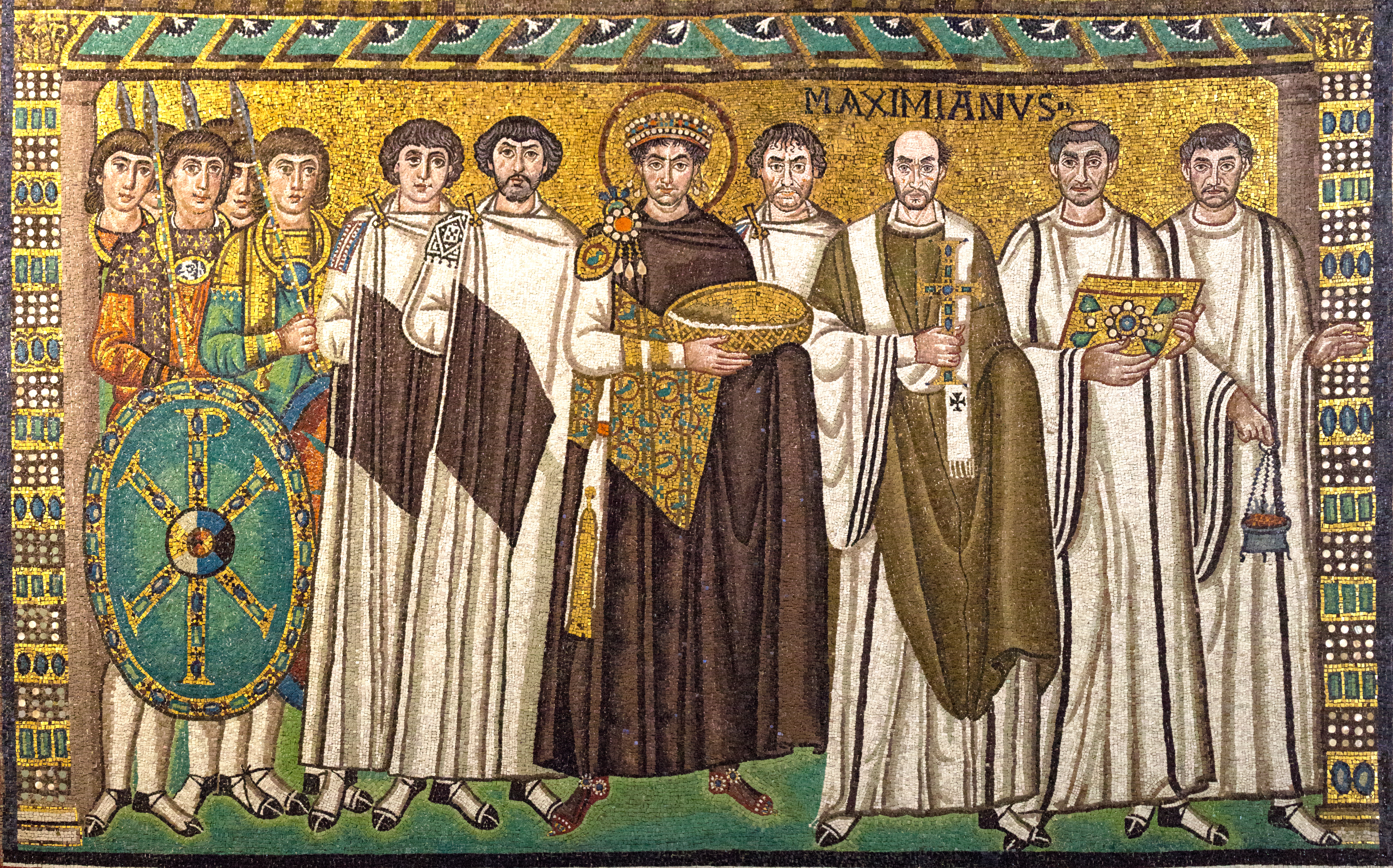
Byzantine art mosaics in Ravenna

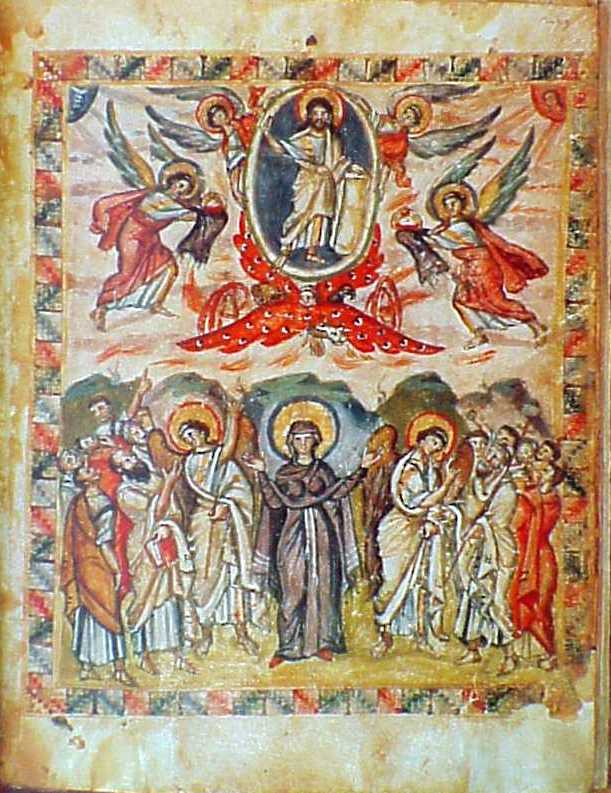
Byzantine, 6th century

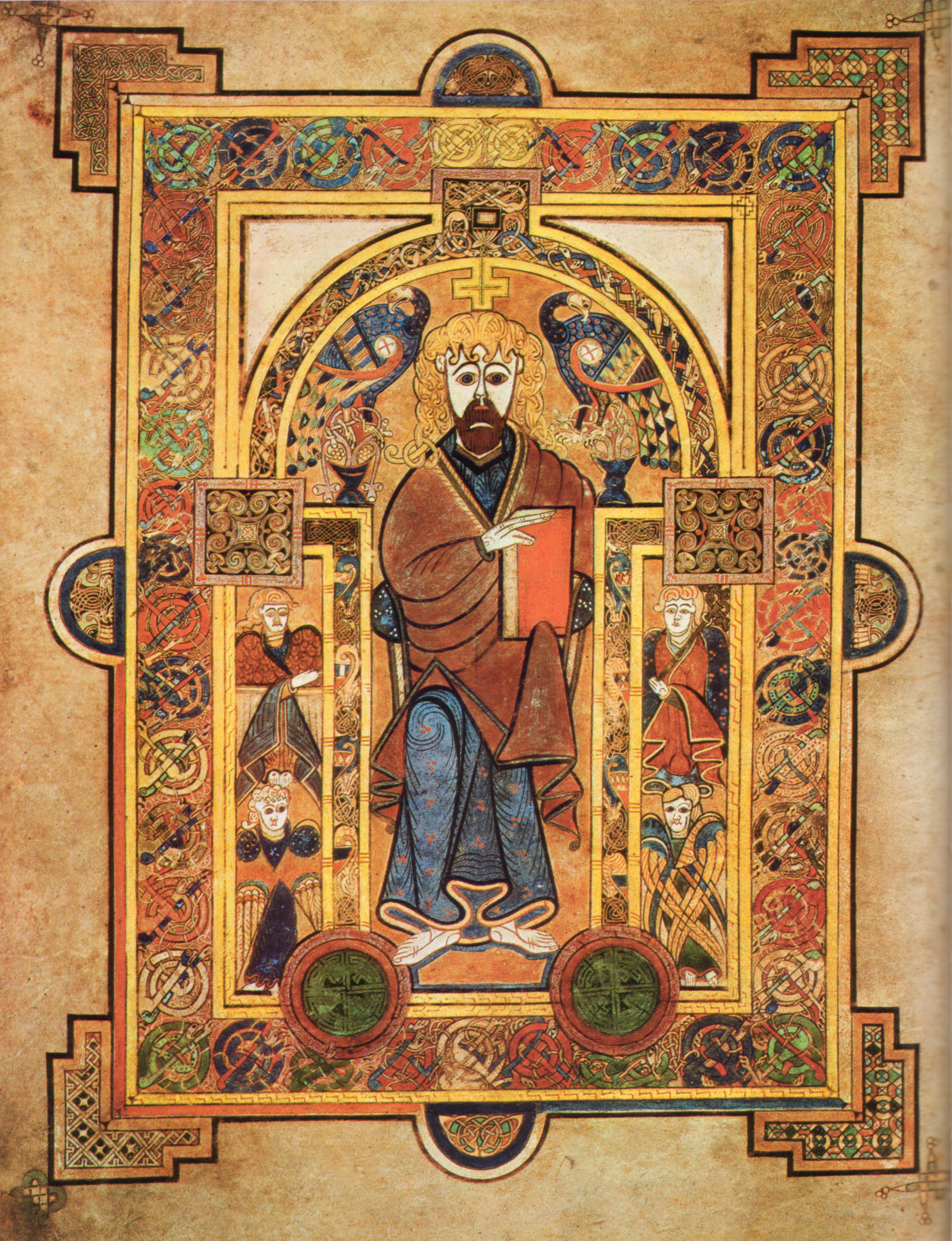
Book of Kells

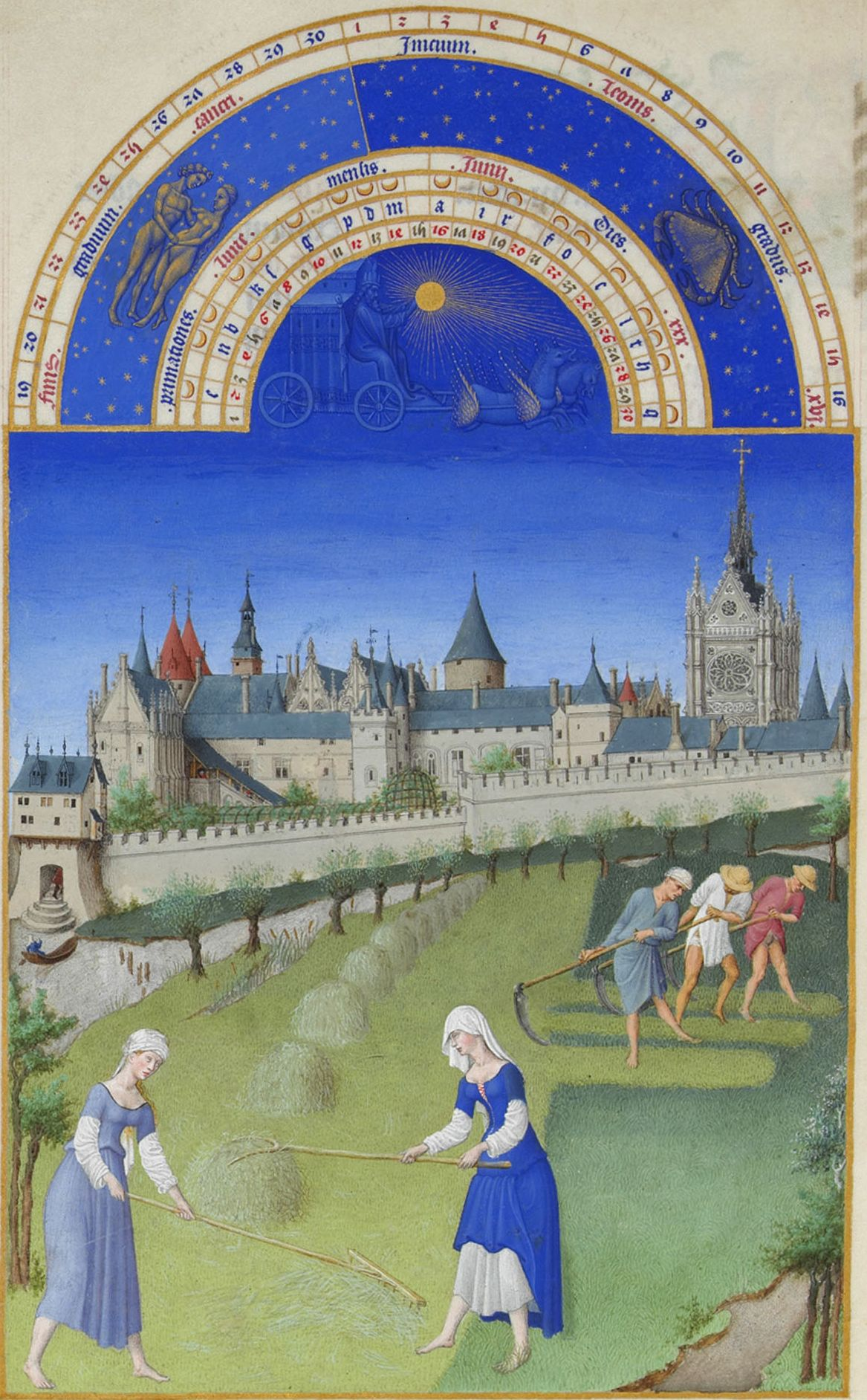
Limbourg Brothers

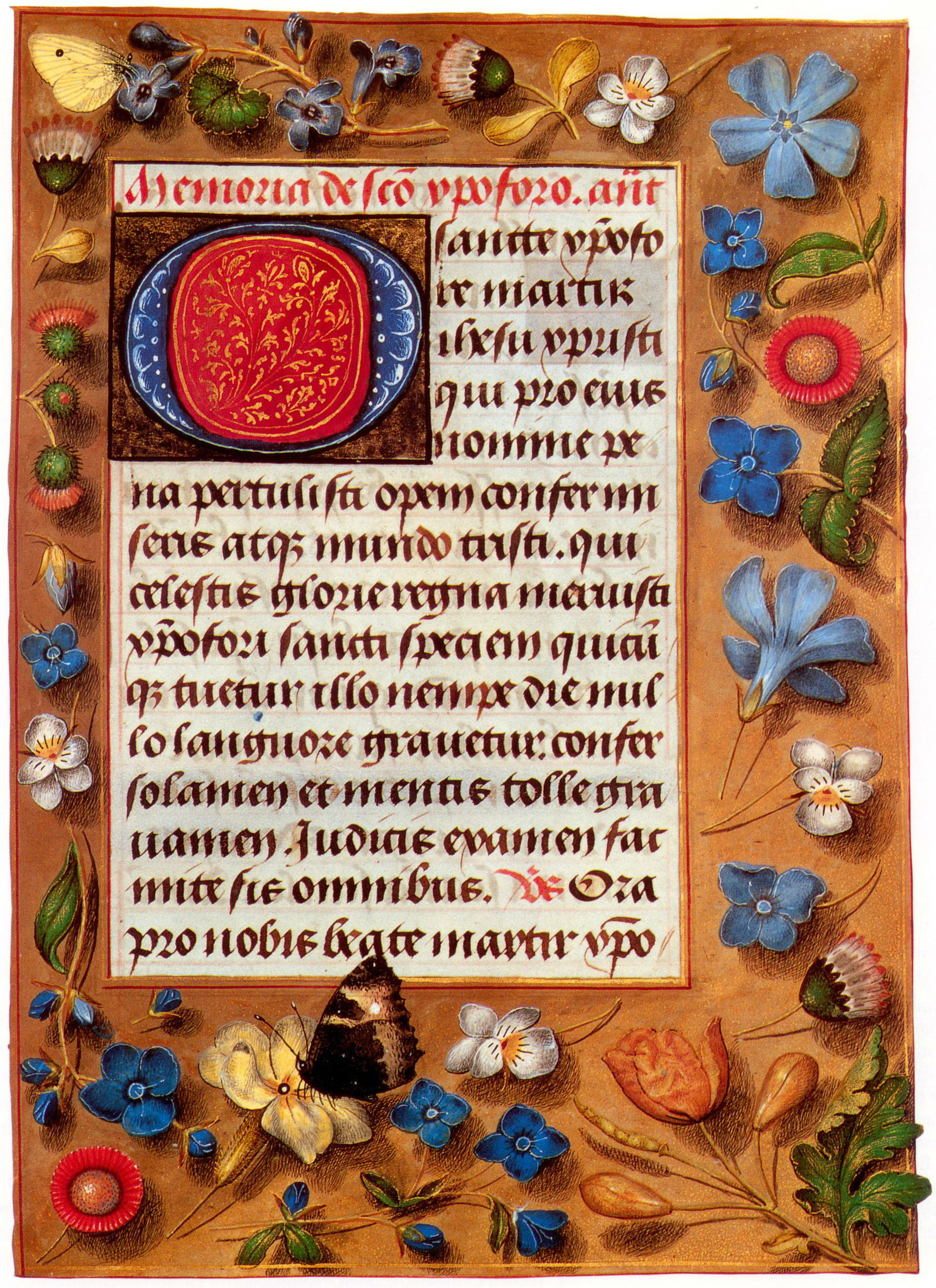
Book of Hours

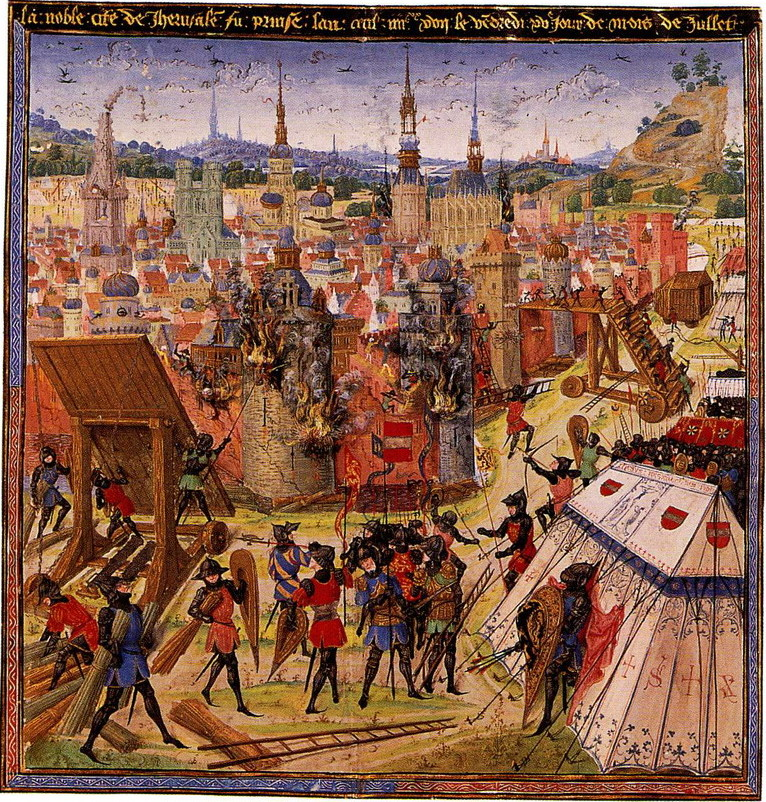
The Capture of Jerusalem during the First Crusade, c. 1099

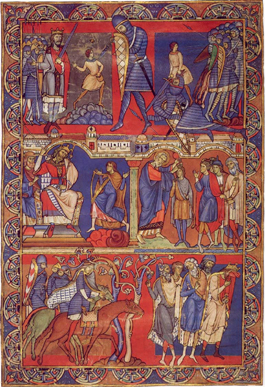
The Morgan Leaf, from the Winchester Bible 1160–75, Scenes from the life of David

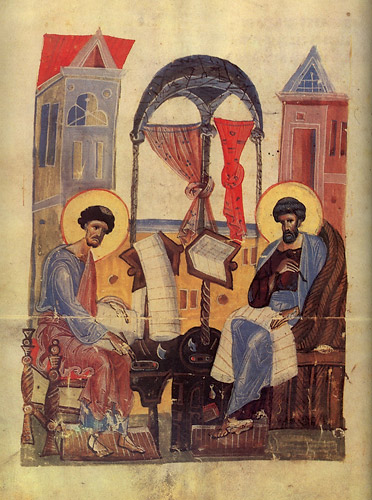
Yaroslavl Gospels c. 1220s

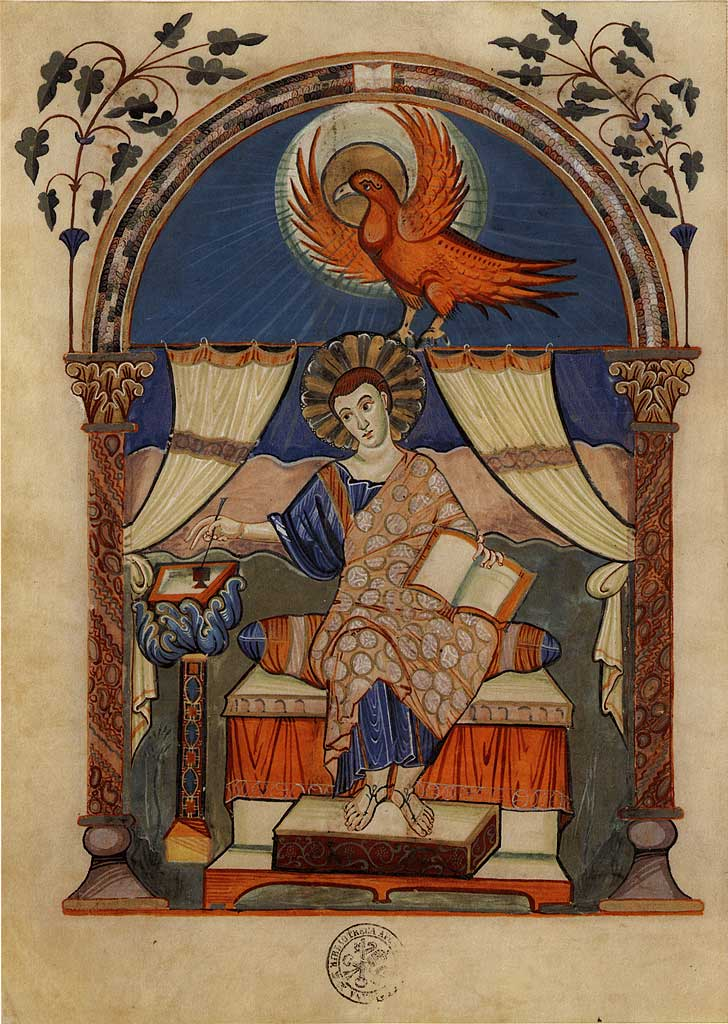
Carolingian

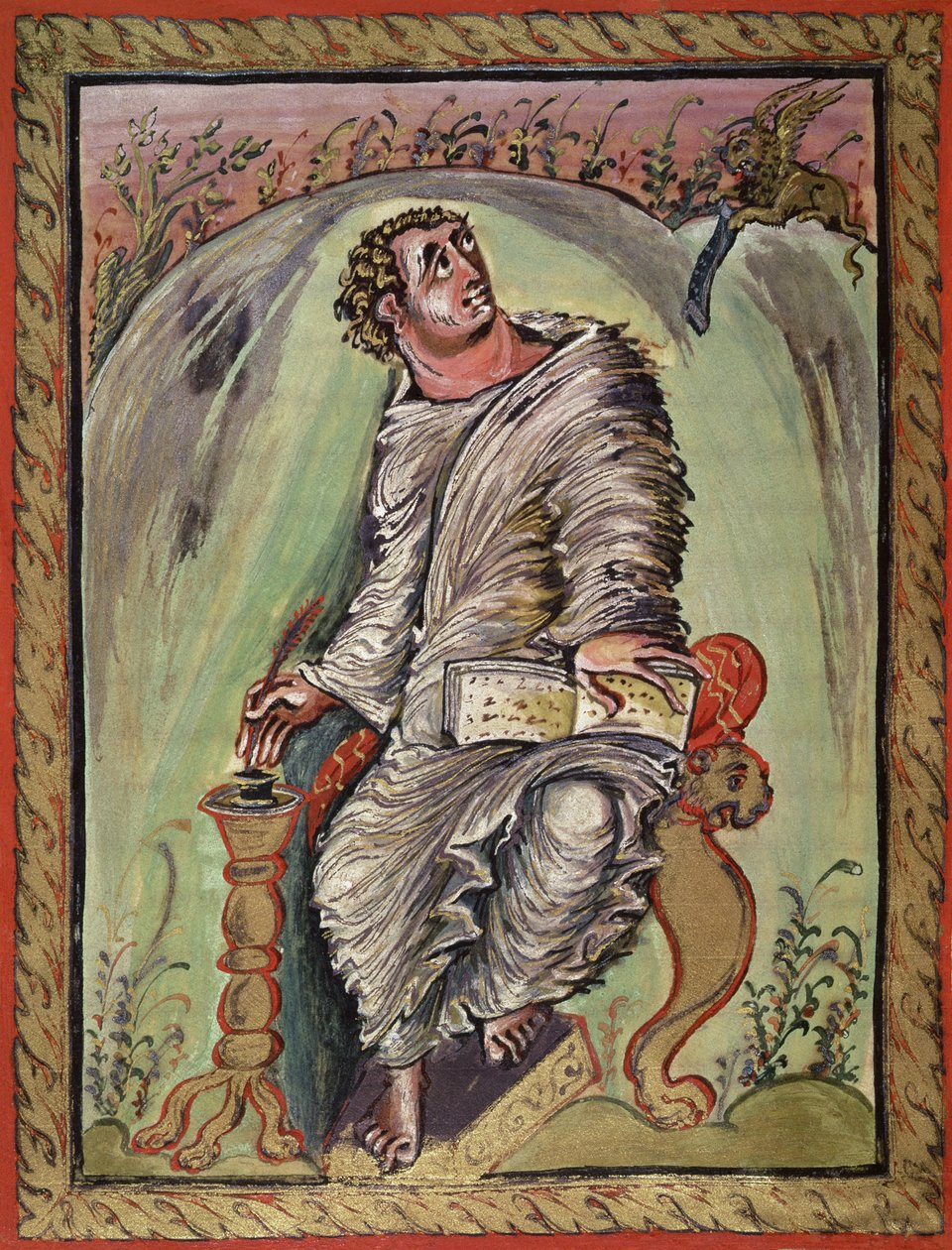
Carolingian Saint Mark

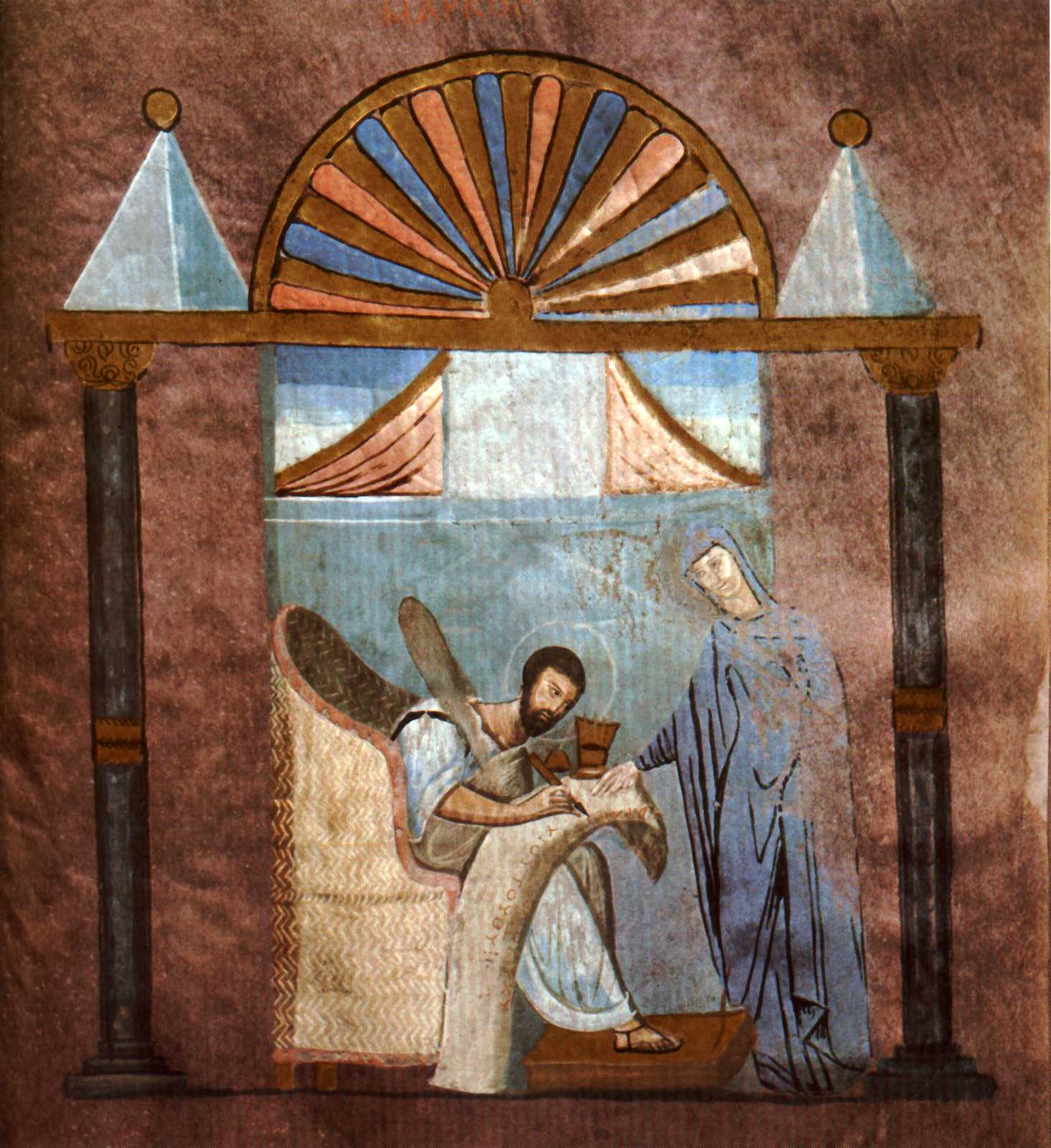
Evangelist portrait

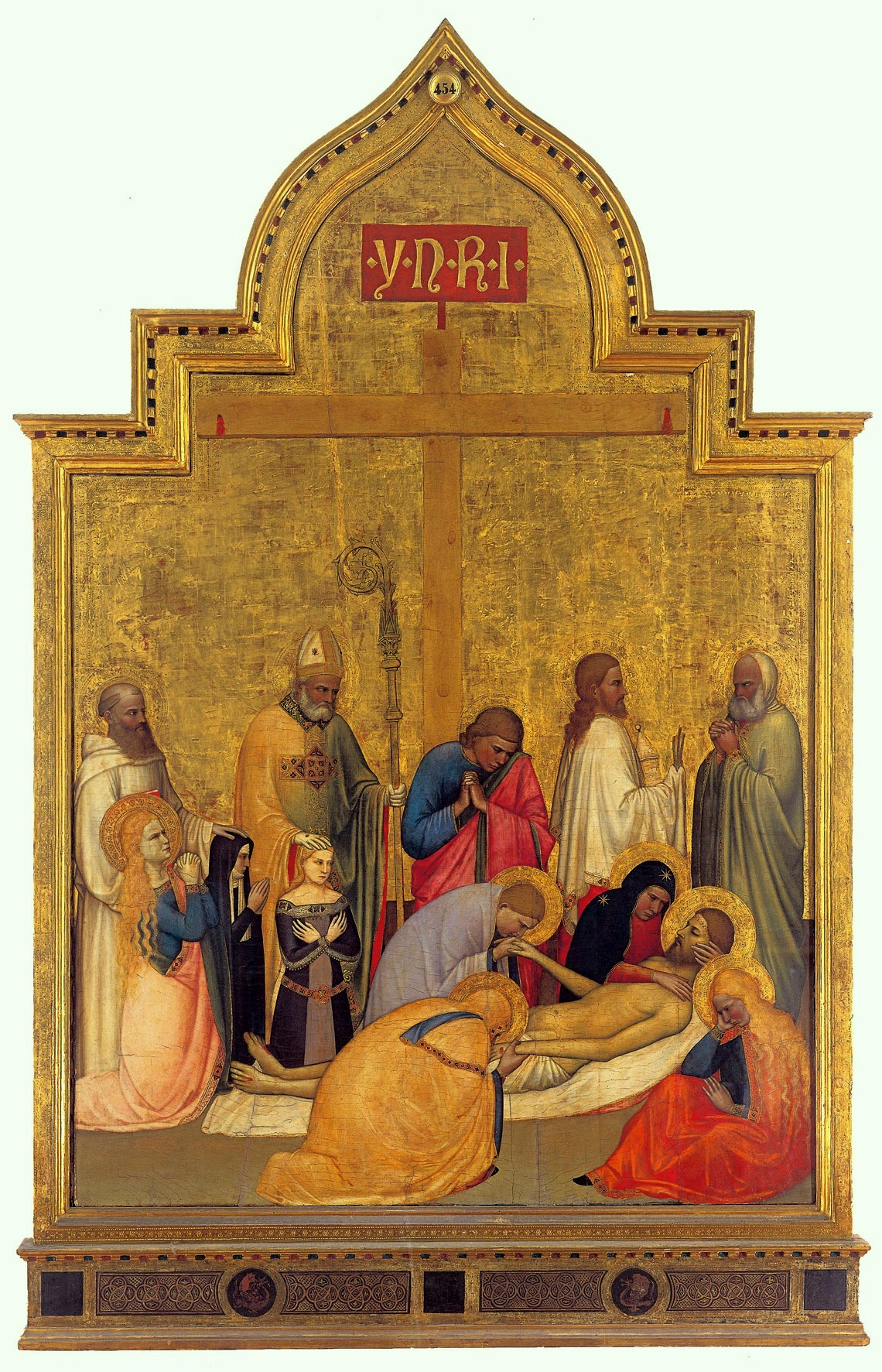
Giottino

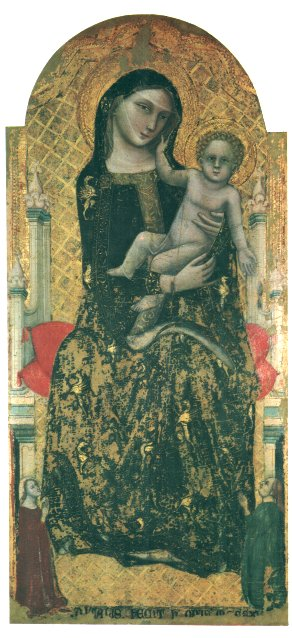
Vitale da Bologna

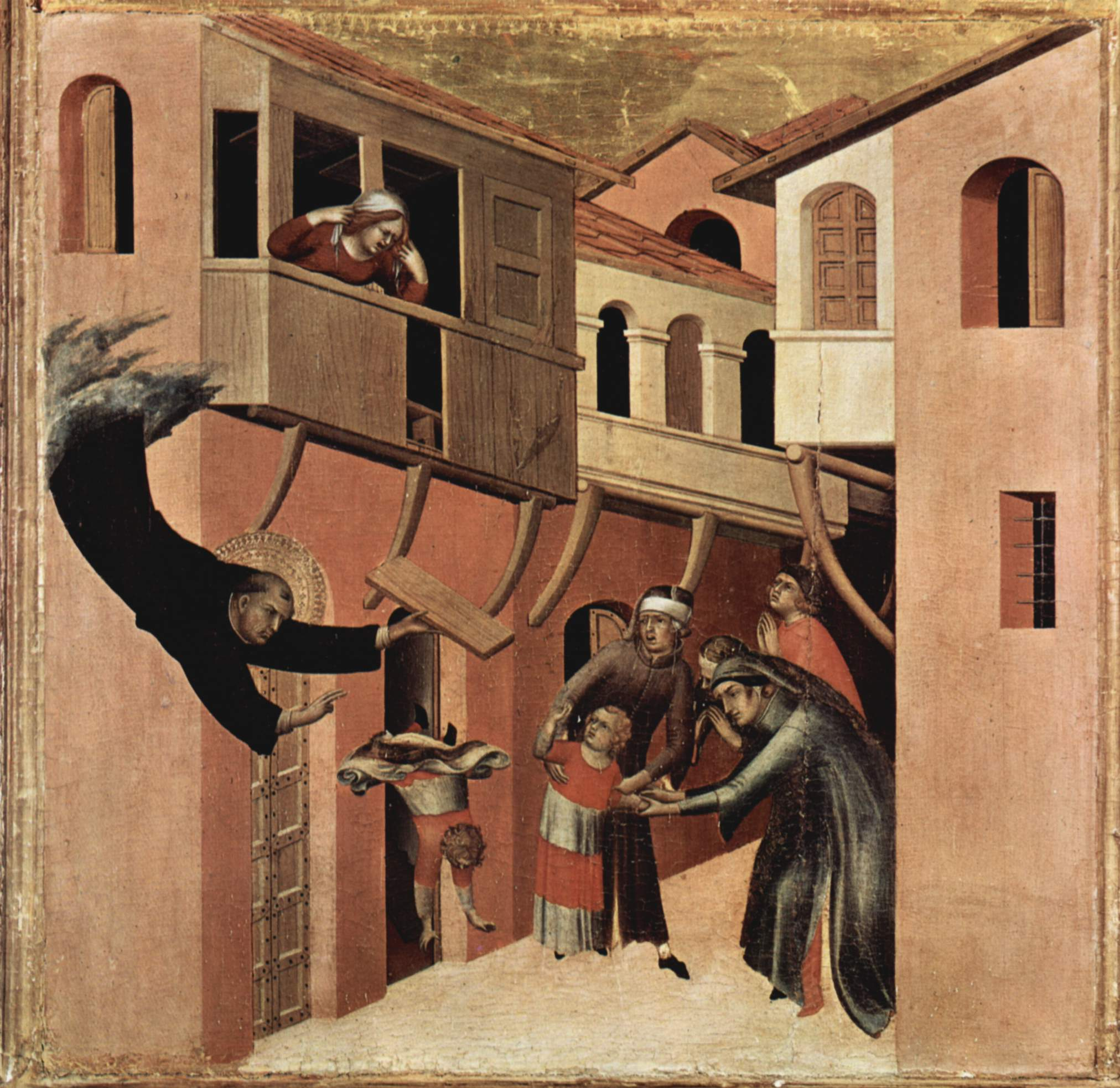
Simone Martini

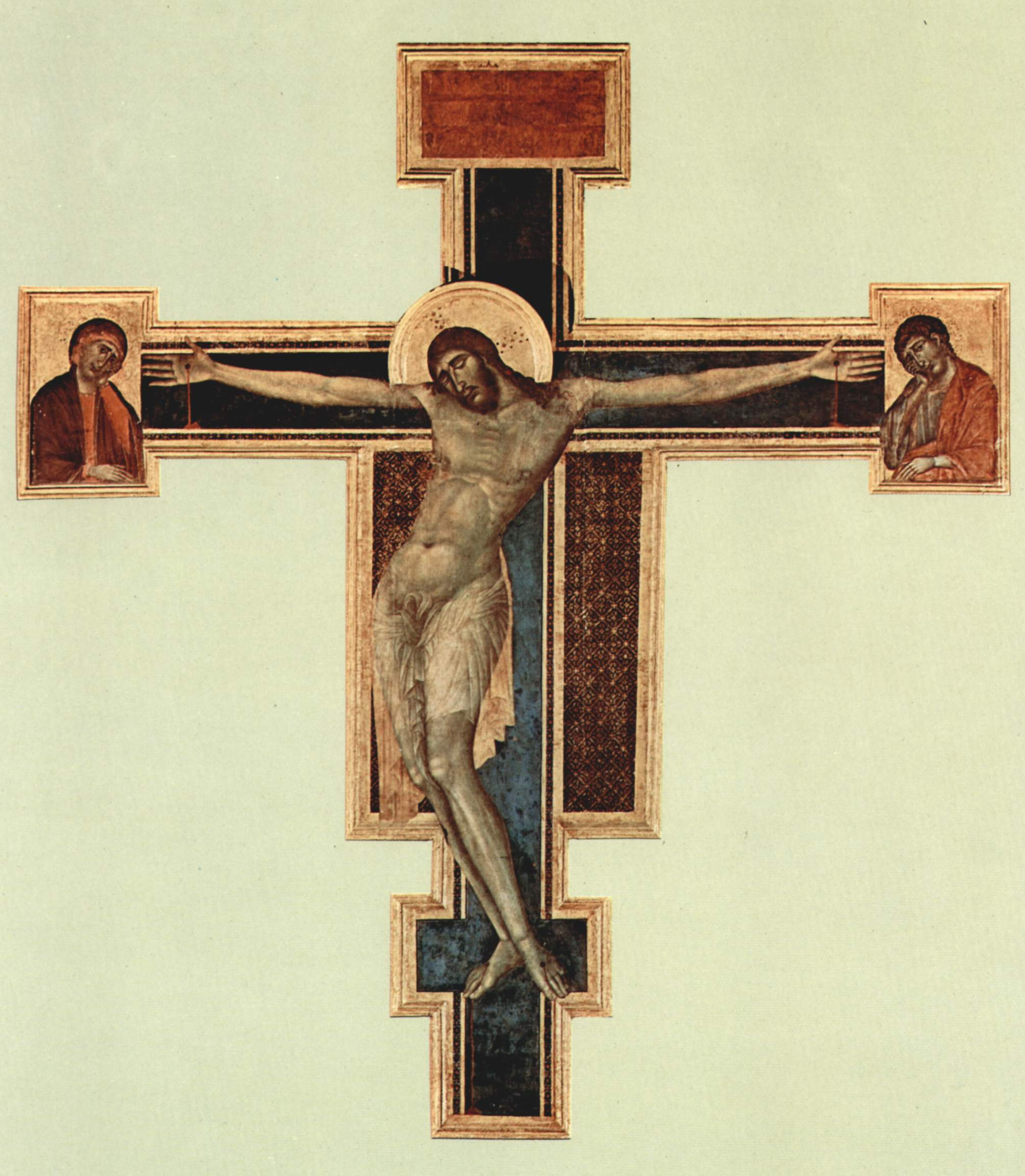
Cimabue

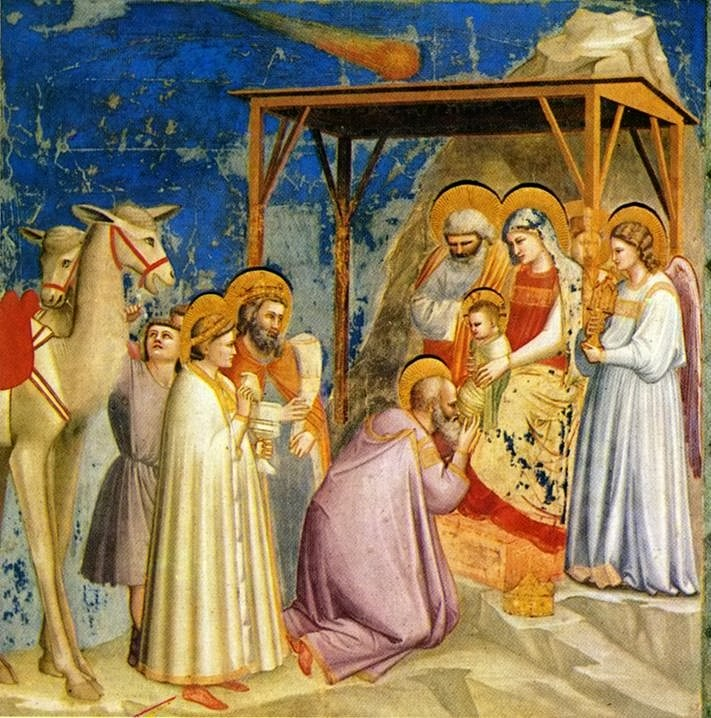
Giotto

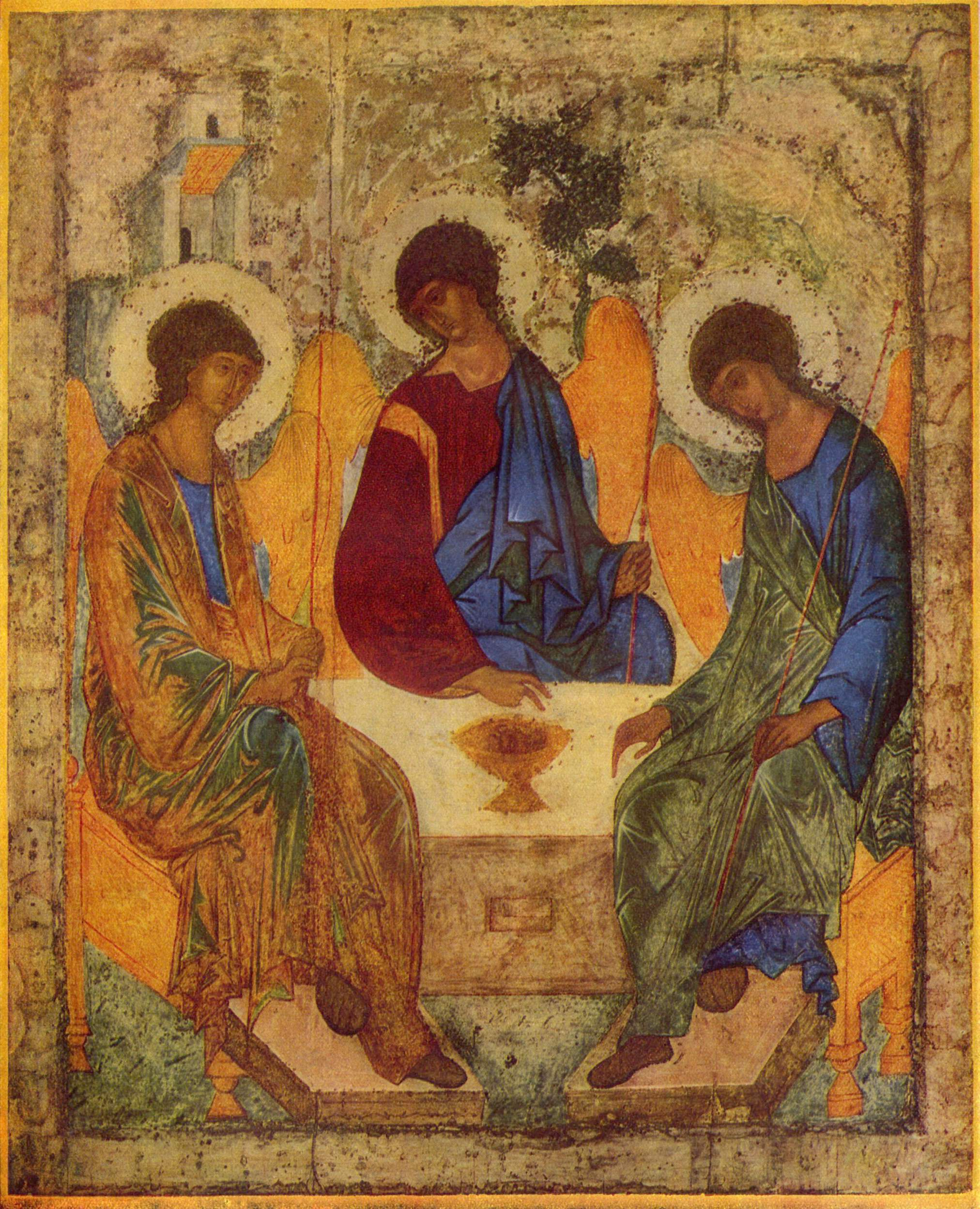
Andrei Rublev

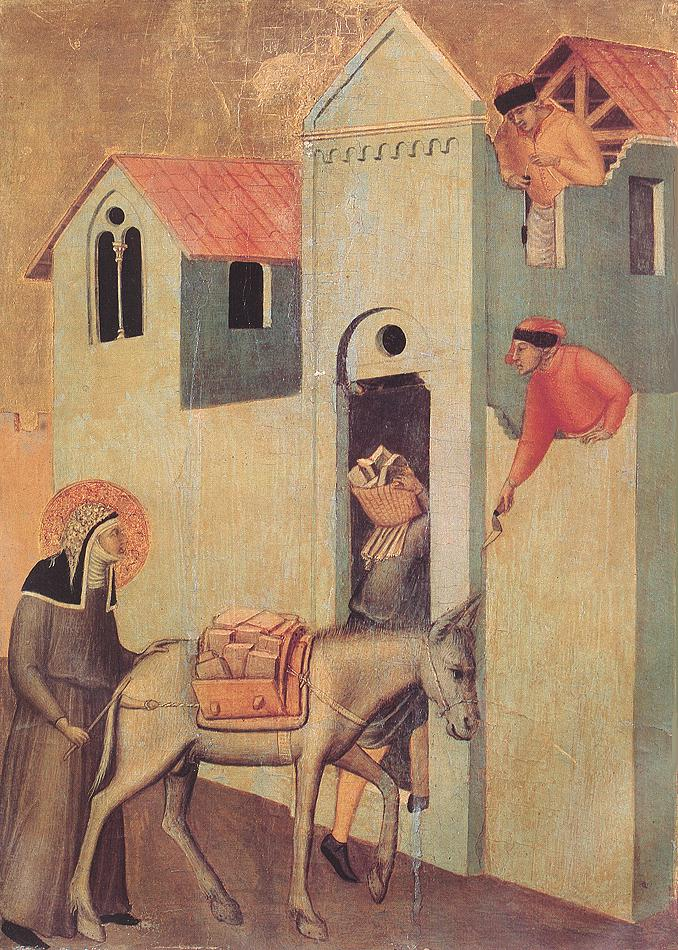
Pietro Lorenzetti

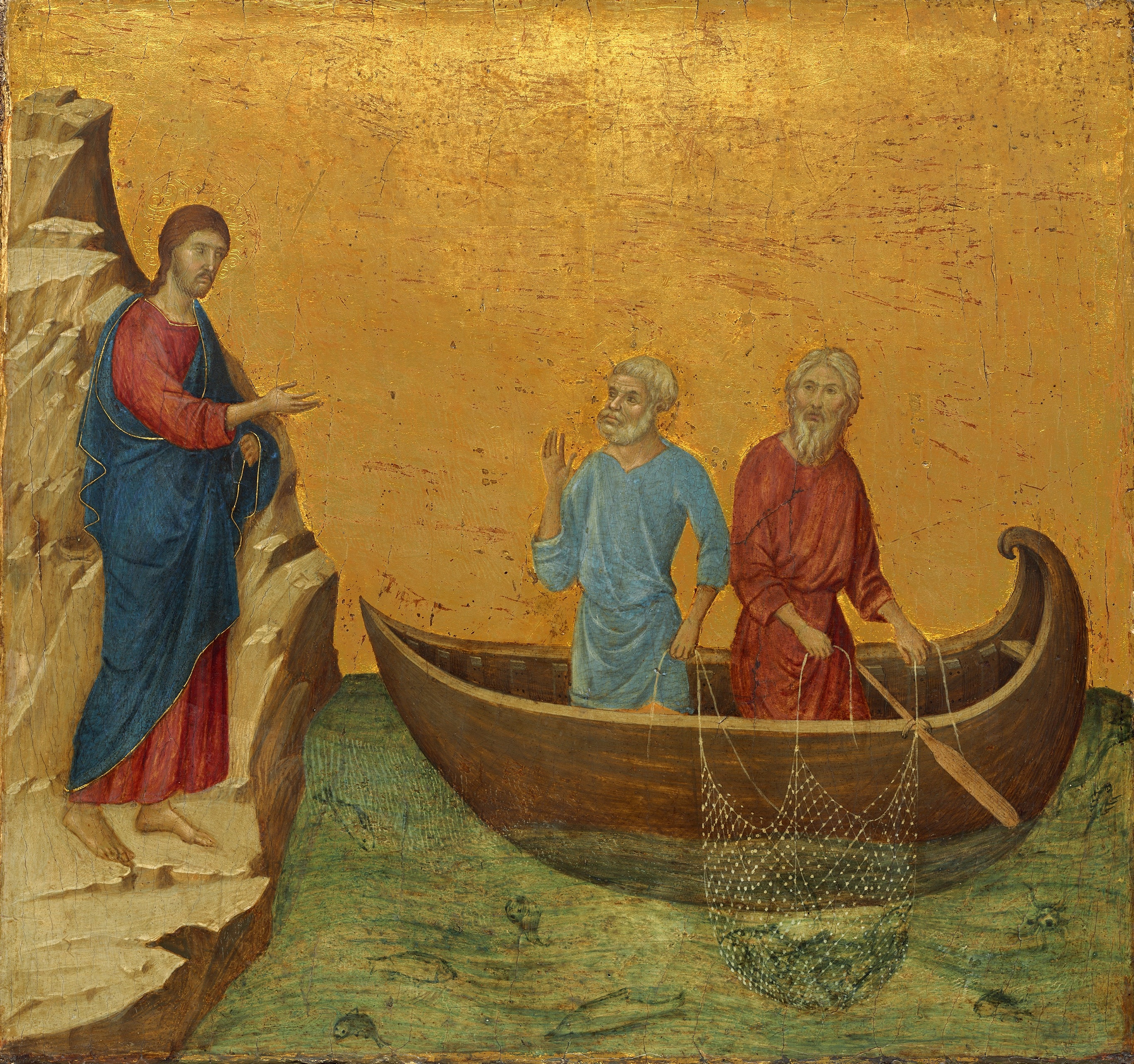
Duccio

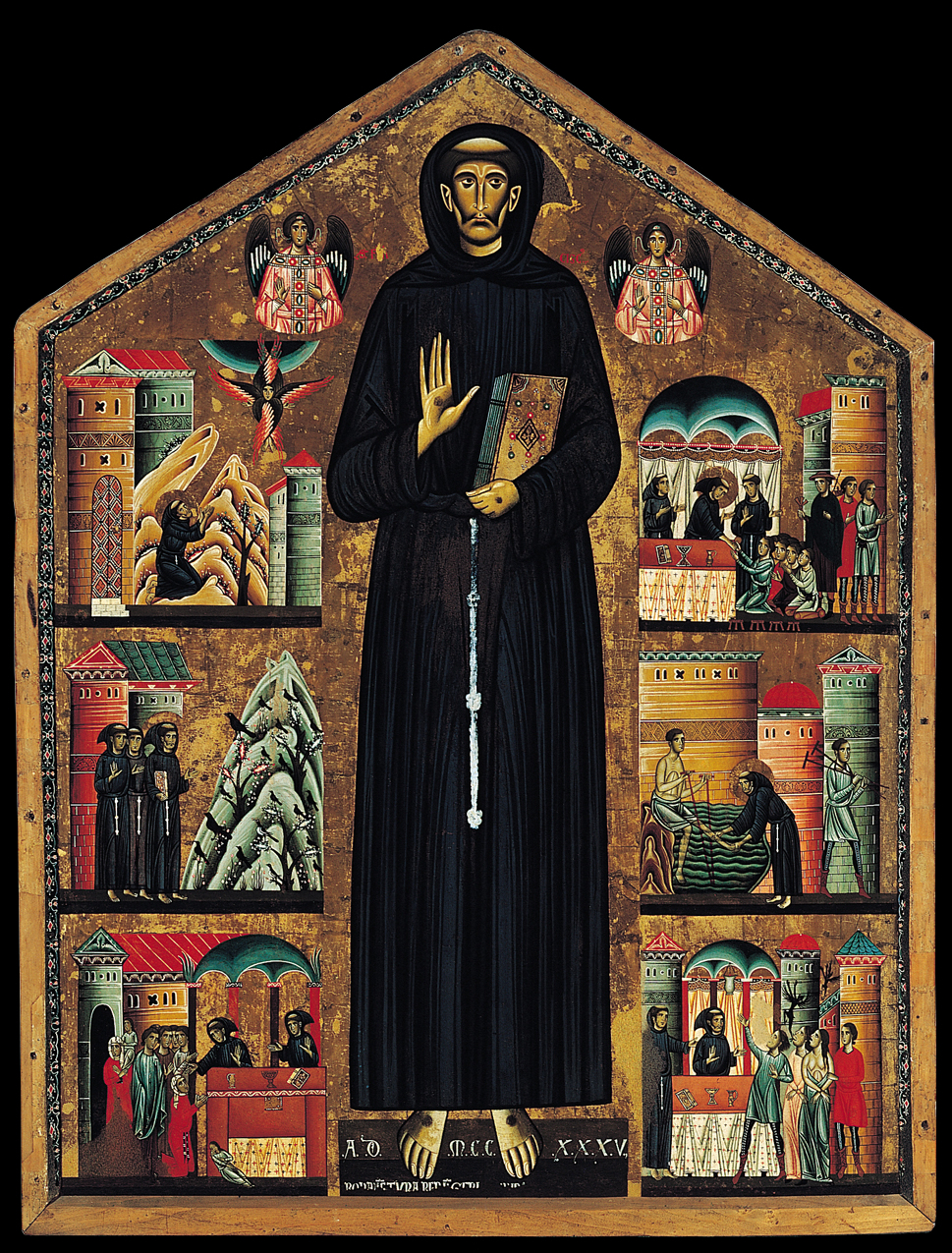
Bonaventura Berlinghieri, St Francis of Assisi, 1235

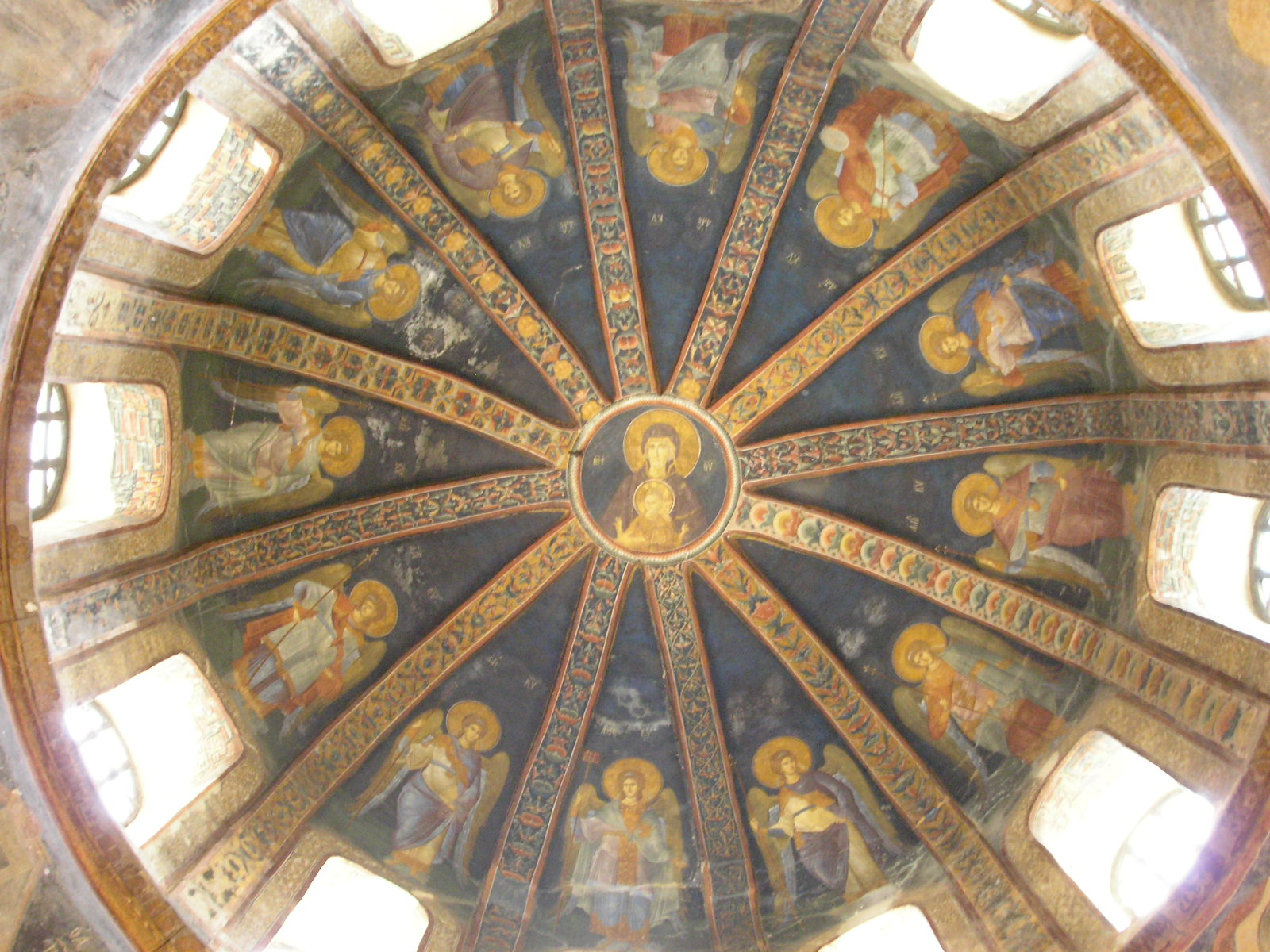
Chora Church

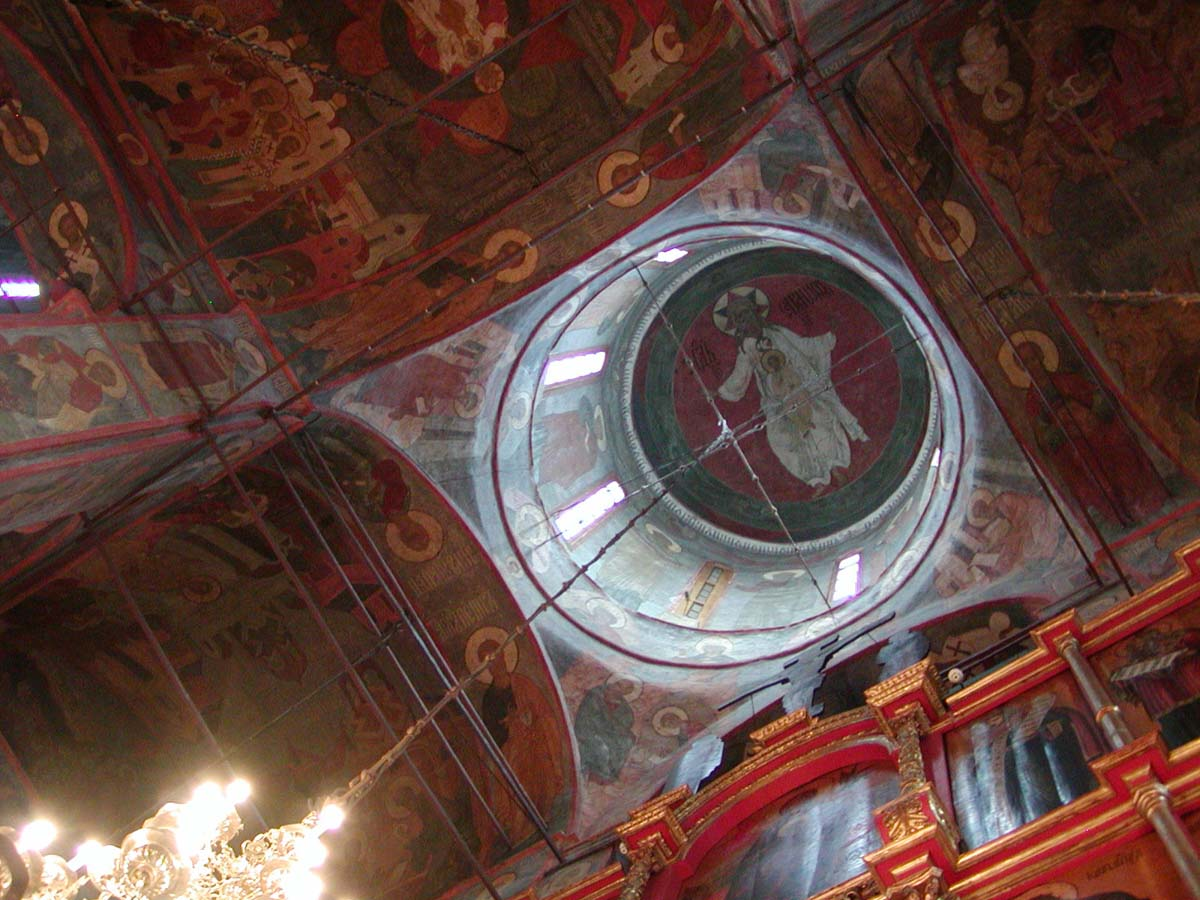
Cathedral of the Archangel

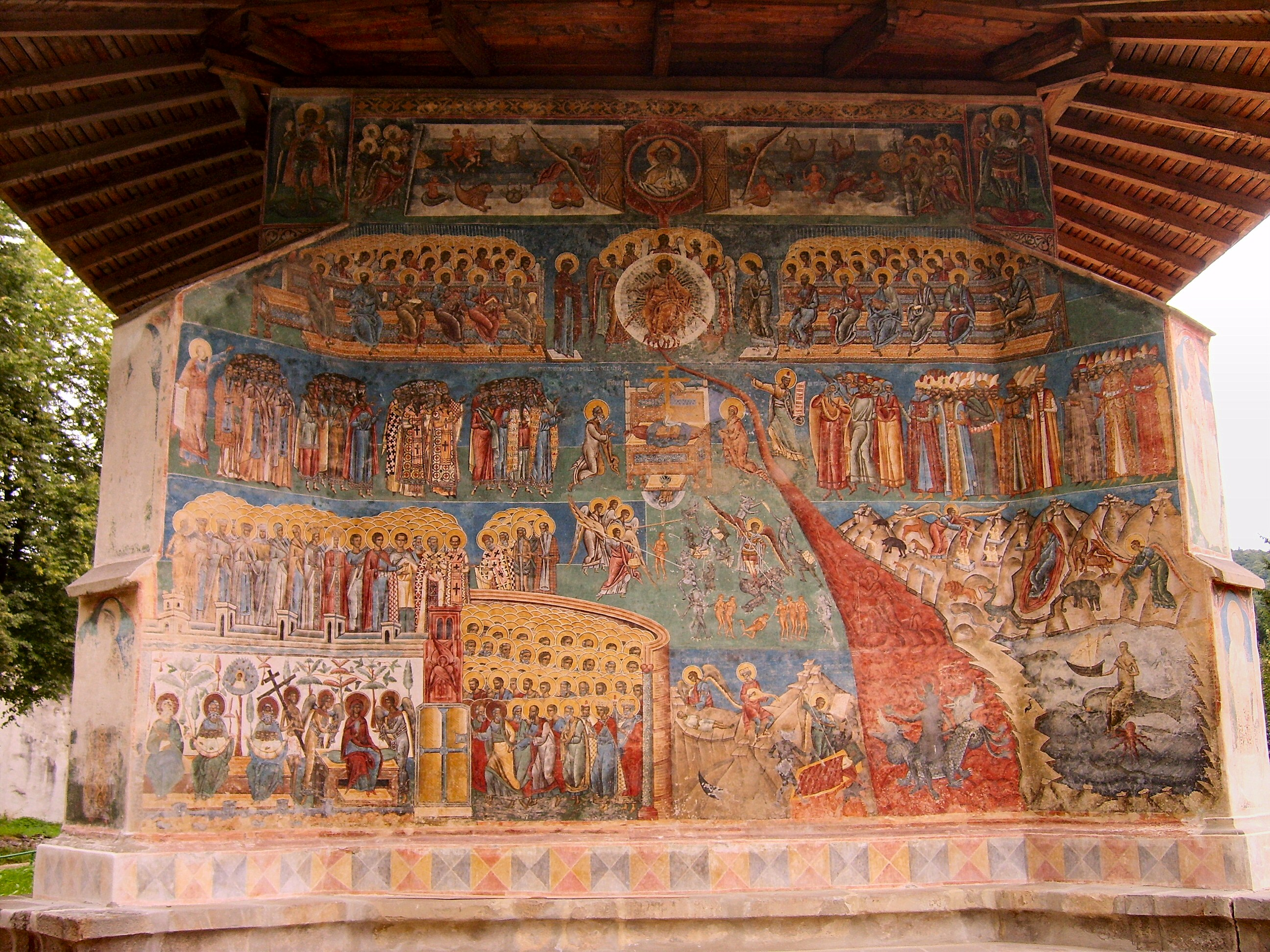
Voronet Monastery

=== Renaissance and Mannerism ===
The Renaissance (French for 'rebirth'), a cultural movement roughly spanning the 14th through the mid-17th century, heralded the study of classical sources, as well as advances in science which profoundly influenced European intellectual and artistic life. In the Low Countries, especially in modern day Flanders, a new way of painting was established in the beginning of the 15th century. In the footsteps of the developments made in the illumination of manuscripts, especially by the Limbourg Brothers, artists became fascinated by the tangible in the visible world and began representing objects in an extremely naturalistic way. The adoption of oil painting whose invention was traditionally, but erroneously, credited to Jan van Eyck, made possible a new verisimilitude in depicting this naturalism. The medium of oil paint was already present in the work of Melchior Broederlam, but painters like Jan van Eyck and Robert Campin brought its use to new heights and employed it to represent the naturalism they were aiming for. With this new medium the painters of this period were capable of creating richer colors with a deep intense tonality. The illusion of glowing light with a porcelain-like finish characterized Early Netherlandish painting and was a major difference to the matte surface of tempera paint used in Italy. Unlike the Italians, whose work drew heavily from the art of Ancient Greece and Rome, the northerners retained a stylistic residue of the sculpture and illuminated manuscripts of the Middle Ages (especially its naturalism). The most important artist of this time was Jan van Eyck, whose work ranks among the finest made by artists who are now known as Early Netherlandish painters or Flemish Primitives (since most artists were active in cities in modern day Flanders). The first painter of this period was the Master of Flémalle, nowadays identified as Robert Campin, whose work follows the art of the International Gothic. Another important painter of this period was Rogier van der Weyden, whose compositions stressed human emotion and drama, demonstrated for instance in his Descent from the Cross, which ranks among the most famous works of the 15th century and was the most influential Netherlandish painting of Christ's crucifixion. Other important artists from this period are Hugo van der Goes (whose work was highly influential in Italy), Dieric Bouts (who was among the first northern painters to demonstrate the use of a single vanishing point), Petrus Christus, Hans Memling and Gerard David.

In Italy, the art of Classical antiquity inspired a style of painting that emphasized the ideal. Artists such as Paolo Uccello, Masaccio, Fra Angelico, Piero della Francesca, Andrea Mantegna, Filippo Lippi, Sandro Botticelli, Leonardo da Vinci, Michelangelo Buonarroti, and Raphael took painting to a higher level through the use of perspective, the study of human anatomy and proportion, and through their development of an unprecedented refinement in drawing and painting techniques. A somewhat more naturalistic style emerged in Venice. Painters of the Venetian school, such as Giovanni Bellini, Giorgione, Titian, Tintoretto, and Veronese, were less concerned with precision in their drawing than with the richness of color and unity of effect that could be achieved by a more spontaneous approach to painting.

Flemish, Dutch and German painters of the Renaissance such as Hans Holbein the Younger, Albrecht Dürer, Lucas Cranach, Matthias Grünewald, Hieronymus Bosch, and Pieter Bruegel represent a different approach from their Italian colleagues, one that is more realistic and less idealized. Genre painting became a popular idiom amongst the Northern painters like Pieter Bruegel.

The French tradition of International Gothic, will develop a new style by integrating the strong chromatic tones of Gothic with the Italian perspective and volumes of the Quattrocento, as well as the naturalistic innovations of the Flemish primitives, called the École de Tours. Its main representatives are Jean Fouquet, Barthélemy d'Eyck from the Netherlands, Jean and François Clouet, Jean Perreal, Nicolas Froment and the École de Fontainebleau.

Renaissance painting reflects the revolution of ideas and science (astronomy, geography) that occurred in this period, the Reformation, and the invention of the printing press. Dürer, considered one of the greatest of printmakers, states that painters are not mere artisans but thinkers as well. With the development of easel painting in the Renaissance, painting gained independence from architecture. Easel paintings—movable pictures which could be hung easily on walls—became a popular alternative to paintings fixed to furniture, walls or other structures. Following centuries dominated by religious imagery, secular subject matter slowly returned to Western painting. Artists included visions of the world around them, or the products of their own imaginations in their paintings. Those who could afford the expense could become patrons and commission portraits of themselves or their family.

The High Renaissance gave rise to a stylized art known as Mannerism. In place of the balanced compositions and rational approach to perspective that characterized art at the dawn of the 16th century, the Mannerists sought instability, artifice, and doubt. The unperturbed faces and gestures of Piero della Francesca and the calm Virgins of Raphael are replaced by the troubled expressions of Pontormo and the emotional intensity of El Greco. Restless and unstable compositions, often extreme or disjunctive effects of perspective, and stylized poses are characteristic of Italian Mannerists such as Tintoretto, Pontormo, and Bronzino, and appeared later in the work of Northern Mannerists such as Hendrick Goltzius, Bartholomeus Spranger, and Joachim Wtewael.

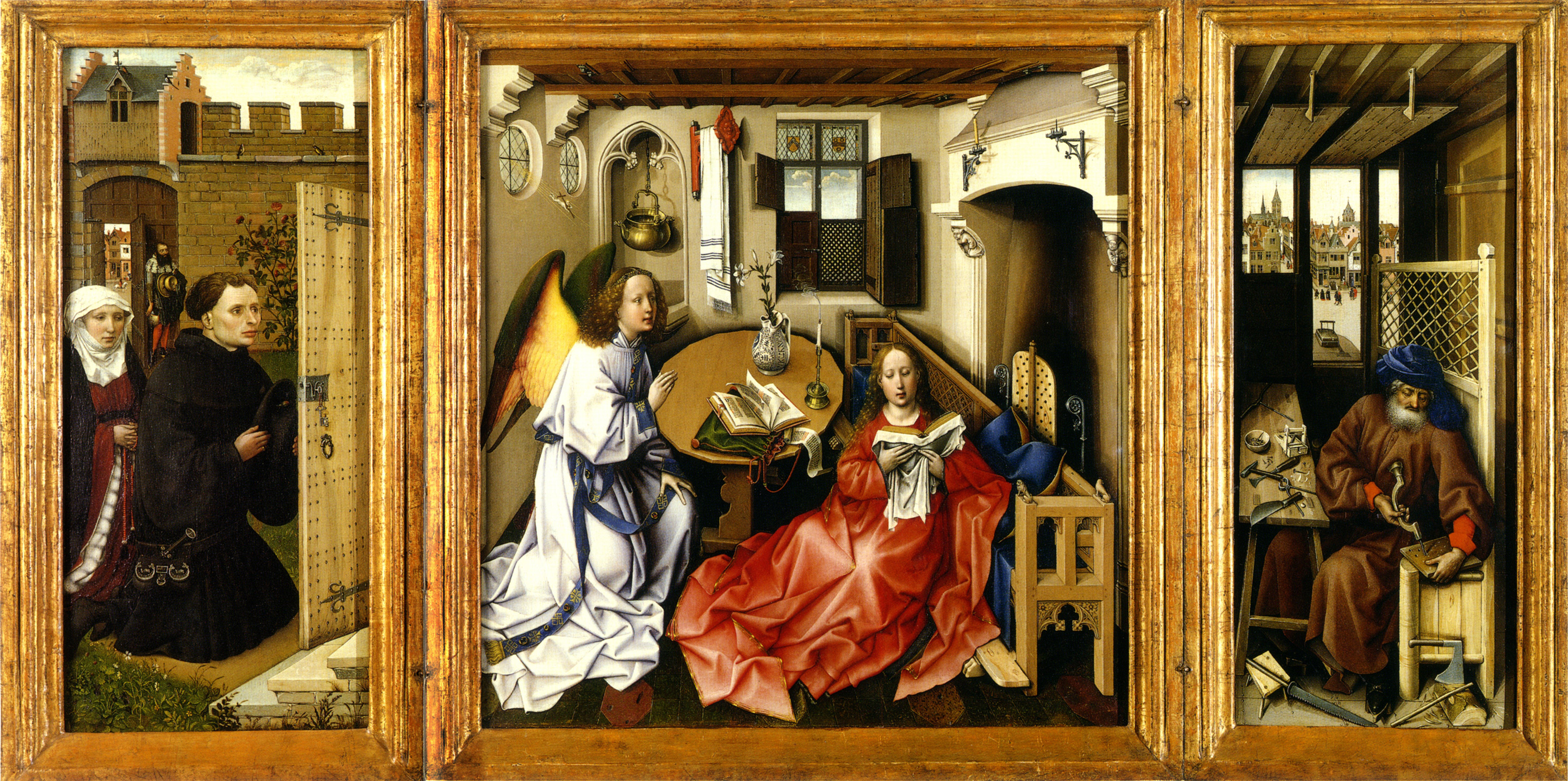
Robert Campin, c. 1425

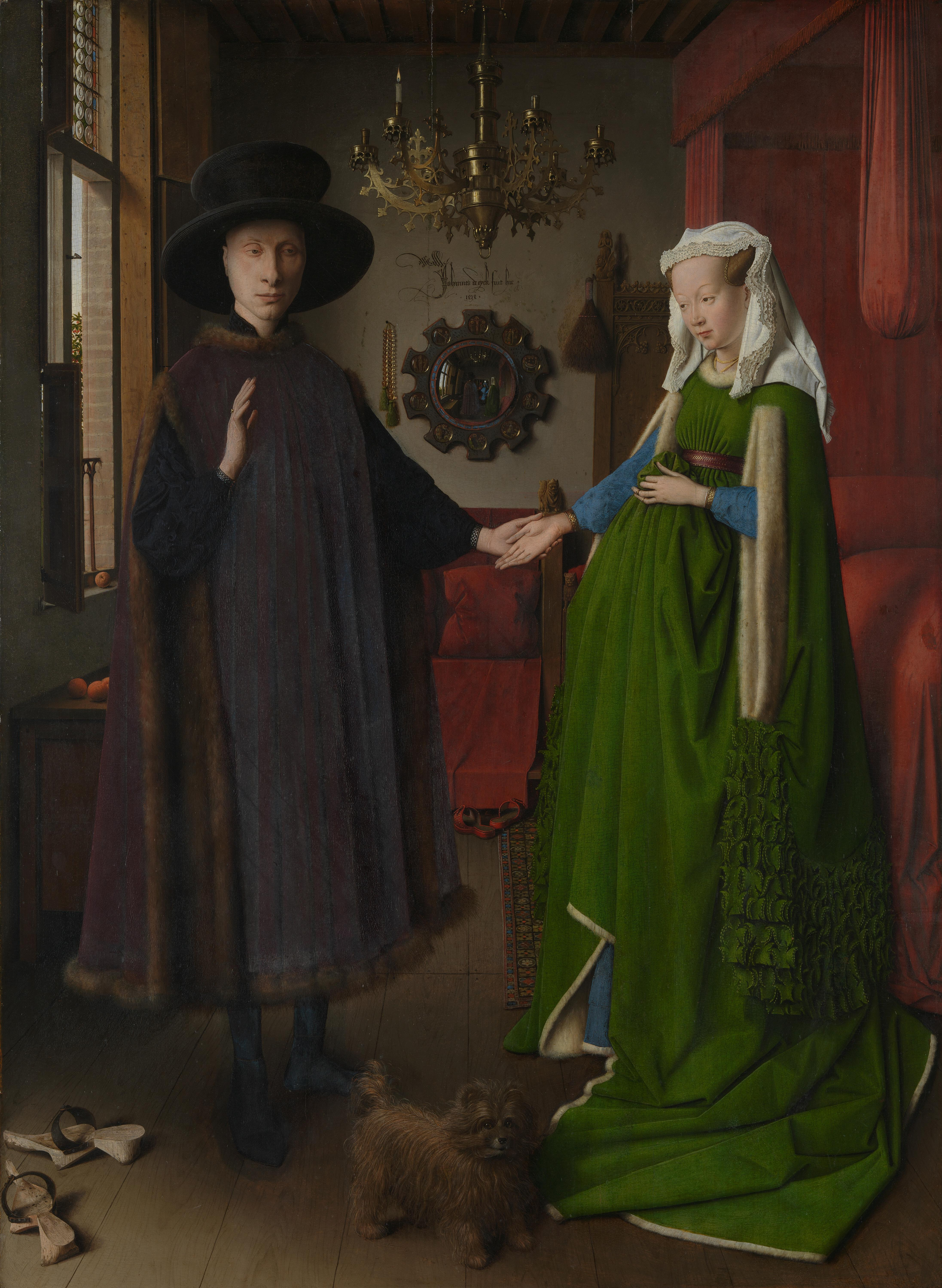
Jan van Eyck, 1434

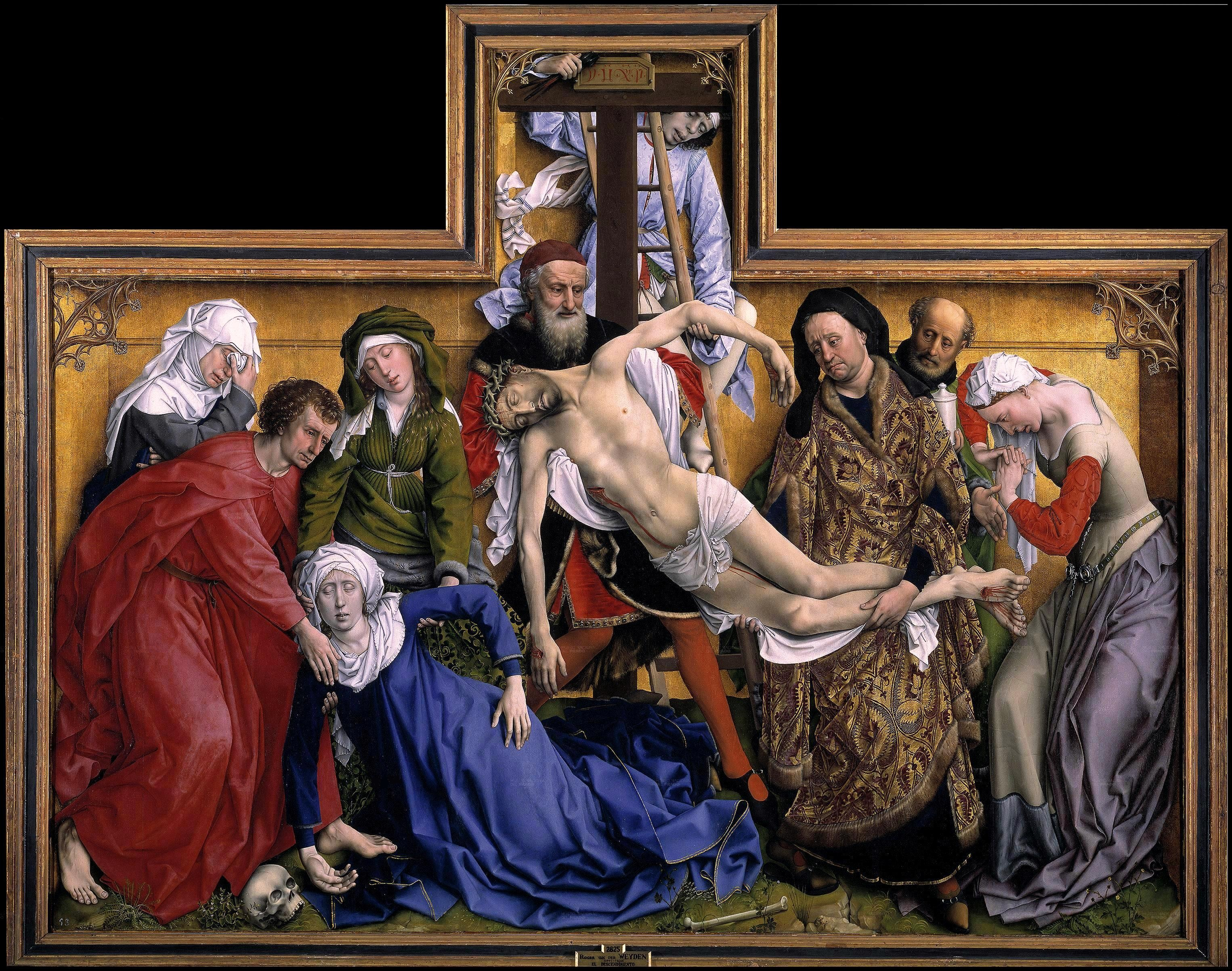
Rogier van der Weyden, c. 1435

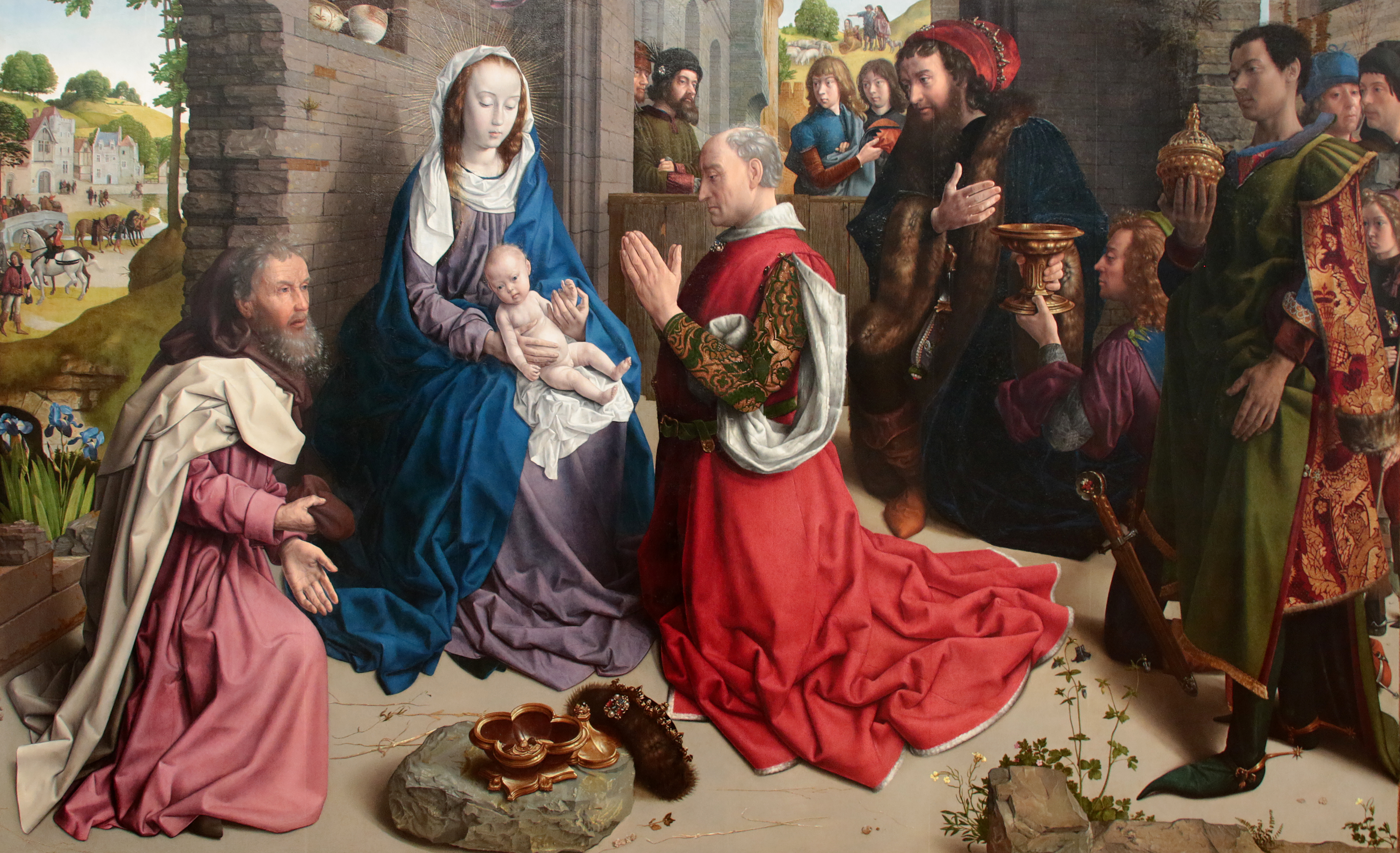
Hugo van der Goes, c. 1470

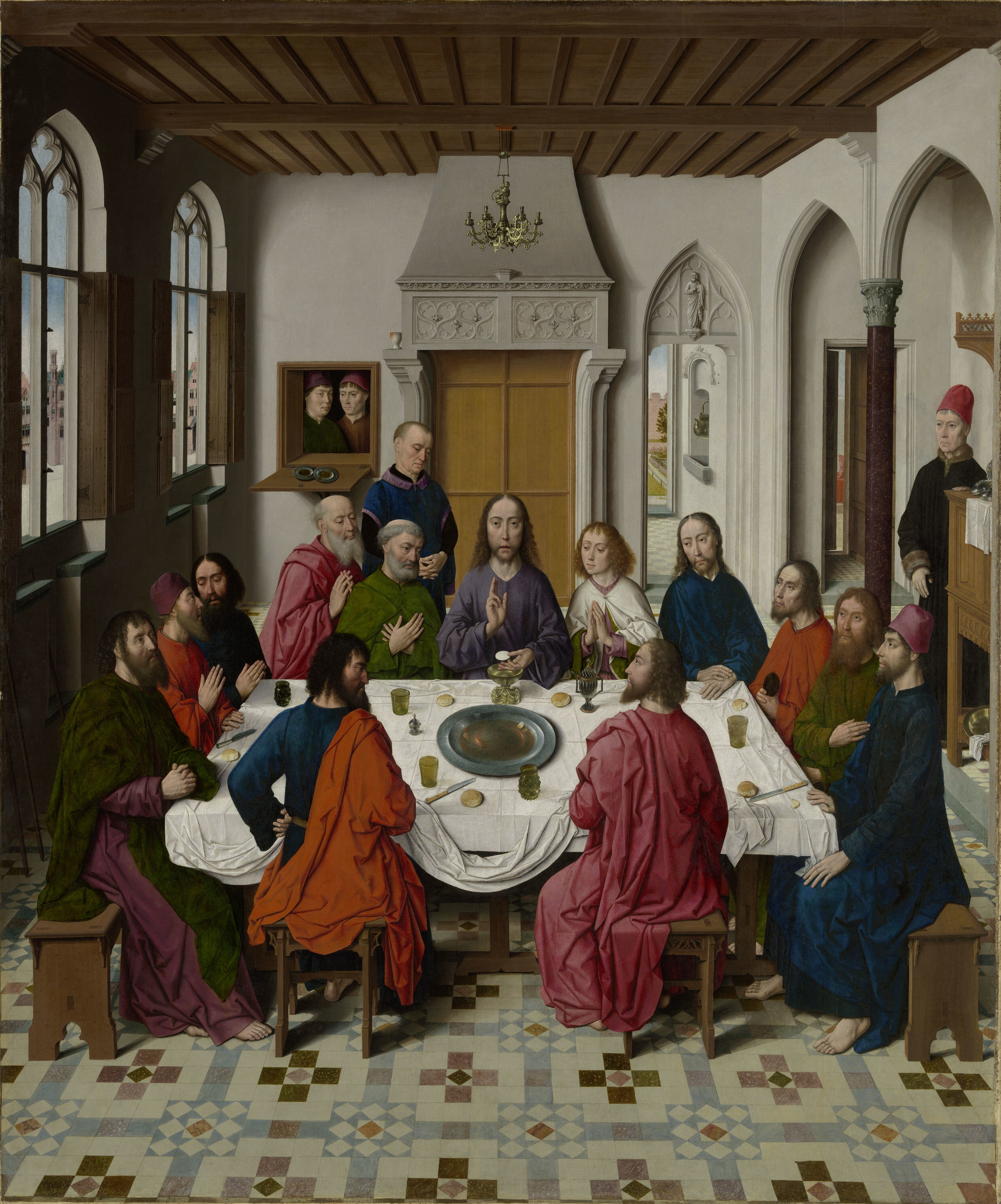
Dieric Bouts, 1464–1467

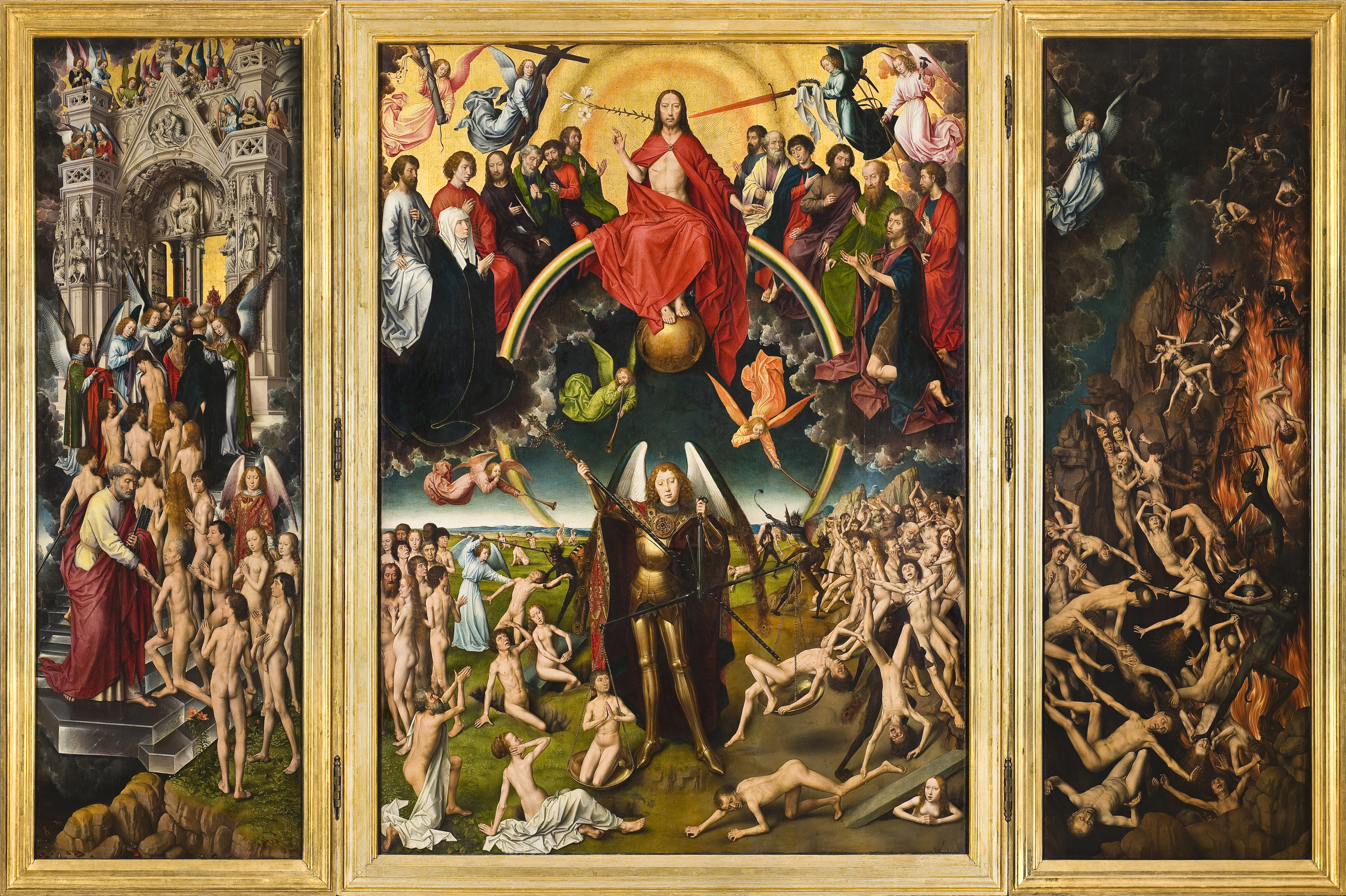
Hans Memling, c. 1466–1473

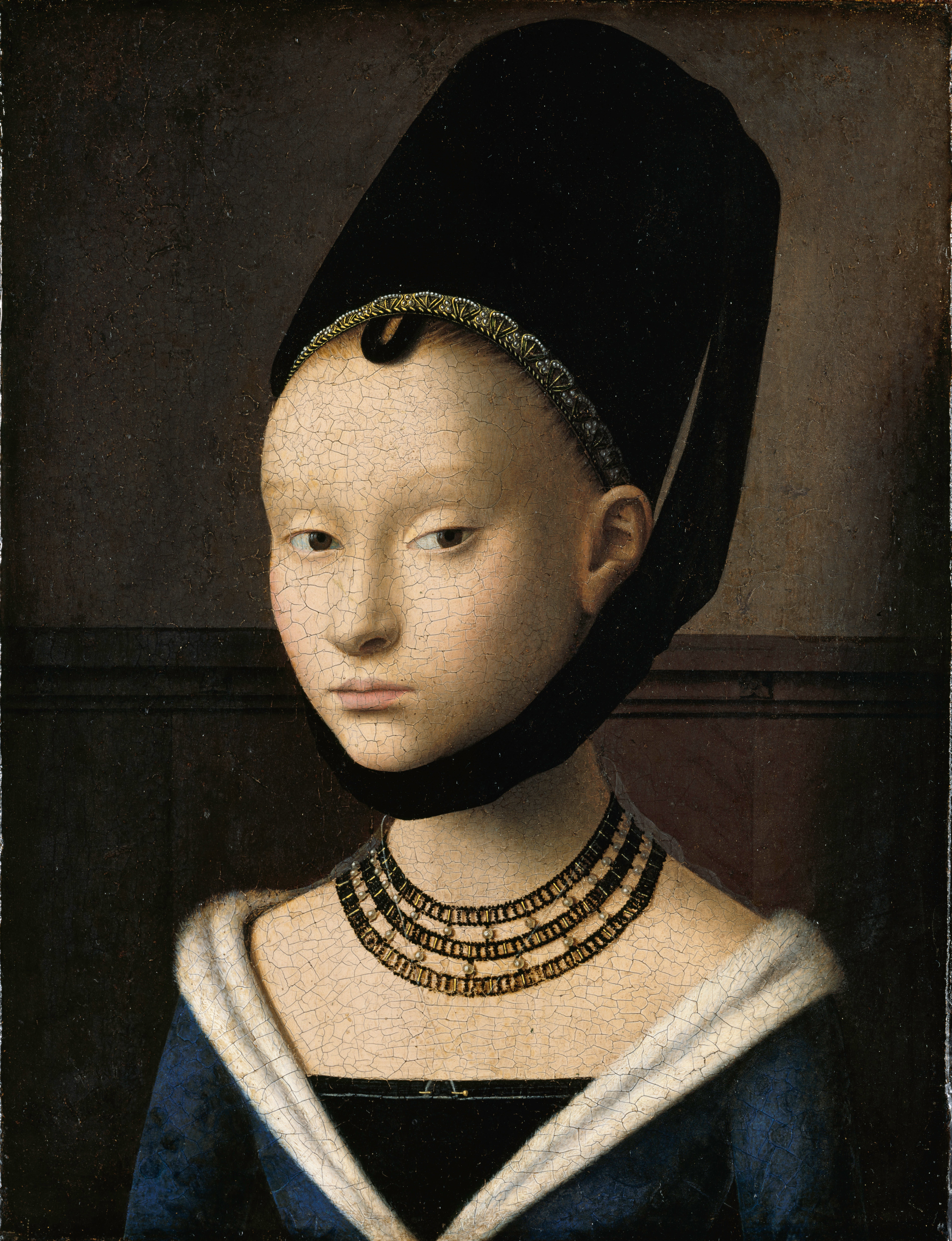
Petrus Christus, c. 1470

Hieronymus Bosch, c. 1480–1505

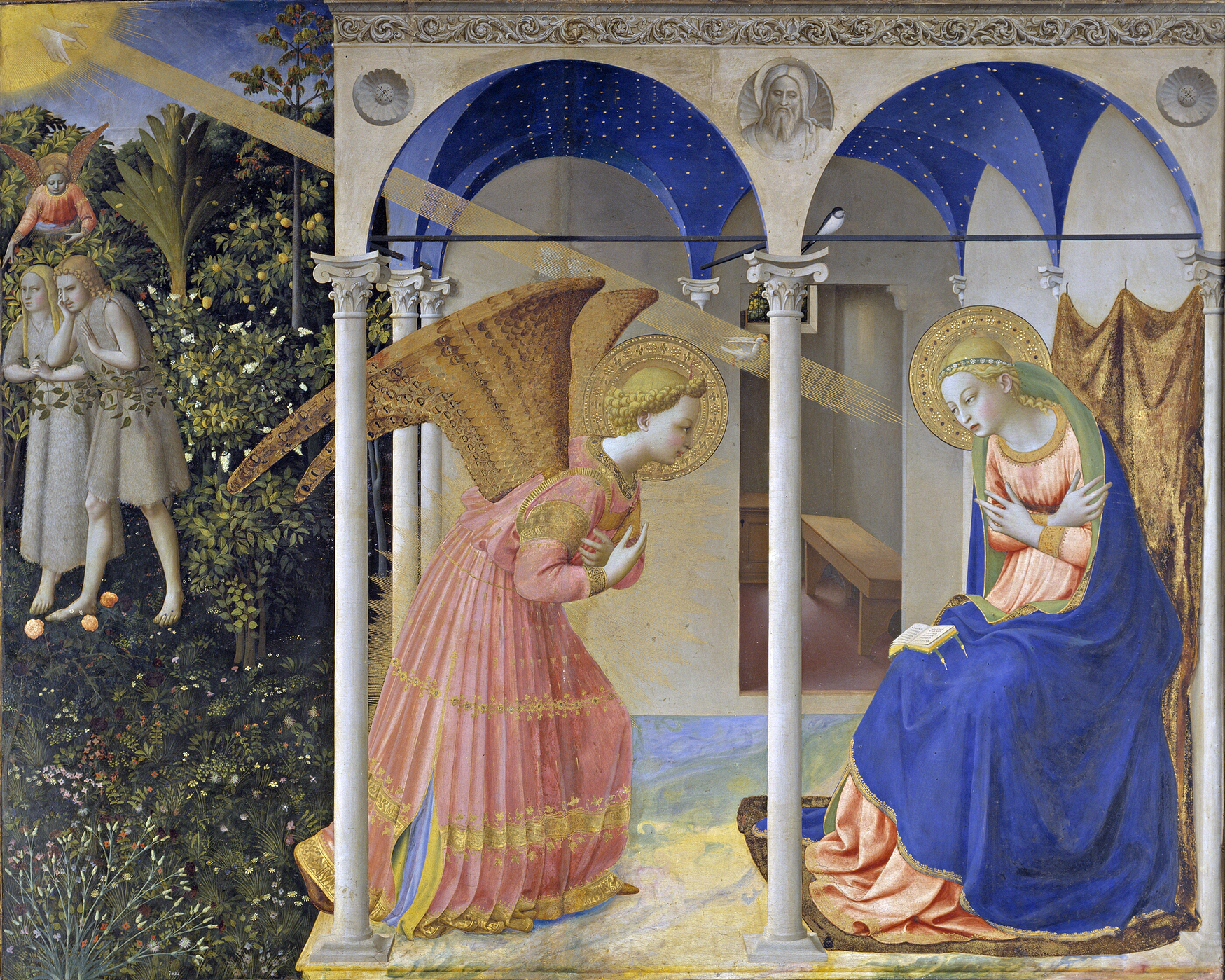
Fra Angelico, 1425–1428

Paolo Uccello, c. 1470

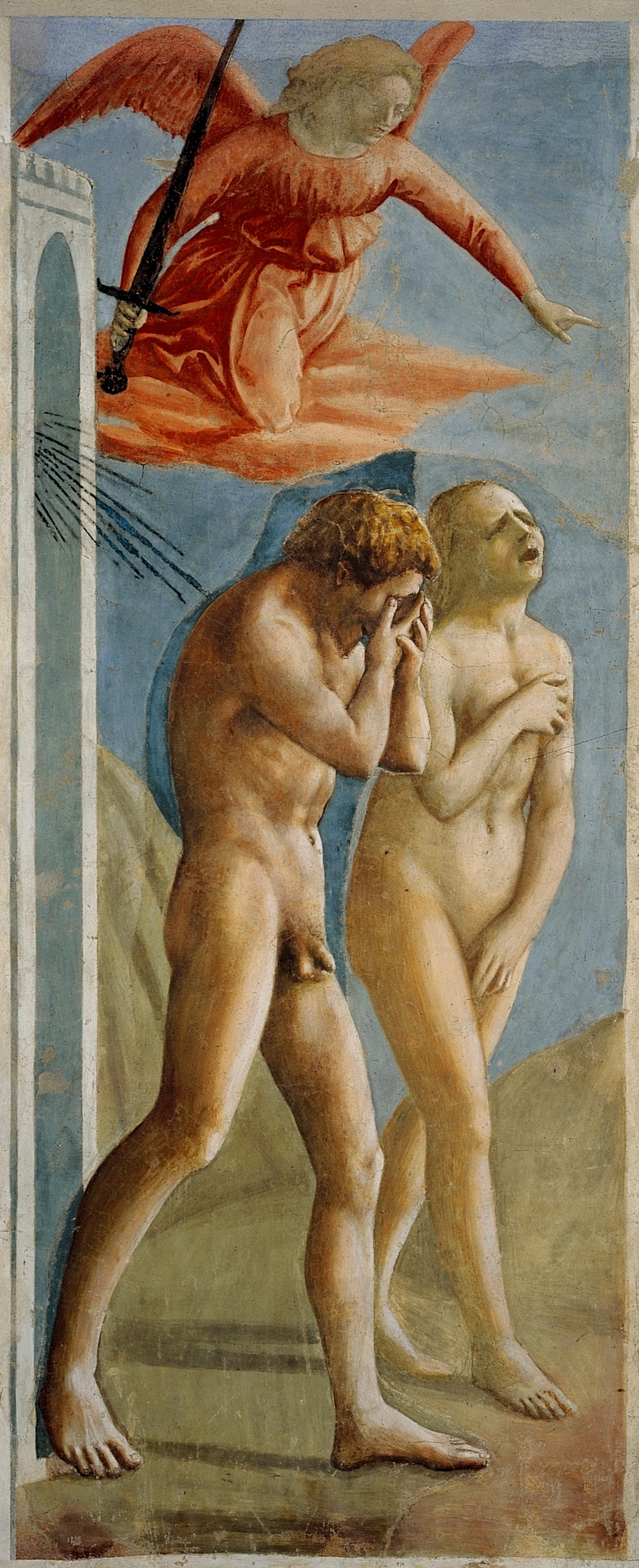
Masaccio, 1426–1427

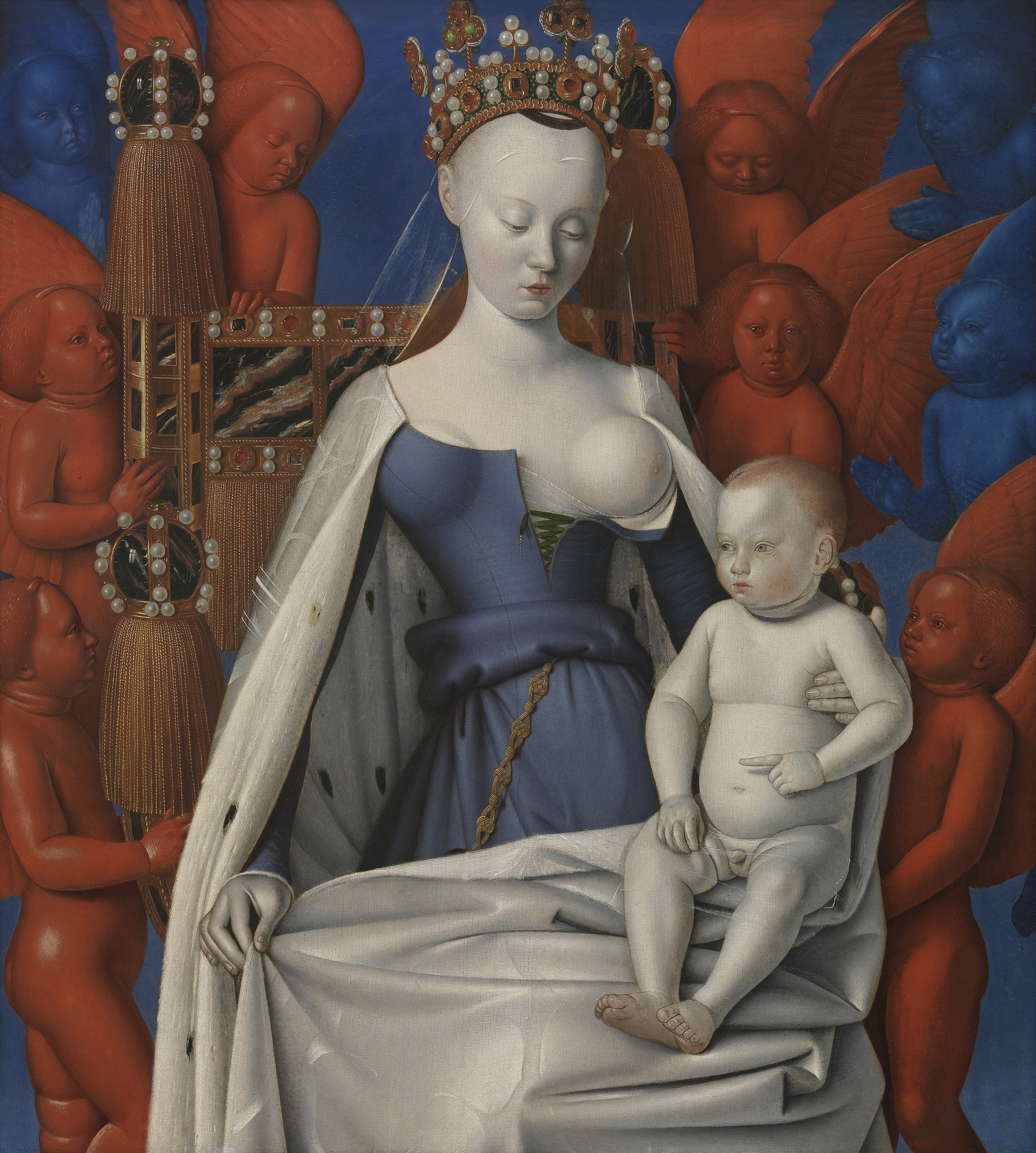
Jean Fouquet, 1450

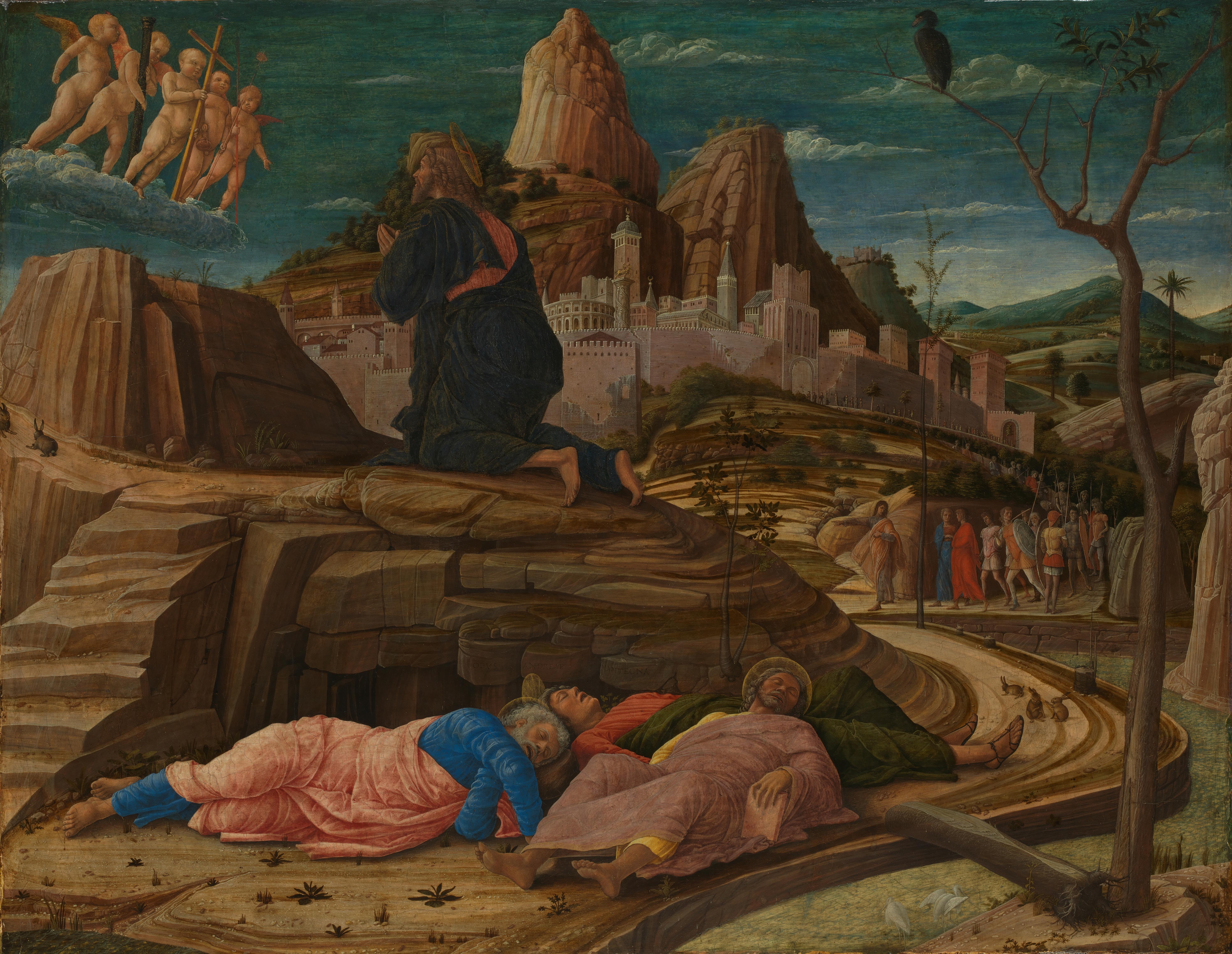
Andrea Mantegna, c. 1458–1460

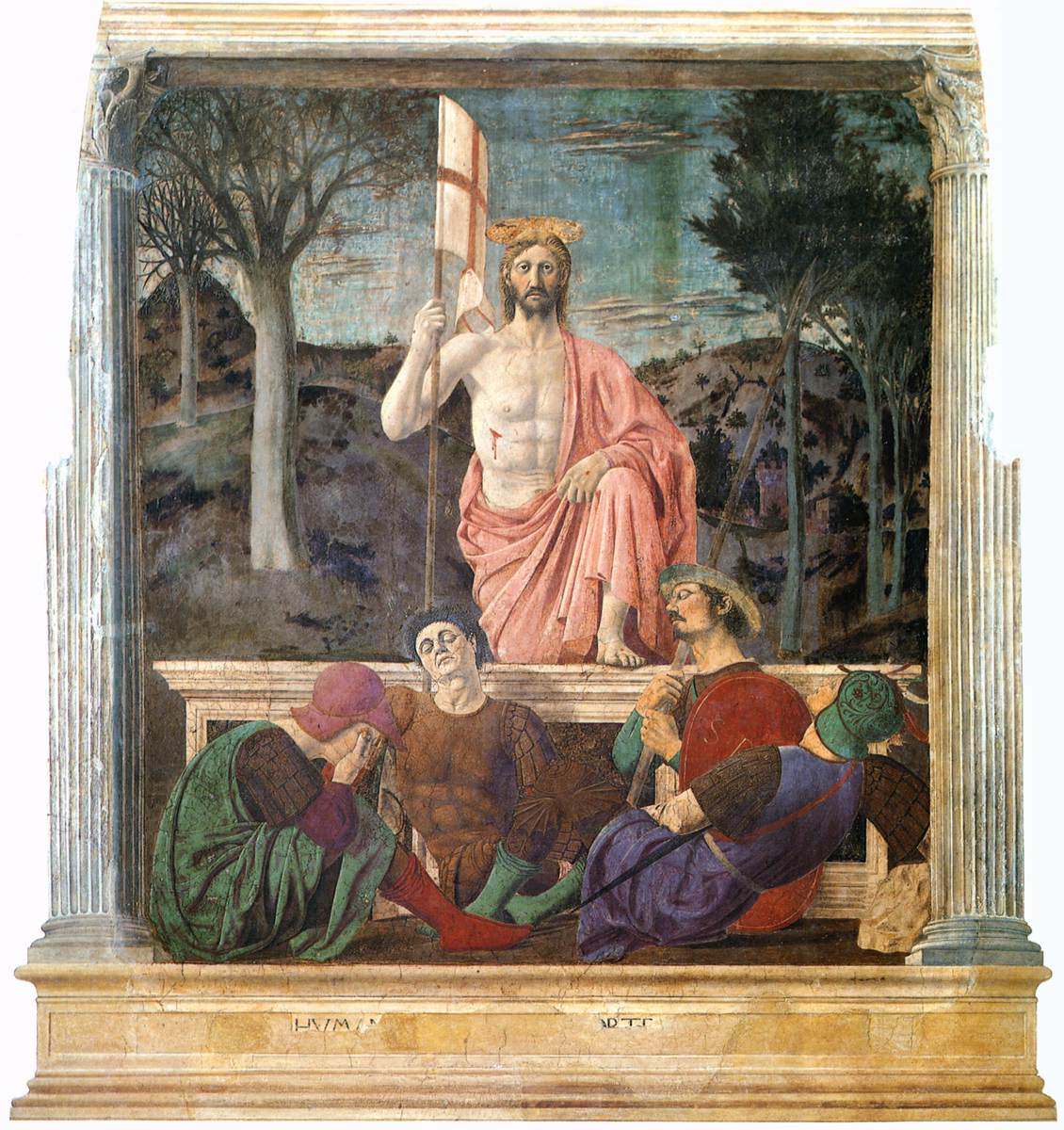
Piero della Francesca, 1463–1465

Sandro Botticelli, 1483–1485

Leonardo da Vinci, 1503–1506

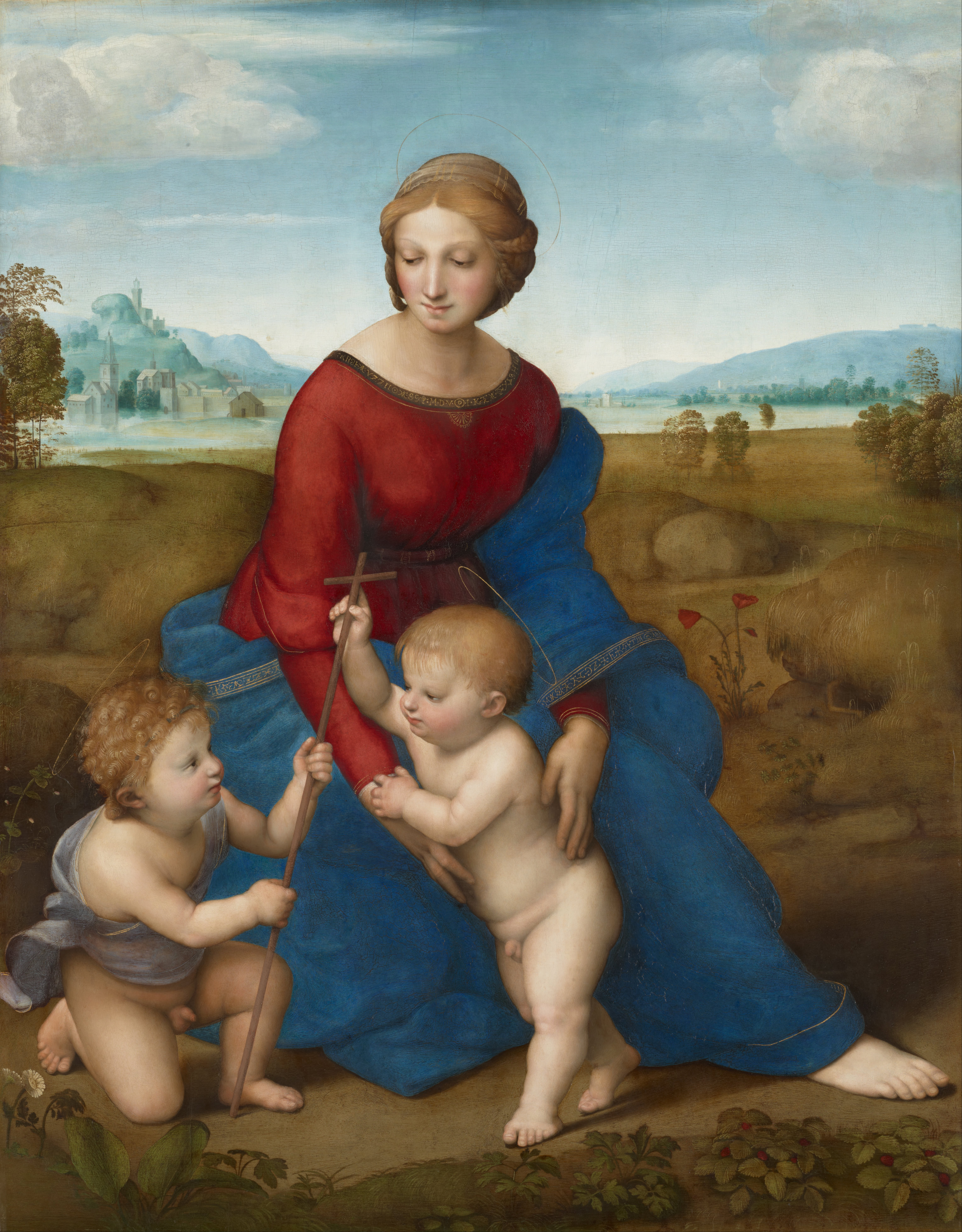
Raphael, 1505–1506

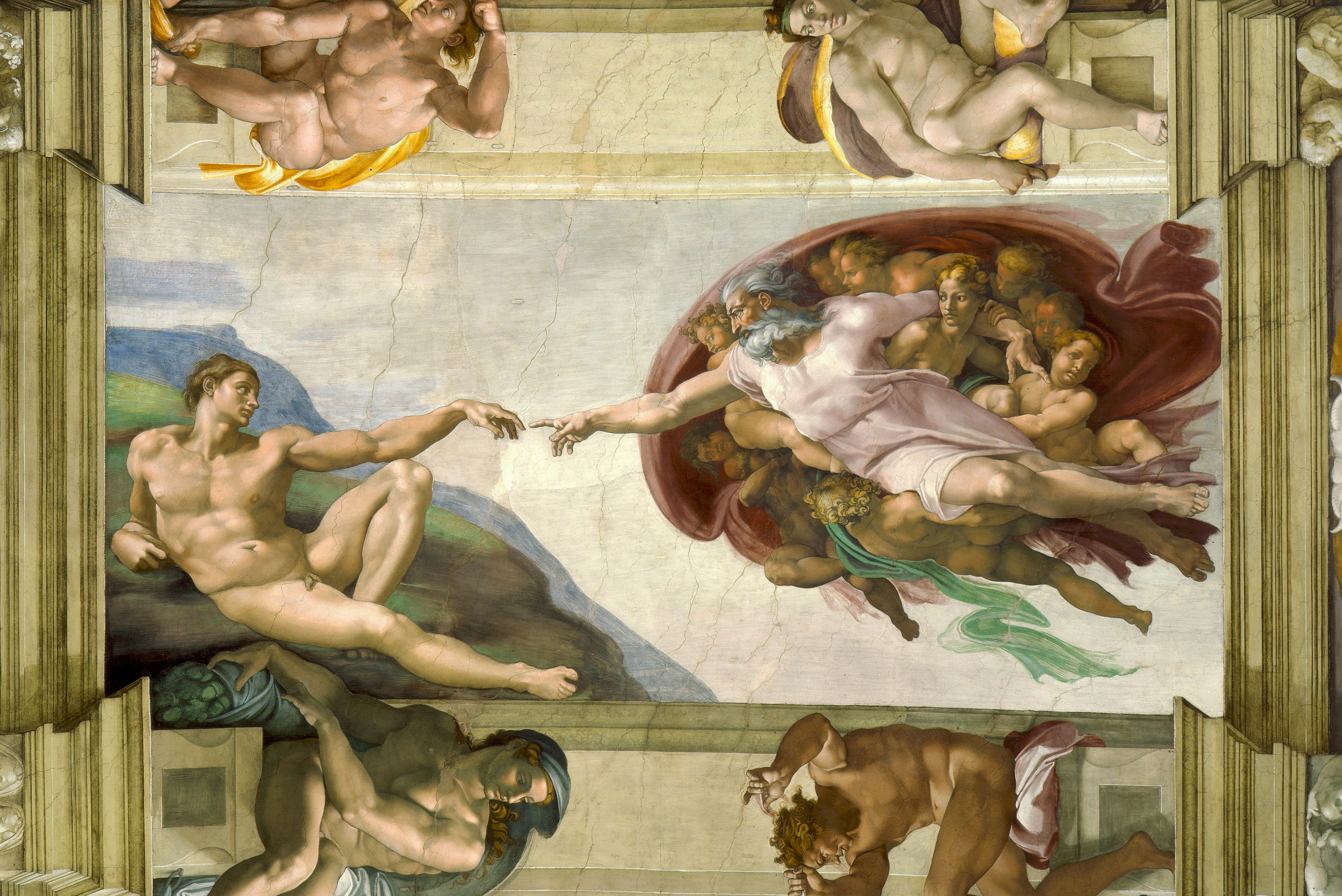
Michelangelo, c. 1511

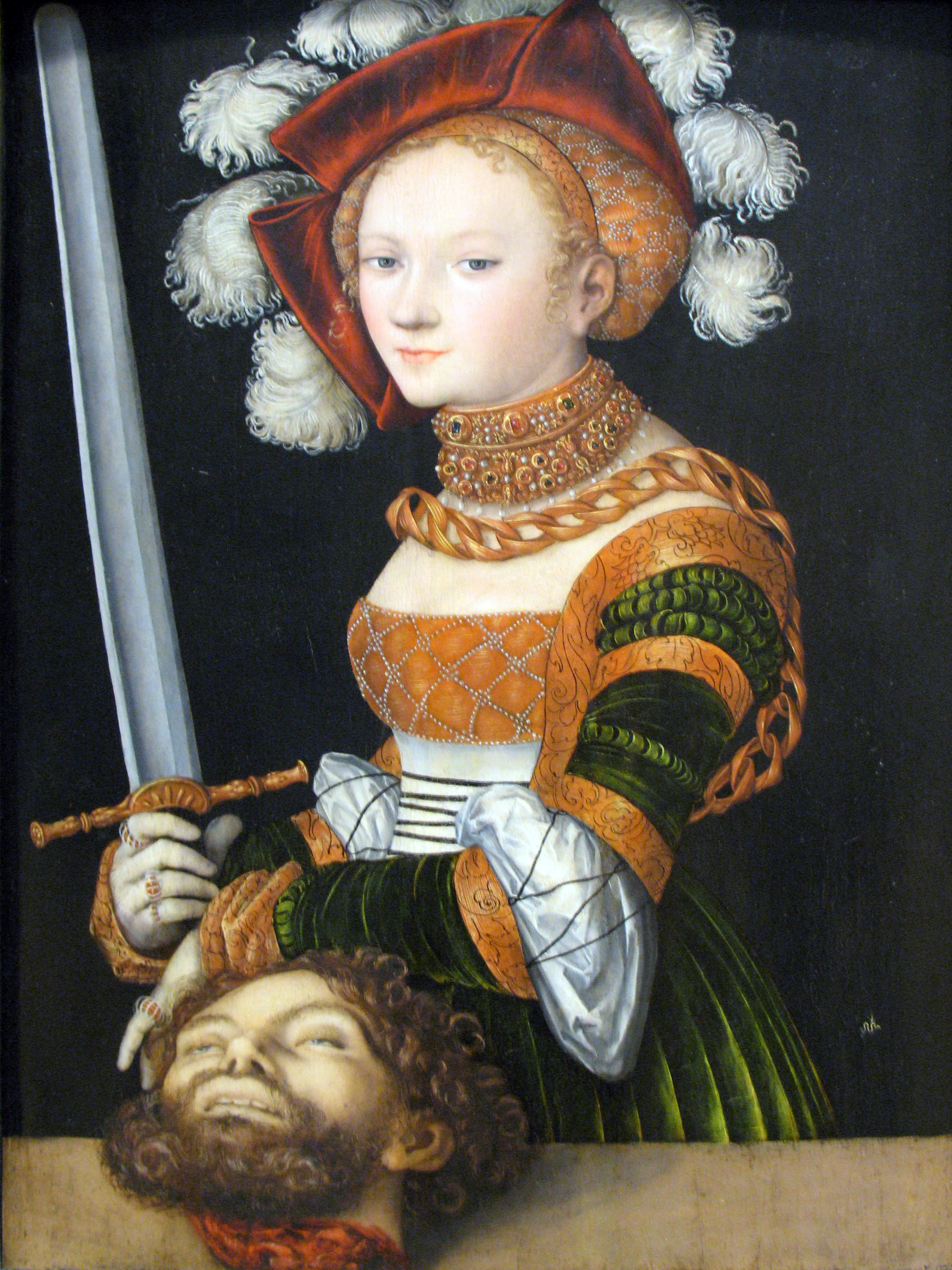
Lucas Cranach the Elder, c. 1530

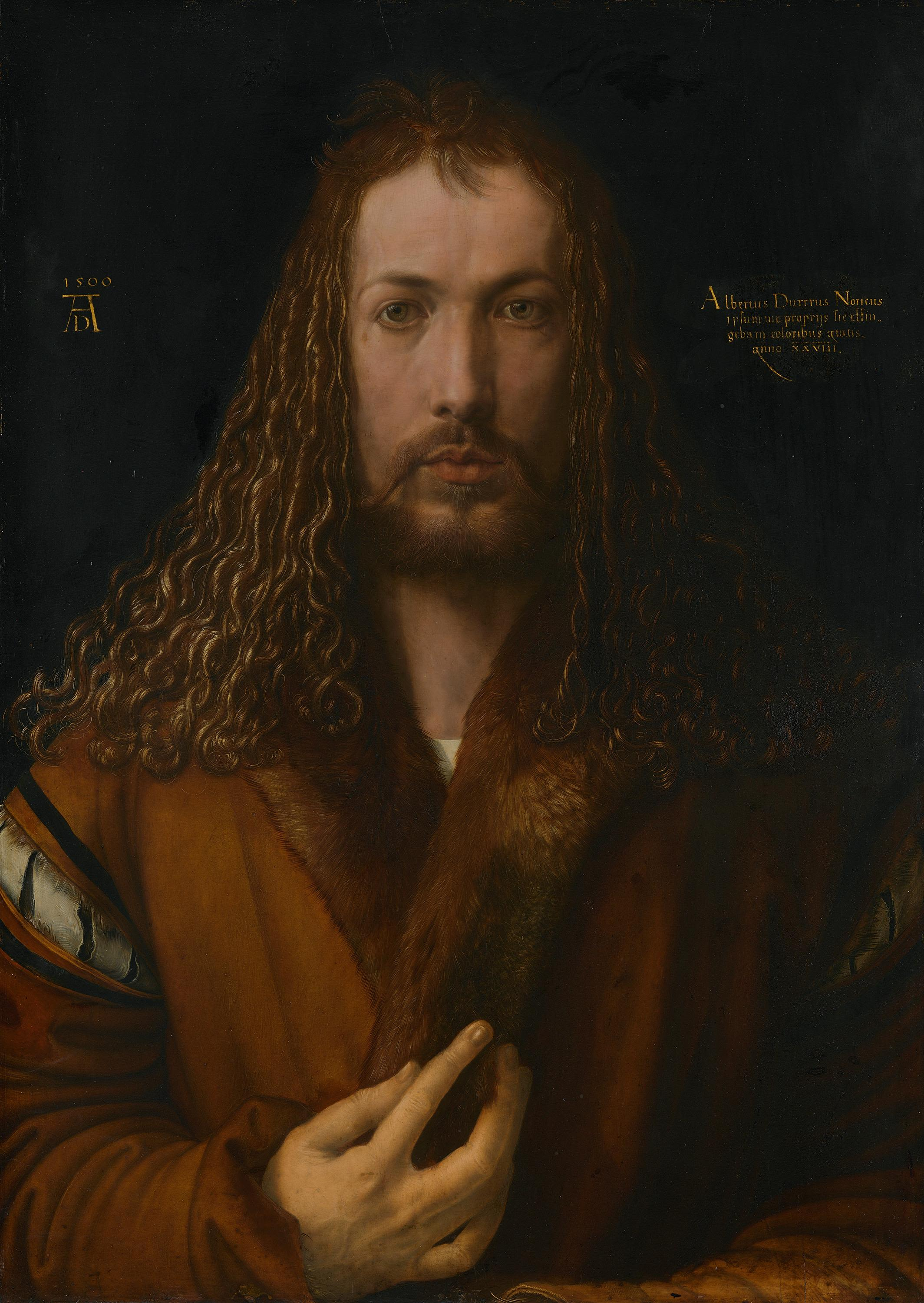
Albrecht Dürer, 1500

Matthias Grünewald, 1512–1516

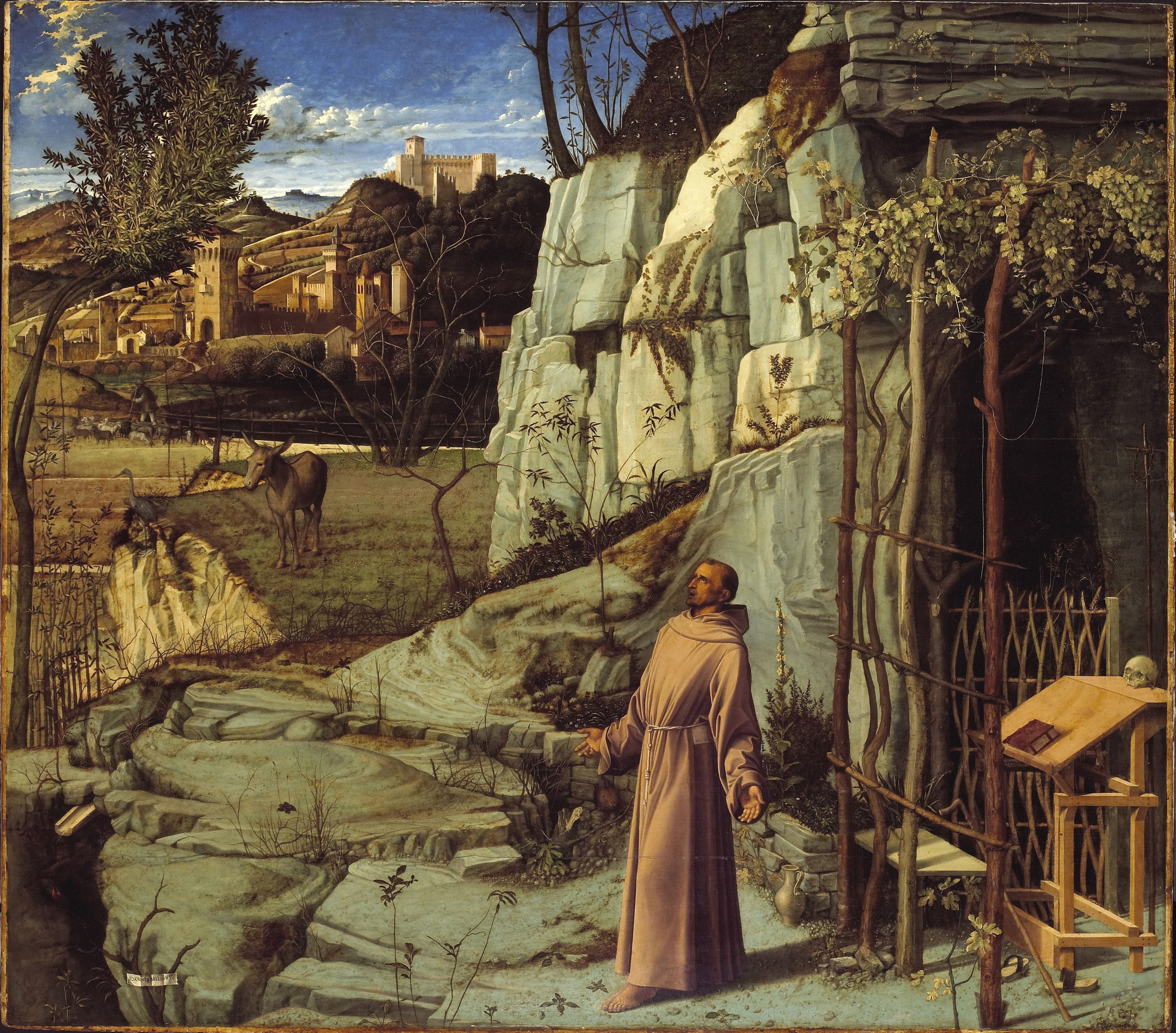
Giovanni Bellini, c. 1480

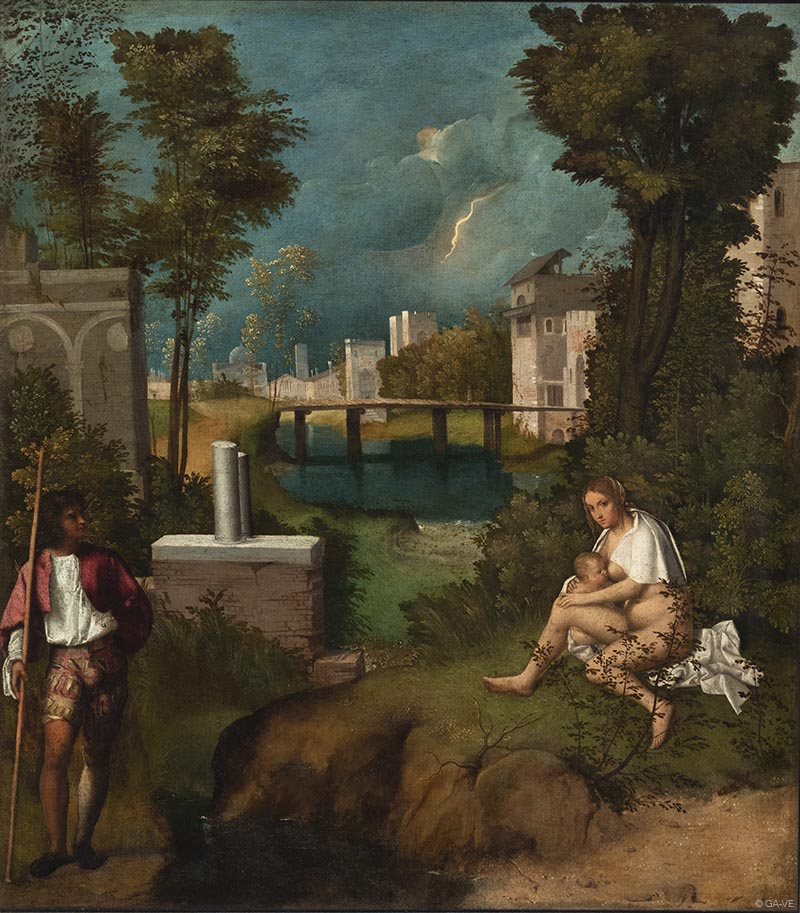
Giorgione, c. 1505

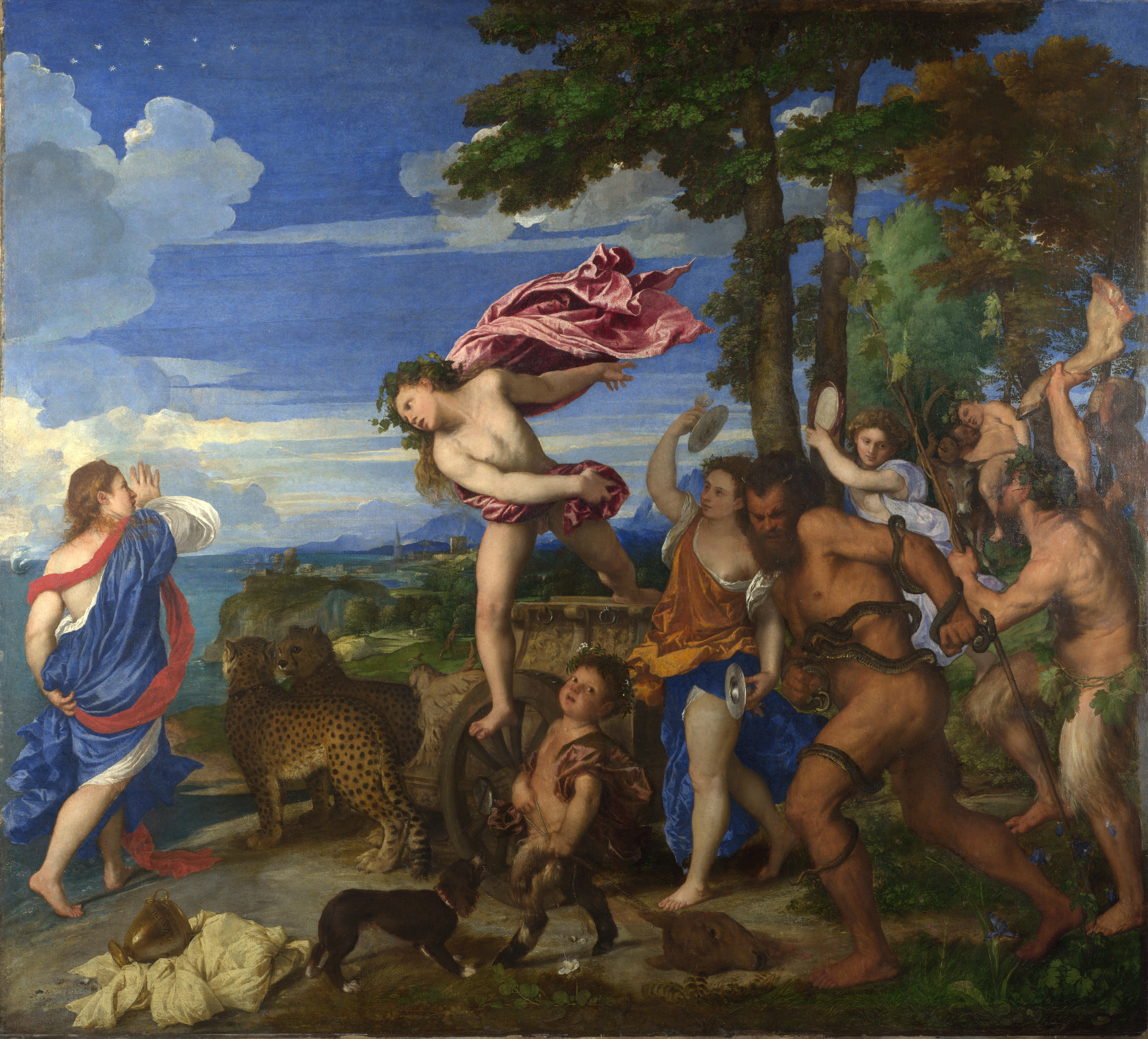
Titian, 1520–1523

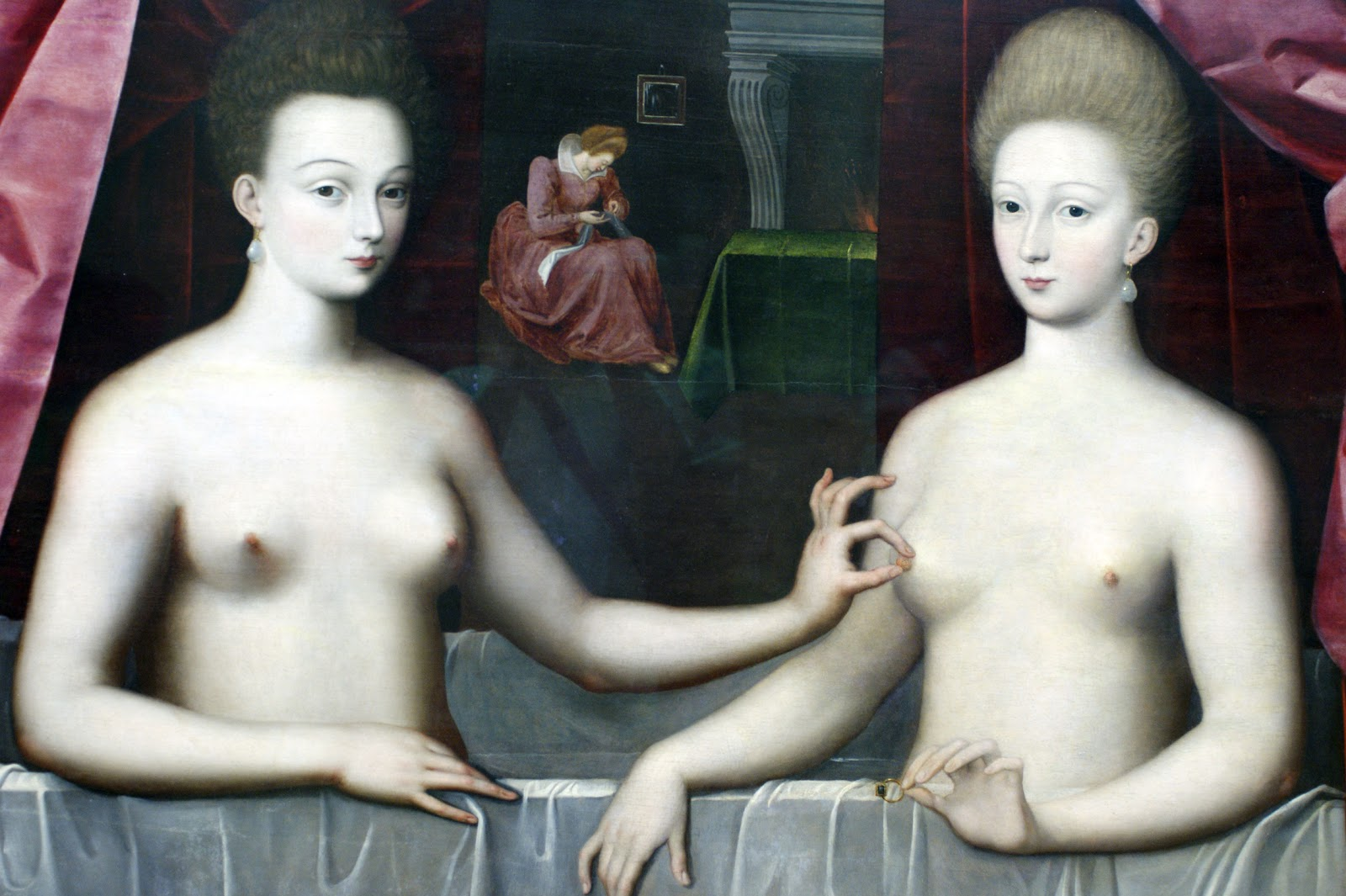
École de Fontainebleau, 1530

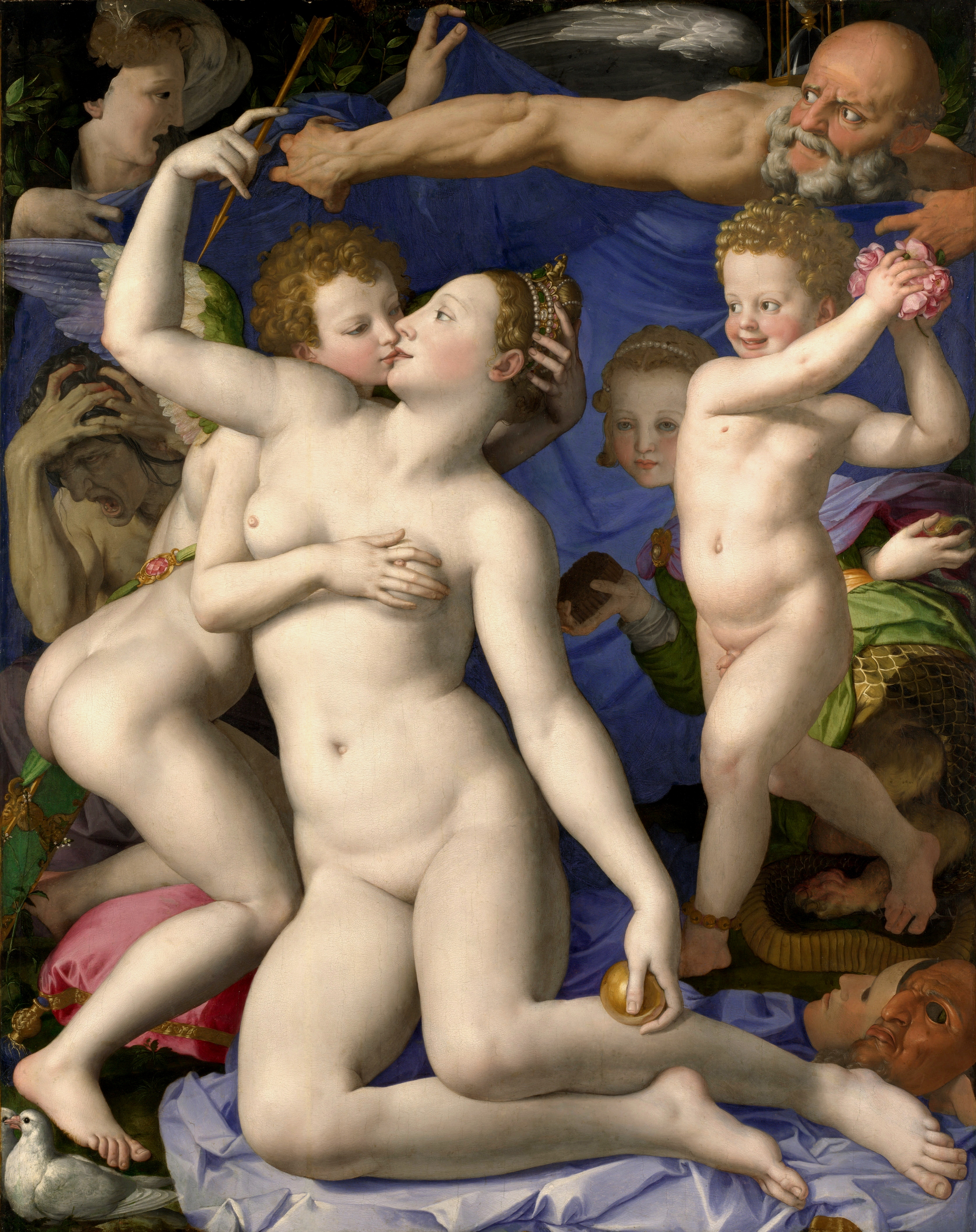
Bronzino, 1540–1545

Pieter Bruegel, 1565

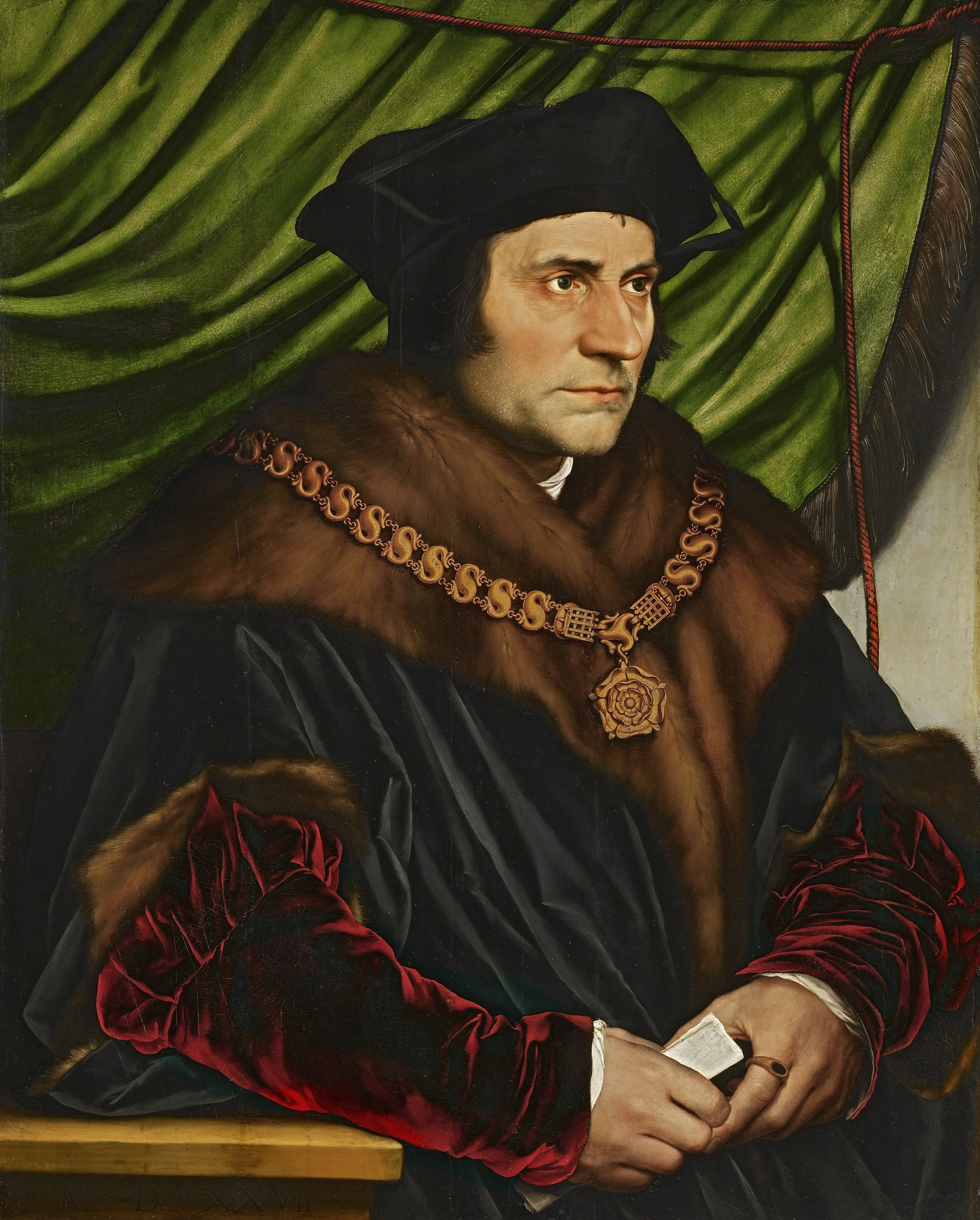
Hans Holbein the Younger, 1527

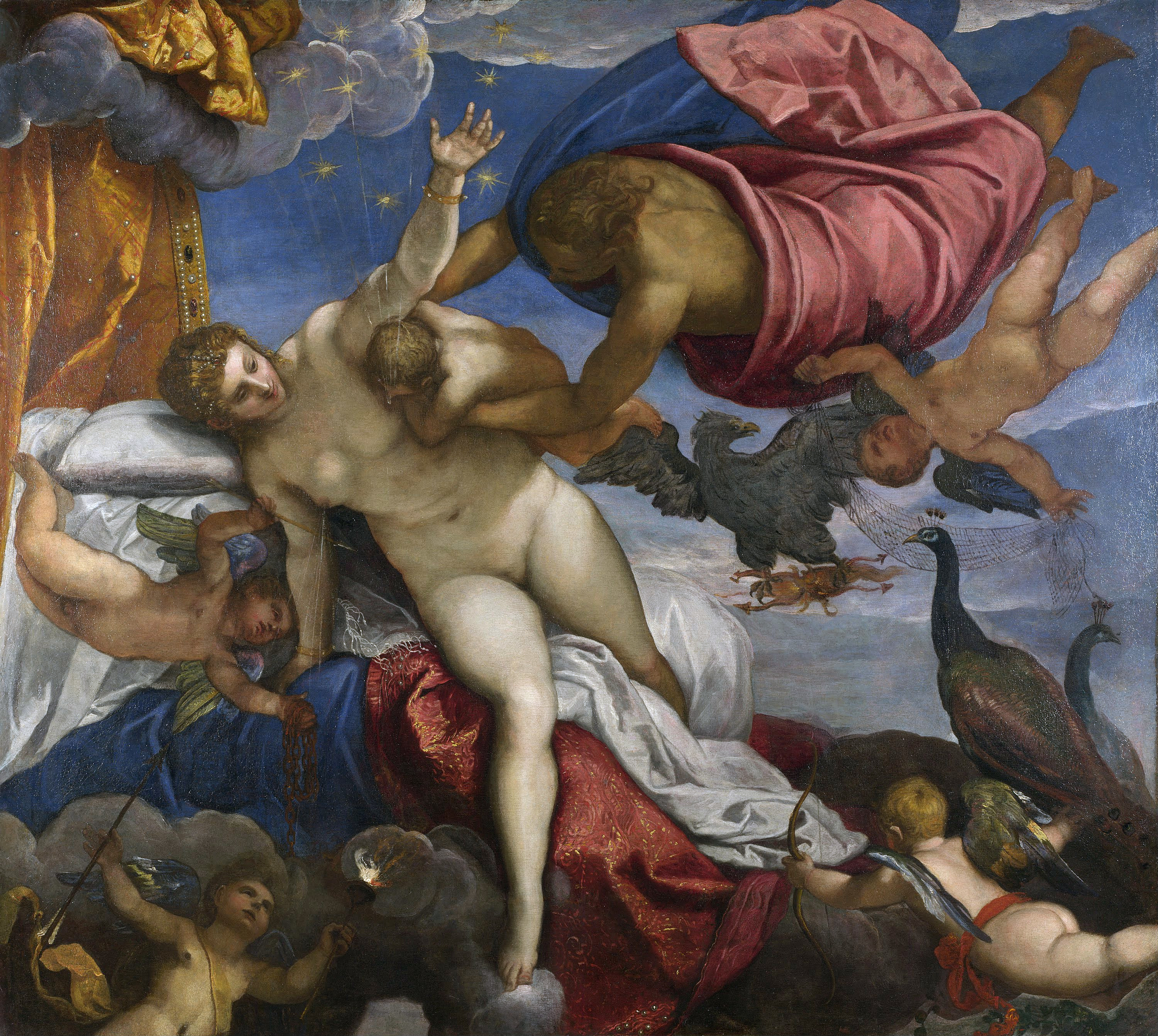
Jacopo Tintoretto, 1582

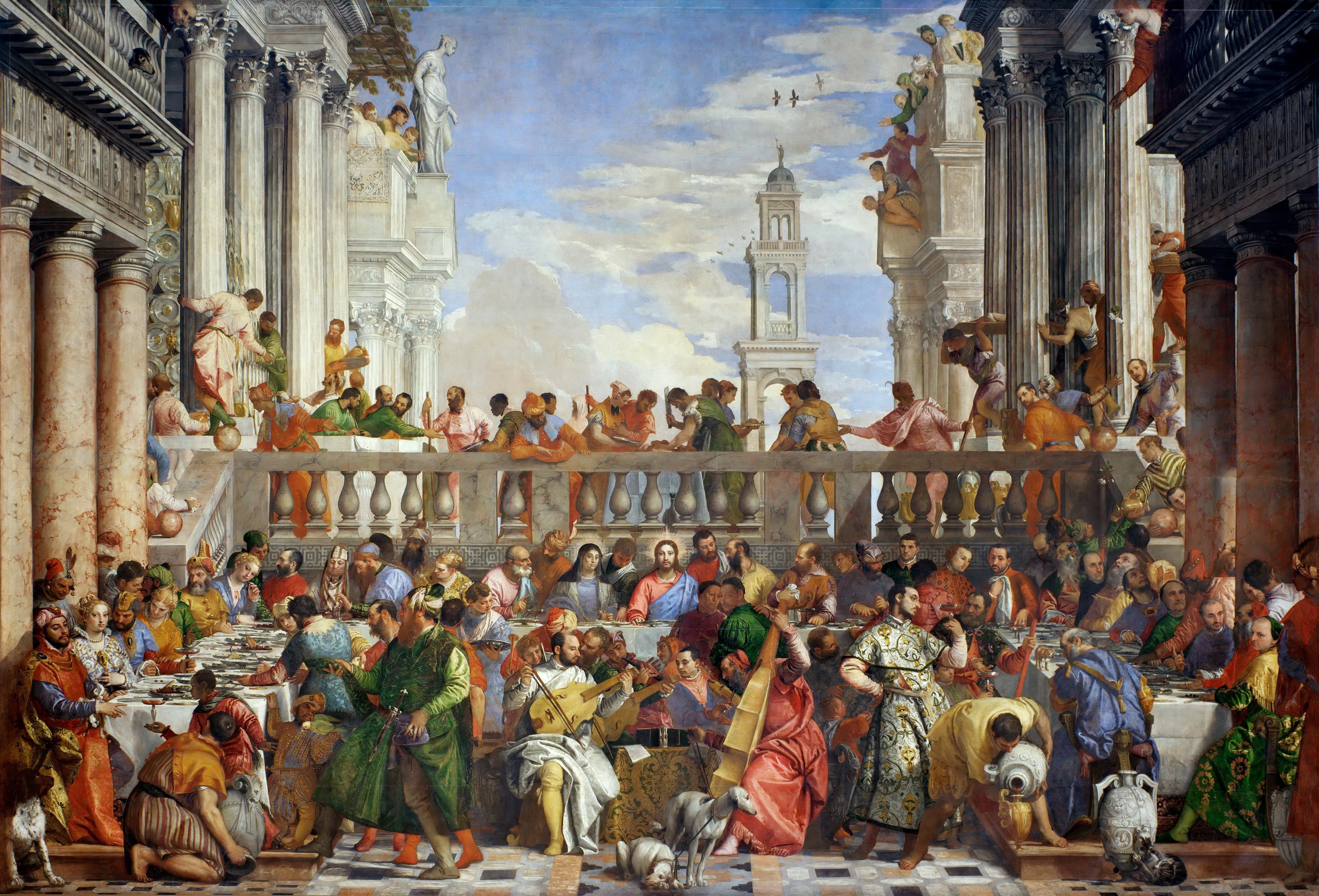
Paolo Veronese, 1562–1563

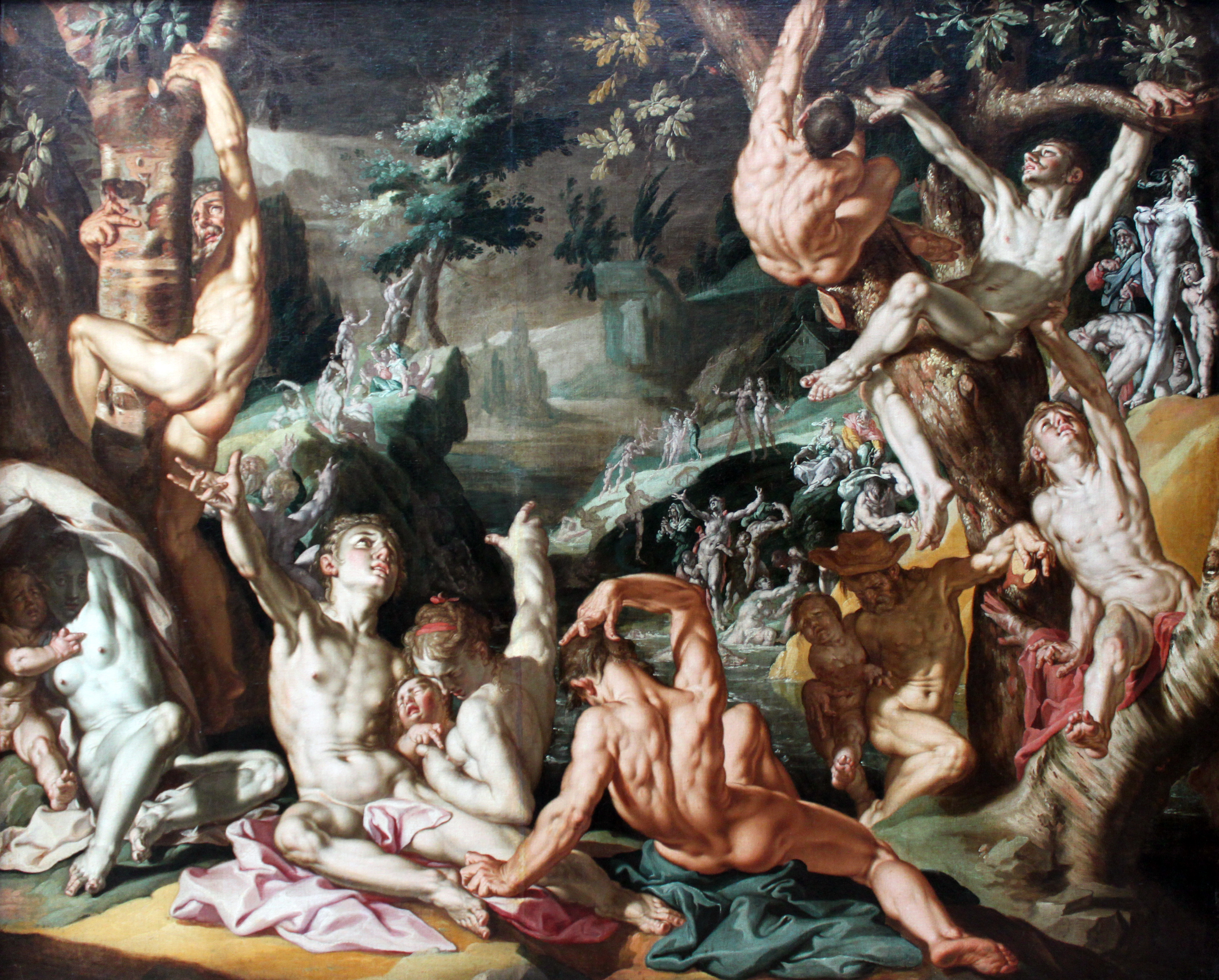
Joachim Wtewael, 1595

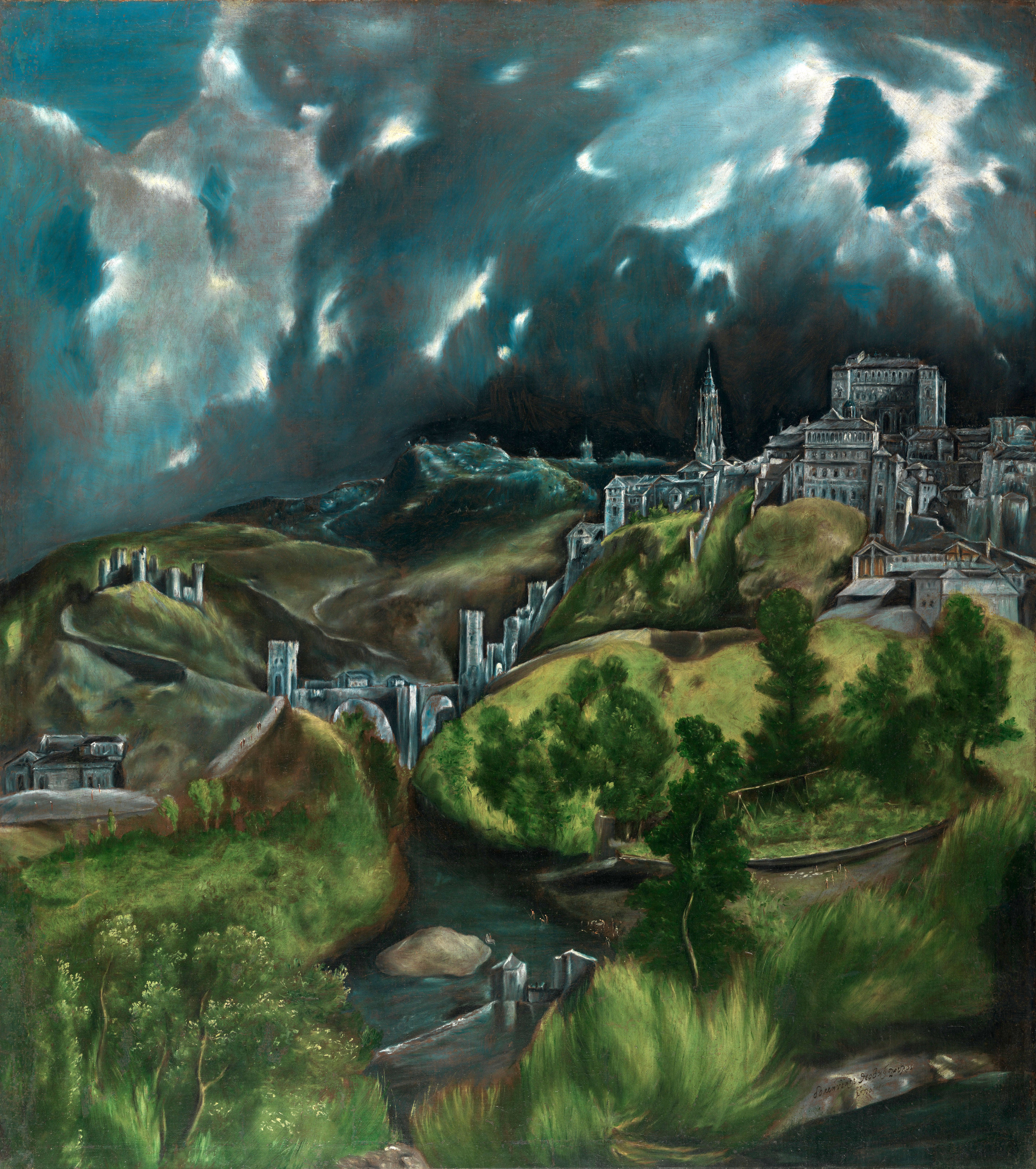
El Greco, 1596–1600

=== Baroque and Rococo ===
Baroque painting is associated with the Baroque cultural movement, a movement often identified with Absolutism and the Counter Reformation or Catholic Revival; the existence of important Baroque painting in non-absolutist and Protestant states also, however, underscores its popularity, as the style spread throughout Western Europe.

Baroque painting is characterized by great drama, rich, deep color, and intense light and dark shadows. Baroque art was meant to evoke emotion and passion instead of the calm rationality that had been prized during the Renaissance. During the period beginning around 1600 and continuing throughout the 17th century, painting is characterized as Baroque. Among the greatest painters of the Baroque are Caravaggio, Rembrandt, Frans Hals, Rubens, Velázquez, Poussin, and Johannes Vermeer. Caravaggio is an heir of the humanist painting of the High Renaissance. His realistic approach to the human figure, painted directly from life and dramatically spotlit against a dark background, shocked his contemporaries and opened a new chapter in the history of painting. Baroque painting often dramatizes scenes using light effects; this can be seen in works by Rembrandt, Vermeer, Le Nain, La Tour, and Jusepe de Ribera.

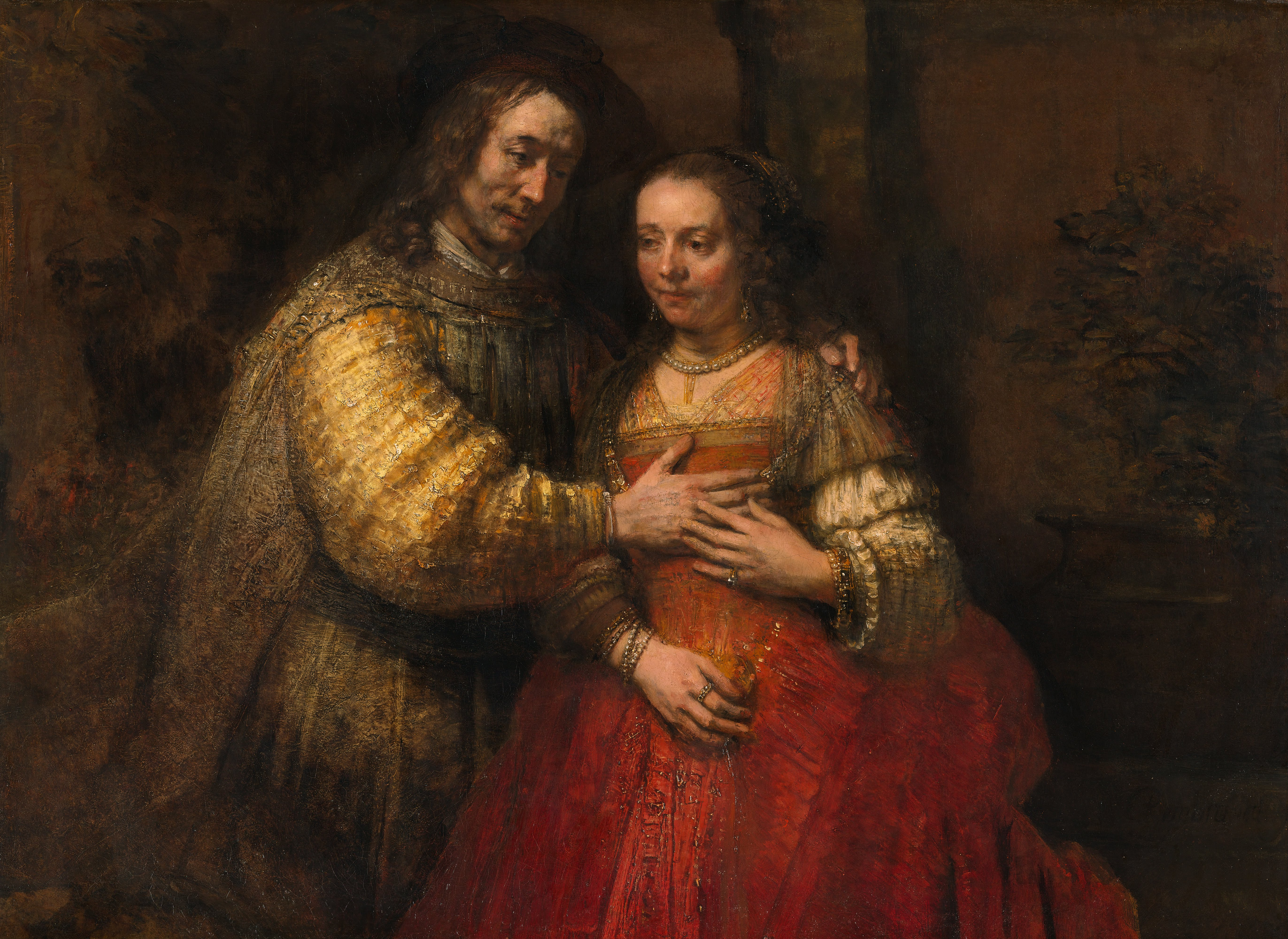
Rembrandt van Rijn, The Jewish Bride, ca. 1665–1669

In Italy, the Baroque style is epitomized by religious and mythological paintings in the Grand Manner by artists such as the Carracci, Guido Reni, and Luca Giordano. Illusionistic church ceiling frescoes by Pietro da Cortona seemed to open to the sky. A much quieter type of Baroque emerged in the Dutch Republic, where easel paintings of everyday subjects were popular with middle-class collectors, and many painters became specialists in genre, others in landscape or seascape or still life. Vermeer, Gerard ter Borch, and Pieter de Hooch brought great technical refinement to the painting of domestic scenes, as did Willem Claesz. Heda to still life. In contrast, Rembrandt excelled in painting every type of subject, and developed an individual painterly style in which the chiaroscuro and dark backgrounds derived from Caravaggio and the Utrecht Caravaggists lose their theatrical quality.

During the 18th century, Rococo followed as a lighter extension of Baroque, often frivolous and erotic. Rococo developed first in the decorative arts and interior design in France. Louis XV's succession brought a change in the court artists and general artistic fashion. The 1730s represented the height of Rococo development in France exemplified by the works of Antoine Watteau and François Boucher. Rococo still maintained the Baroque taste for complex forms and intricate patterns, but by this point, it had begun to integrate a variety of diverse characteristics, including a taste for Oriental designs and asymmetric compositions.

The Rococo style spread with French artists and engraved publications. It was readily received in the Catholic parts of Germany, Bohemia, and Austria, where it was merged with the lively German Baroque traditions. German Rococo was applied with enthusiasm to churches and palaces, particularly in the south, while Frederician Rococo developed in the Kingdom of Prussia.

The French masters Watteau, Boucher and Fragonard represent the style, as do Giovanni Battista Tiepolo and Jean-Baptiste-Siméon Chardin who was considered by some as the best French painter of the 18th century – the Anti-Rococo. Portraiture was an important component of painting in all countries, but especially in England, where the leaders were William Hogarth, in a blunt realist style, and Francis Hayman, Angelica Kauffman (who was Swiss), Thomas Gainsborough and Joshua Reynolds in more flattering styles influenced by Anthony van Dyck. In France during the Rococo era Jean-Baptiste Greuze (the favorite painter of Denis Diderot), excelled in portraits and history paintings, and Maurice Quentin de La Tour and Élisabeth Vigée-Lebrun were highly accomplished portrait painters. La Tour specialized in pastel painting, which became a popular medium during this period.

William Hogarth helped develop a theoretical foundation for Rococo beauty. Though not intentionally referencing the movement, he argued in his Analysis of Beauty (1753) that the undulating lines and S-curves prominent in Rococo were the basis for grace and beauty in art or nature (unlike the straight line or the circle in Classicism). The beginning of the end for Rococo came in the early 1760s as figures like Voltaire and Jacques-François Blondel began to voice their criticism of the superficiality and degeneracy of the art. Blondel decried the "ridiculous jumble of shells, dragons, reeds, palm-trees and plants" in contemporary interiors.

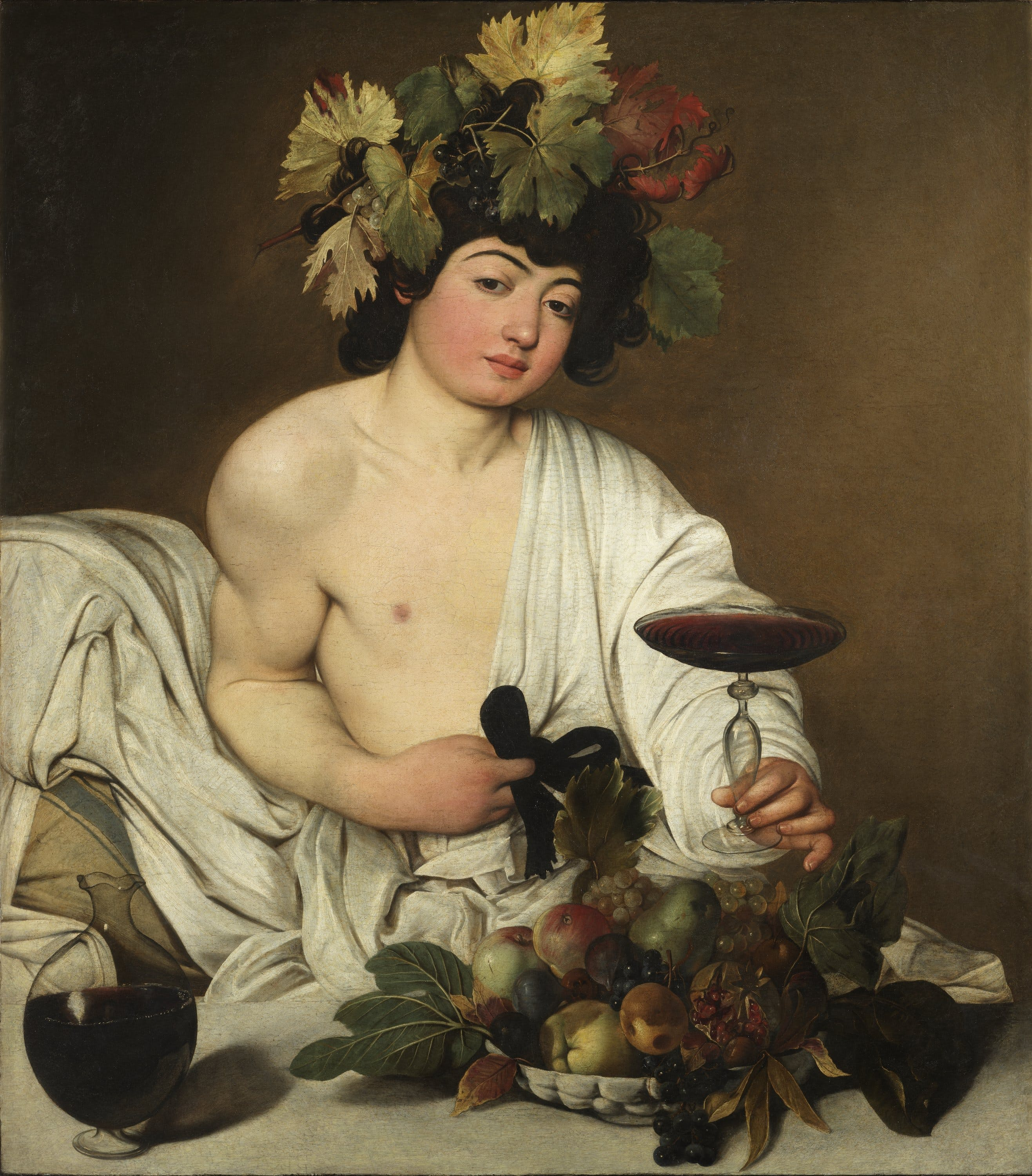
Caravaggio, 1595–1597

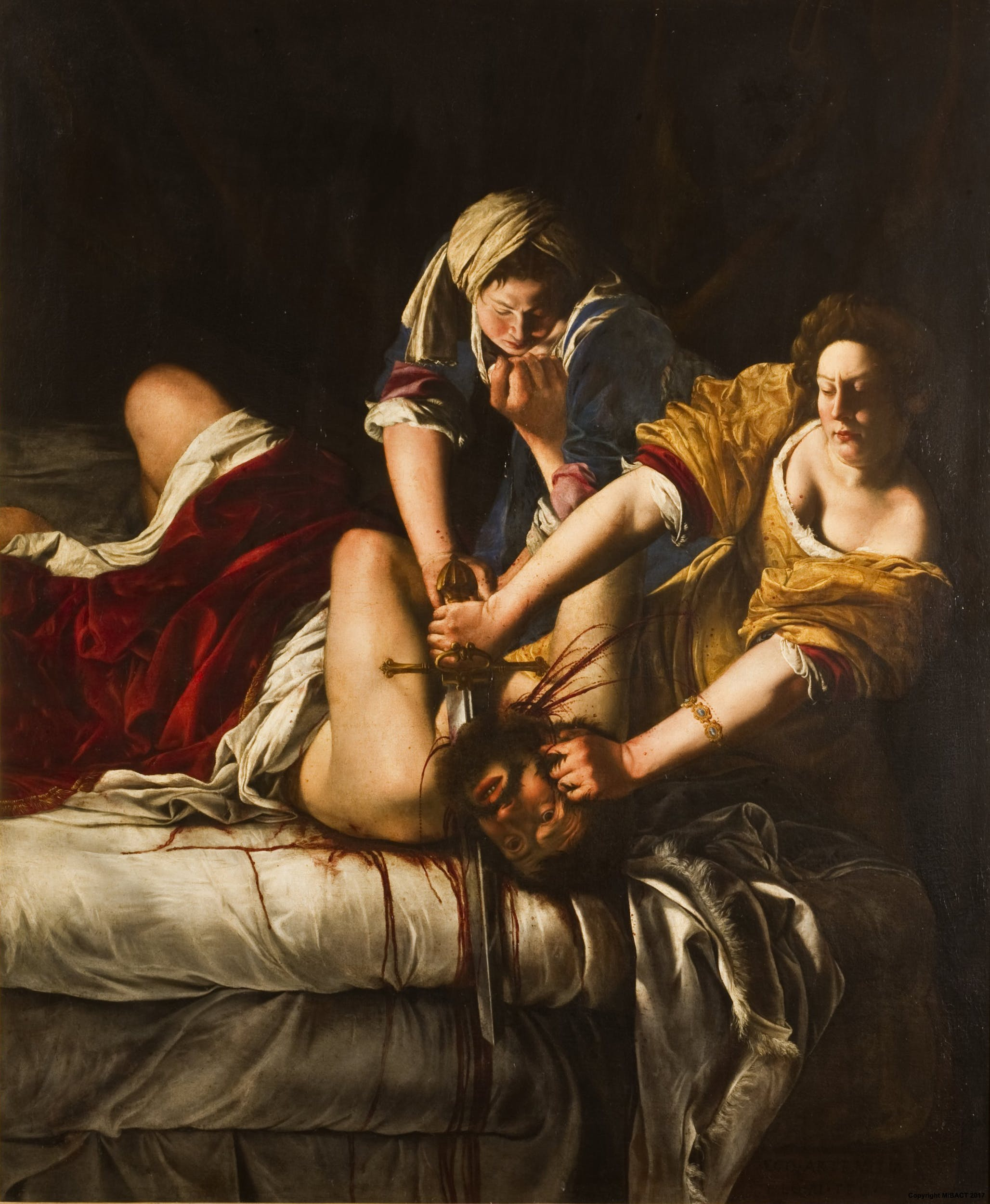
Artemisia Gentileschi, 1614–1620

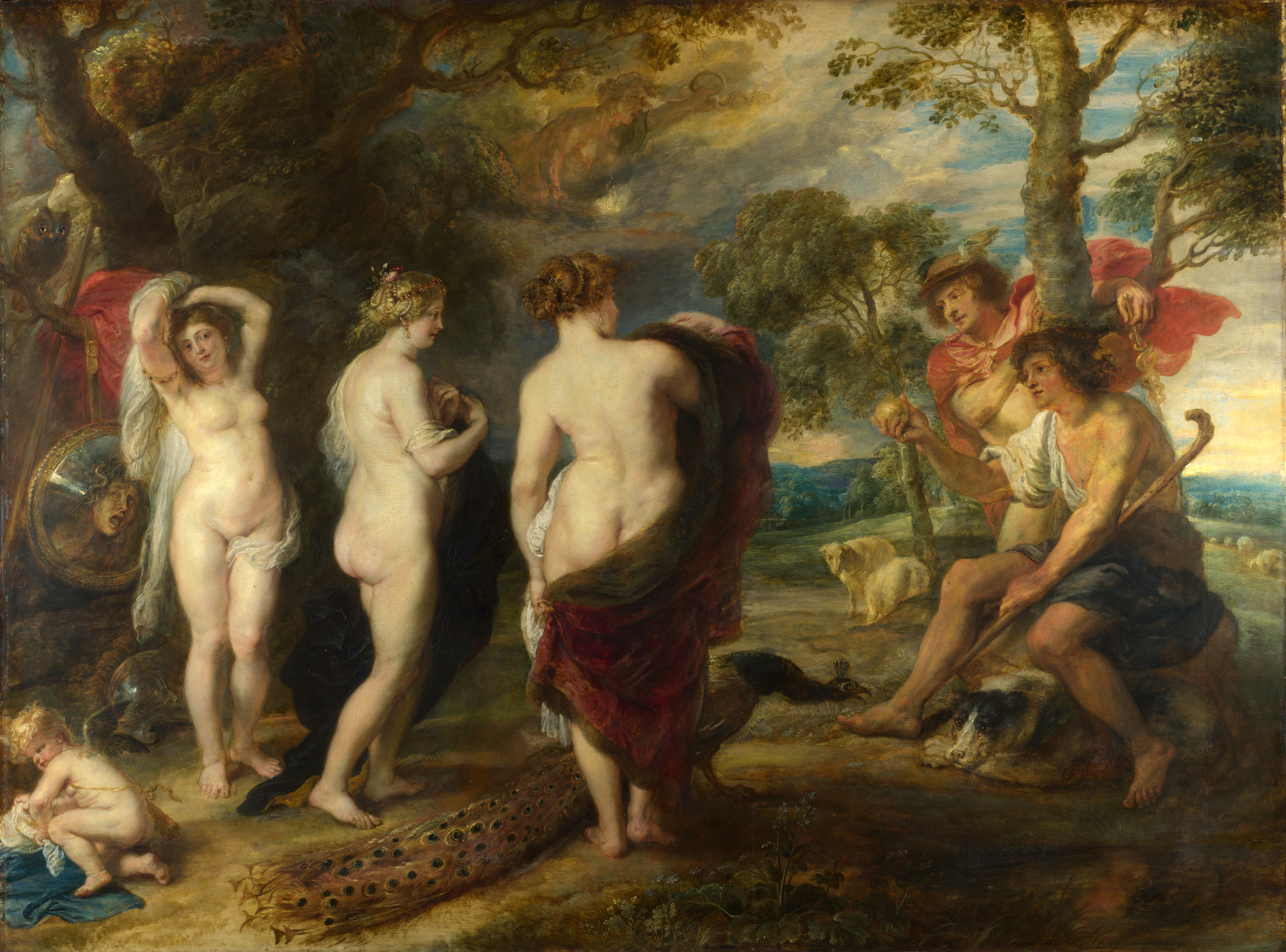
Peter Paul Rubens, 1632–1635

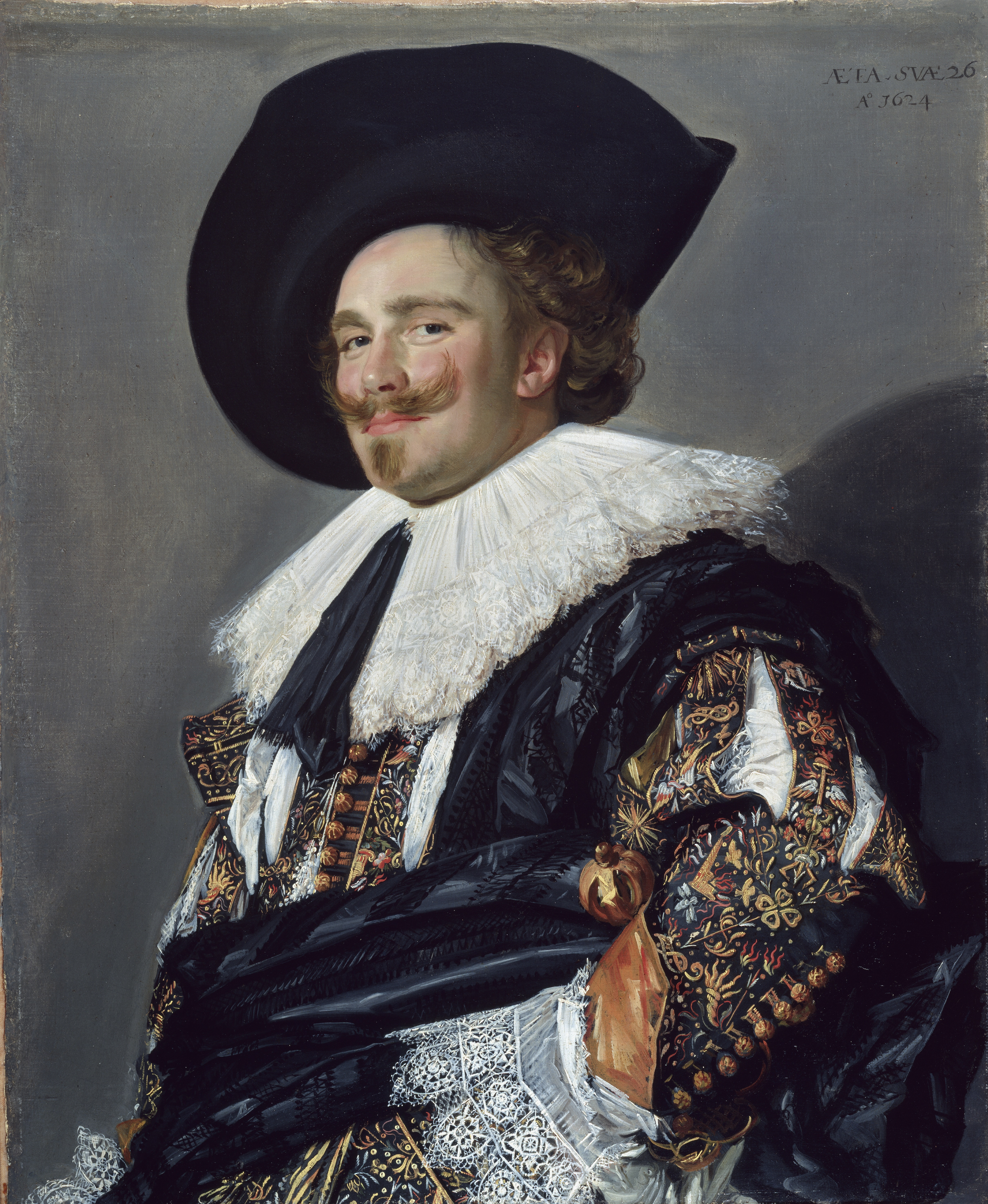
Frans Hals, 1624

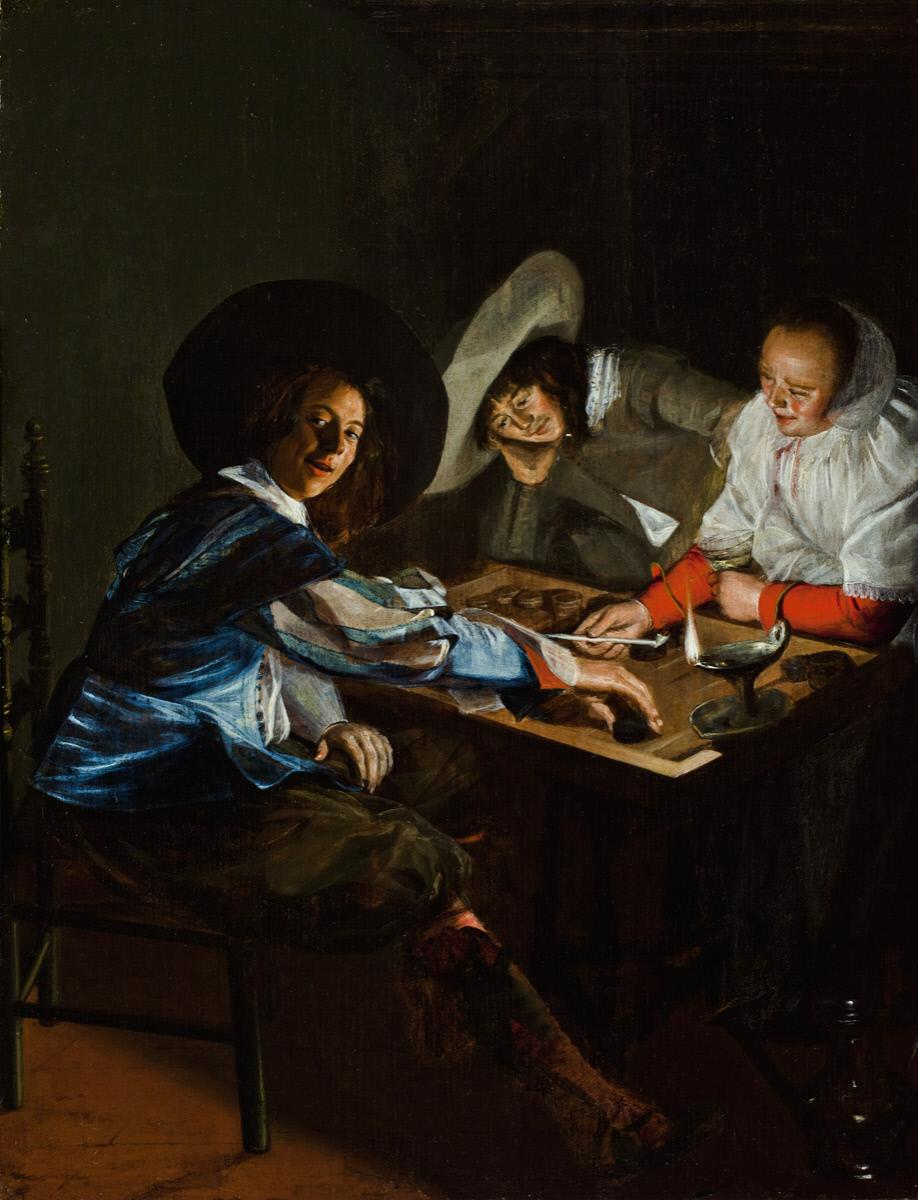
Judith Leyster, 1630

Rembrandt van Rijn, 1642

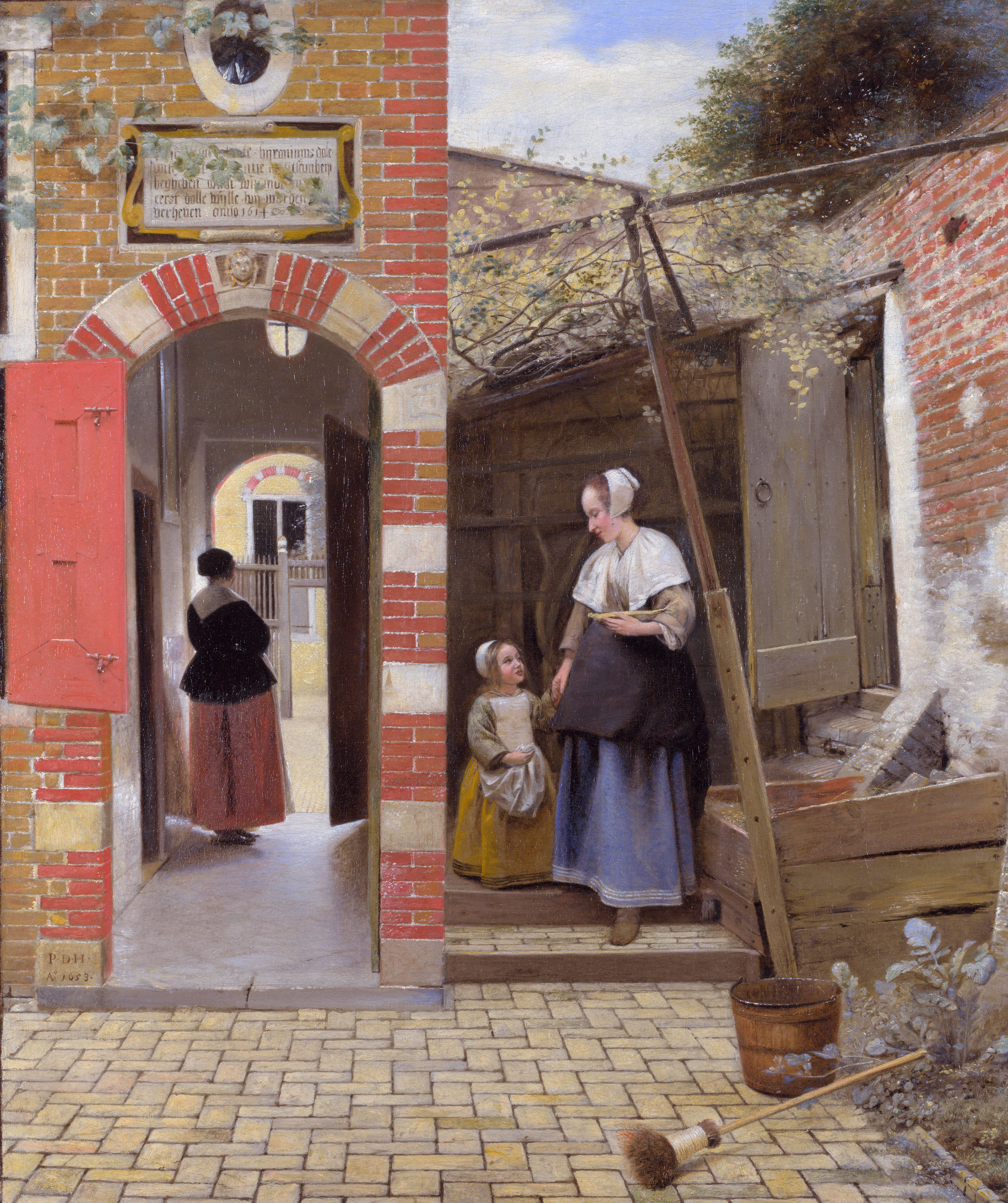
Pieter de Hooch, 1658

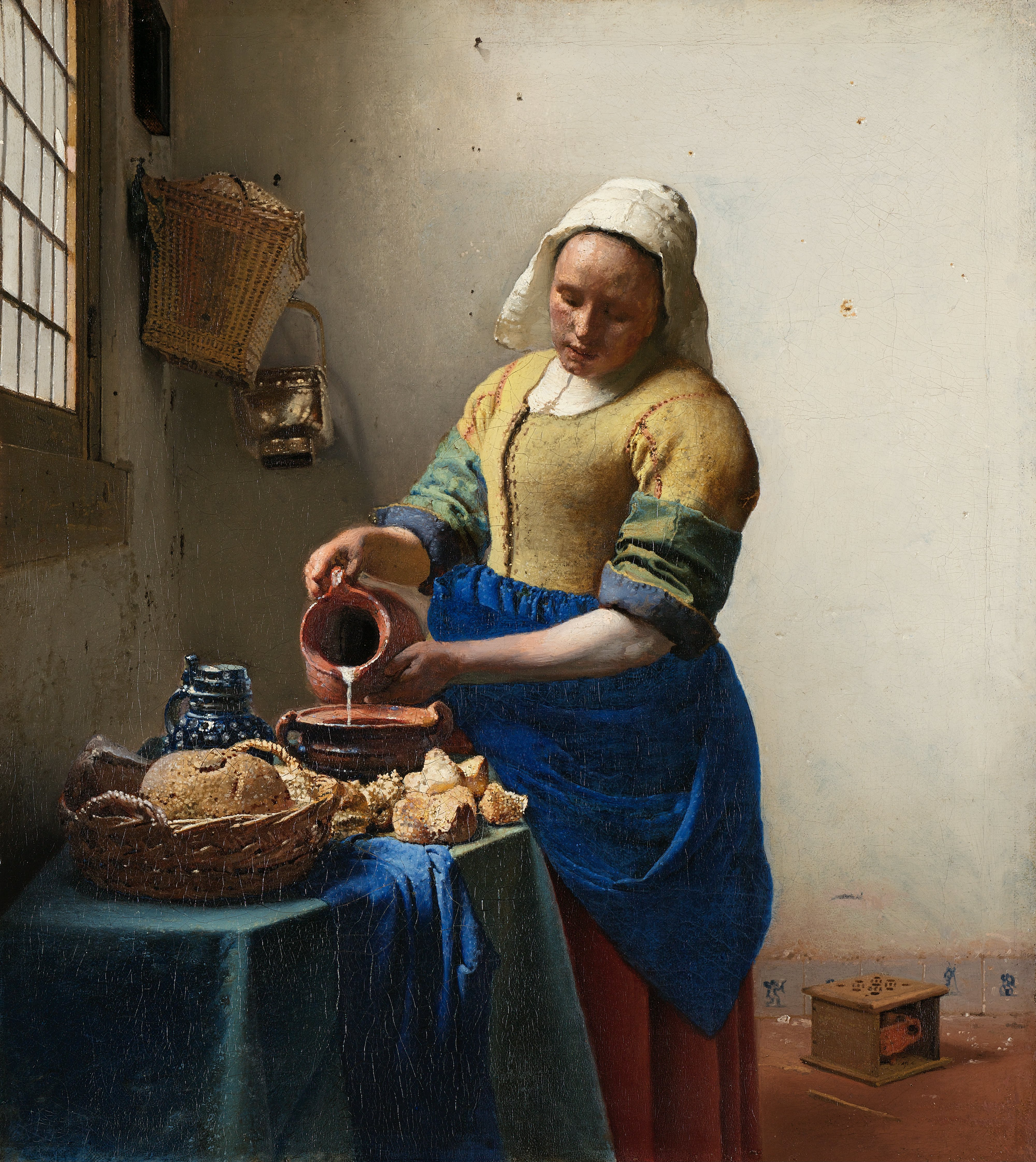
Johannes Vermeer, c. 1660

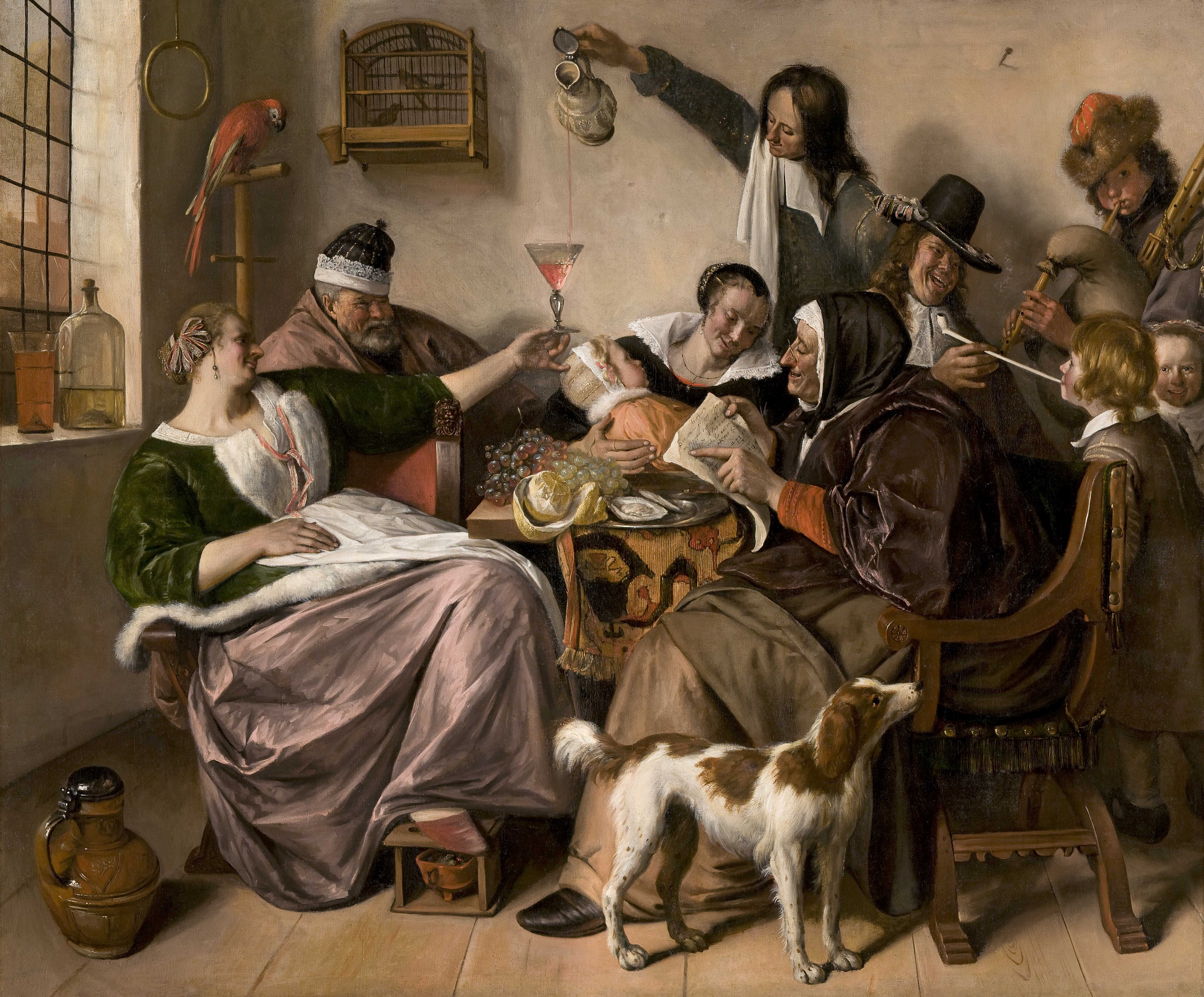
Jan Steen, c. 1665

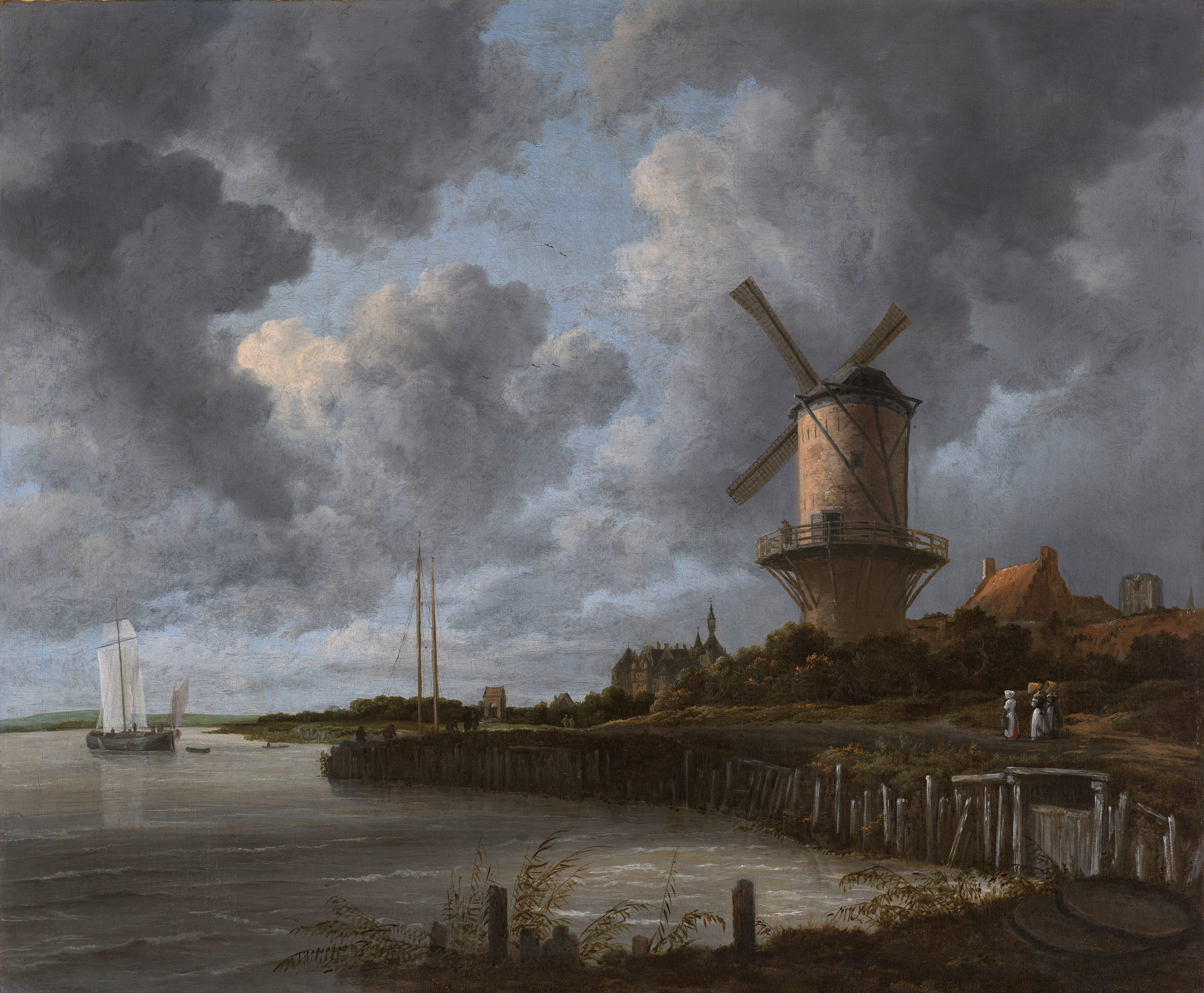
Jacob van Ruisdael, 1670

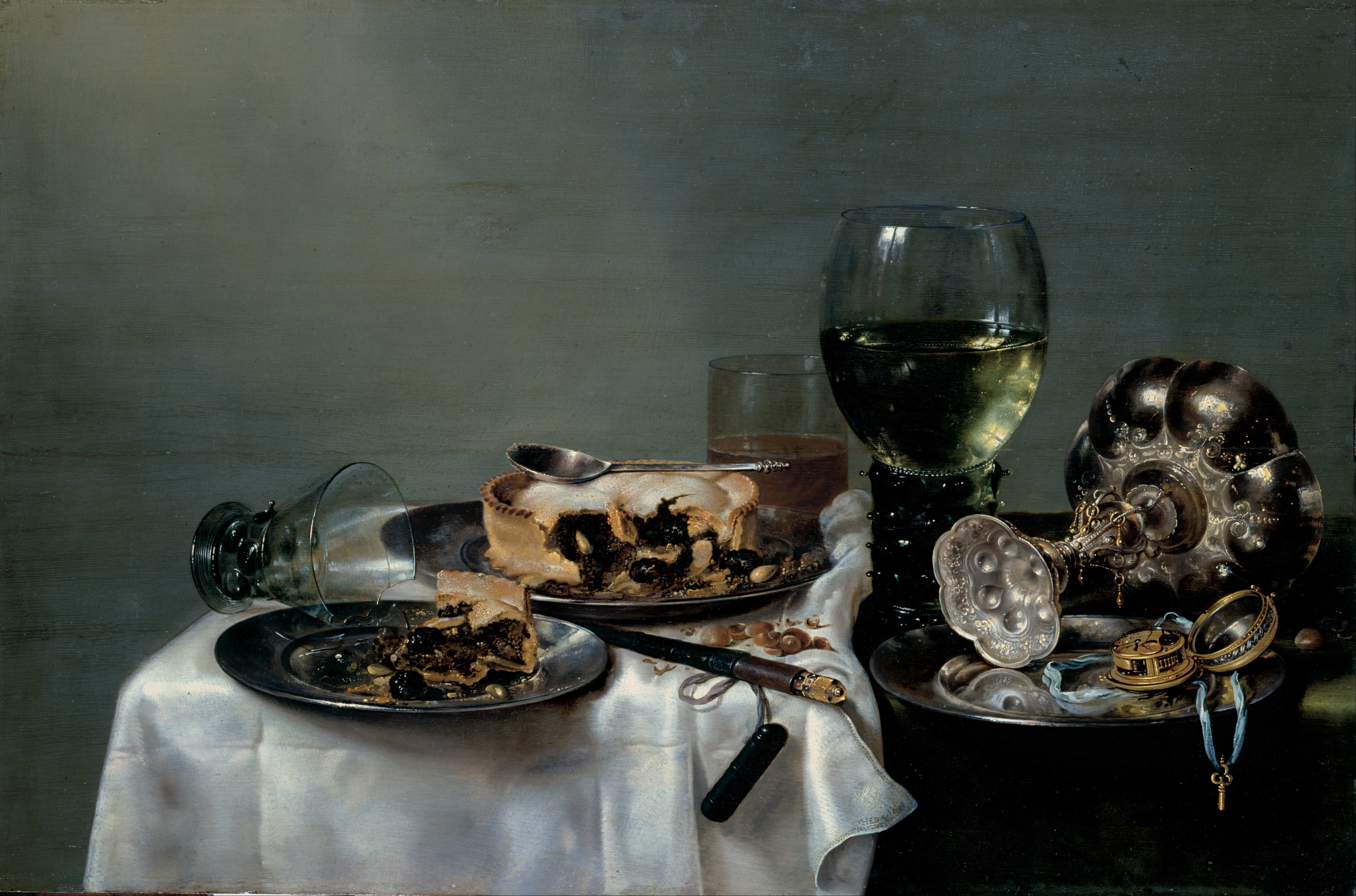
Willem Claesz. Heda, 1631

Diego Velázquez, 1656–1657

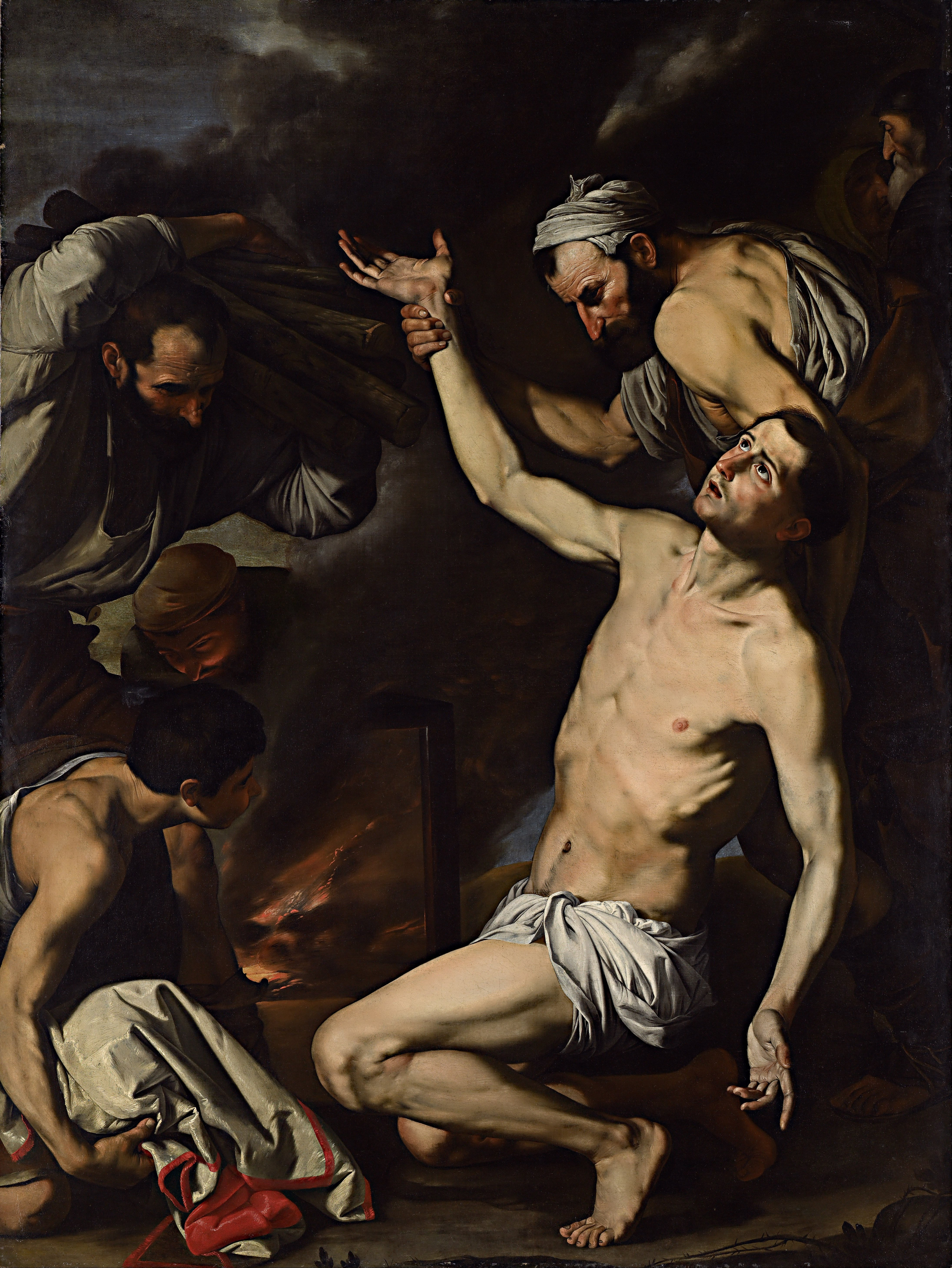
Jusepe de Ribera, 1620–1624

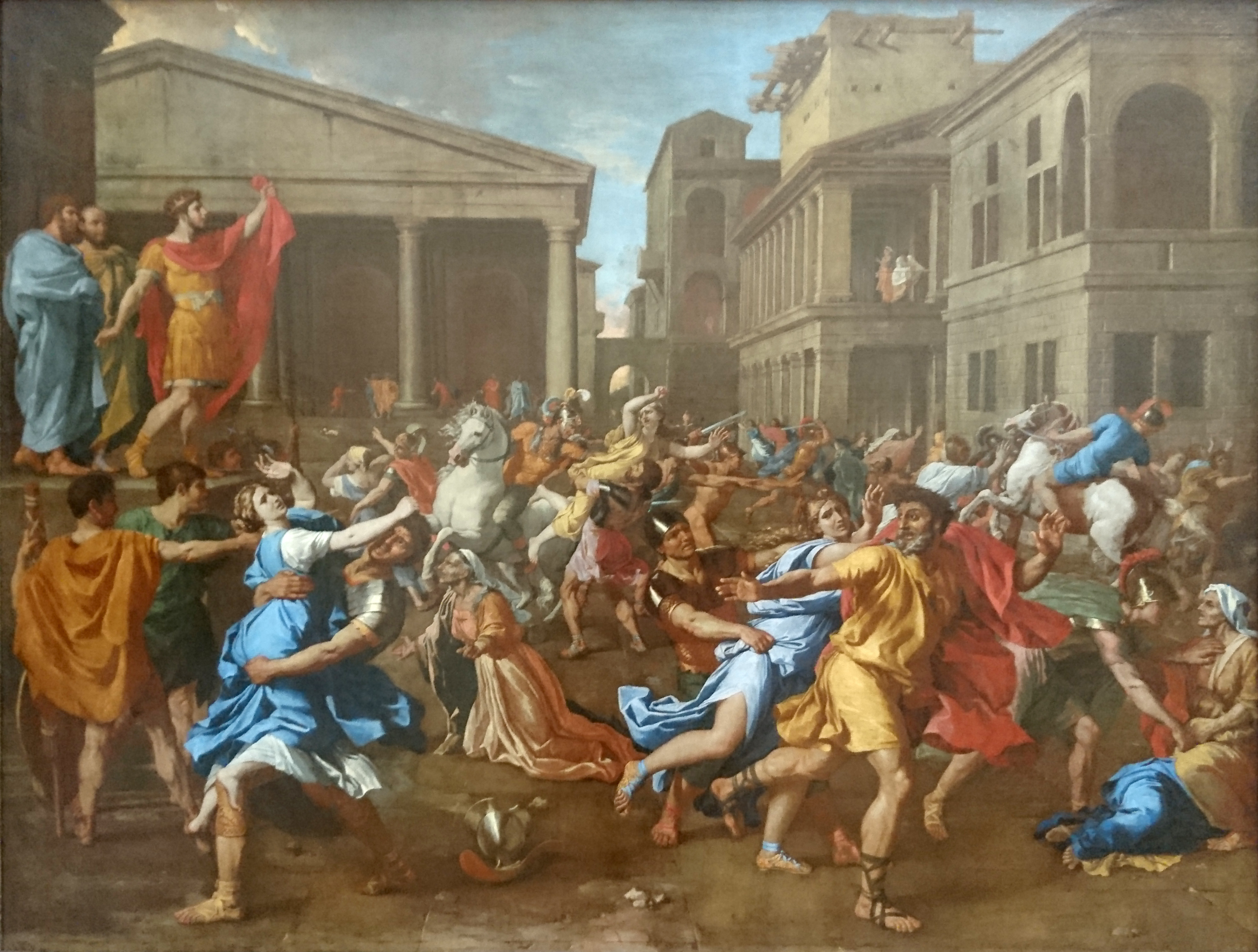
Nicolas Poussin, c. 1637–1638

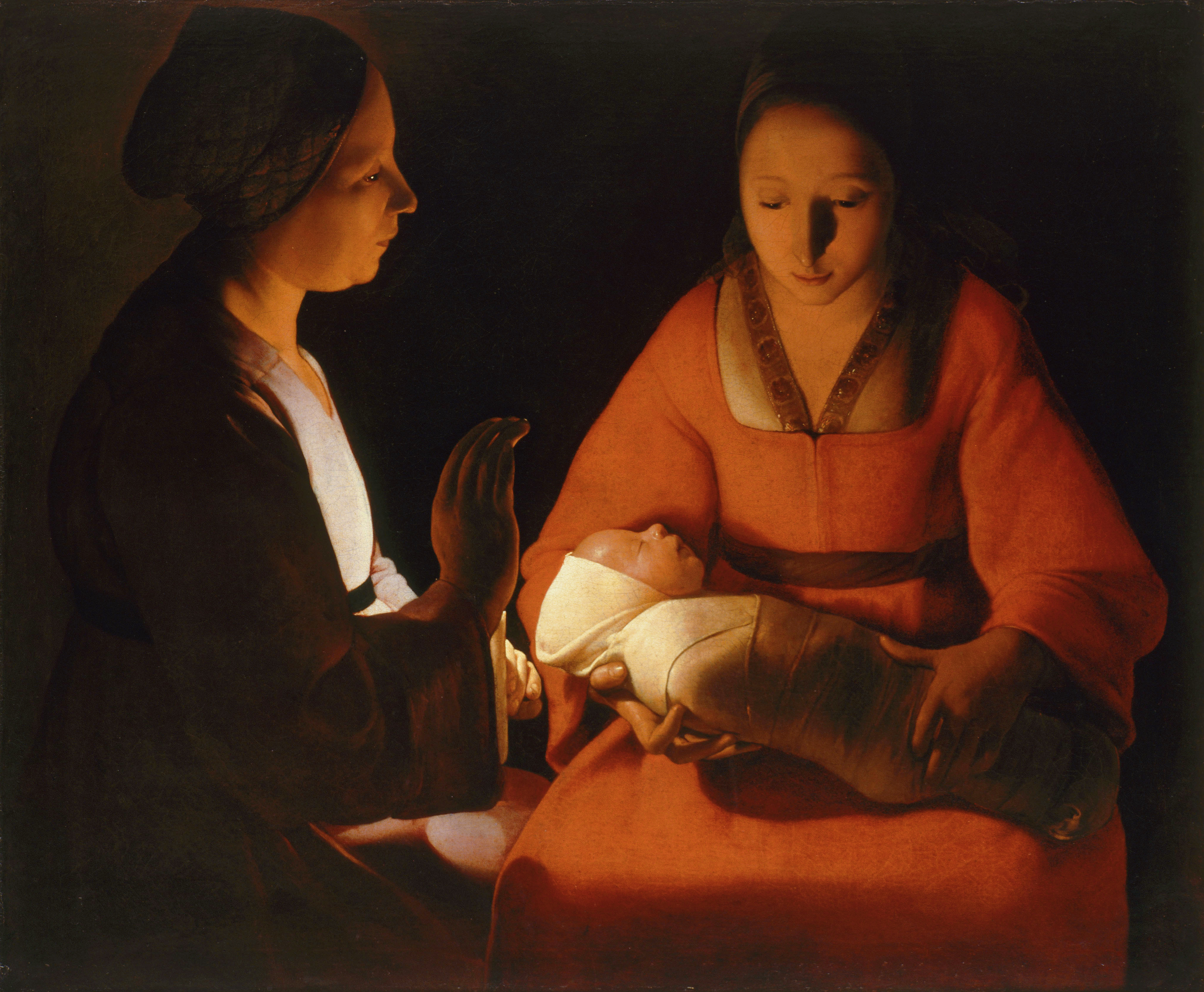
Georges de La Tour, 1640s

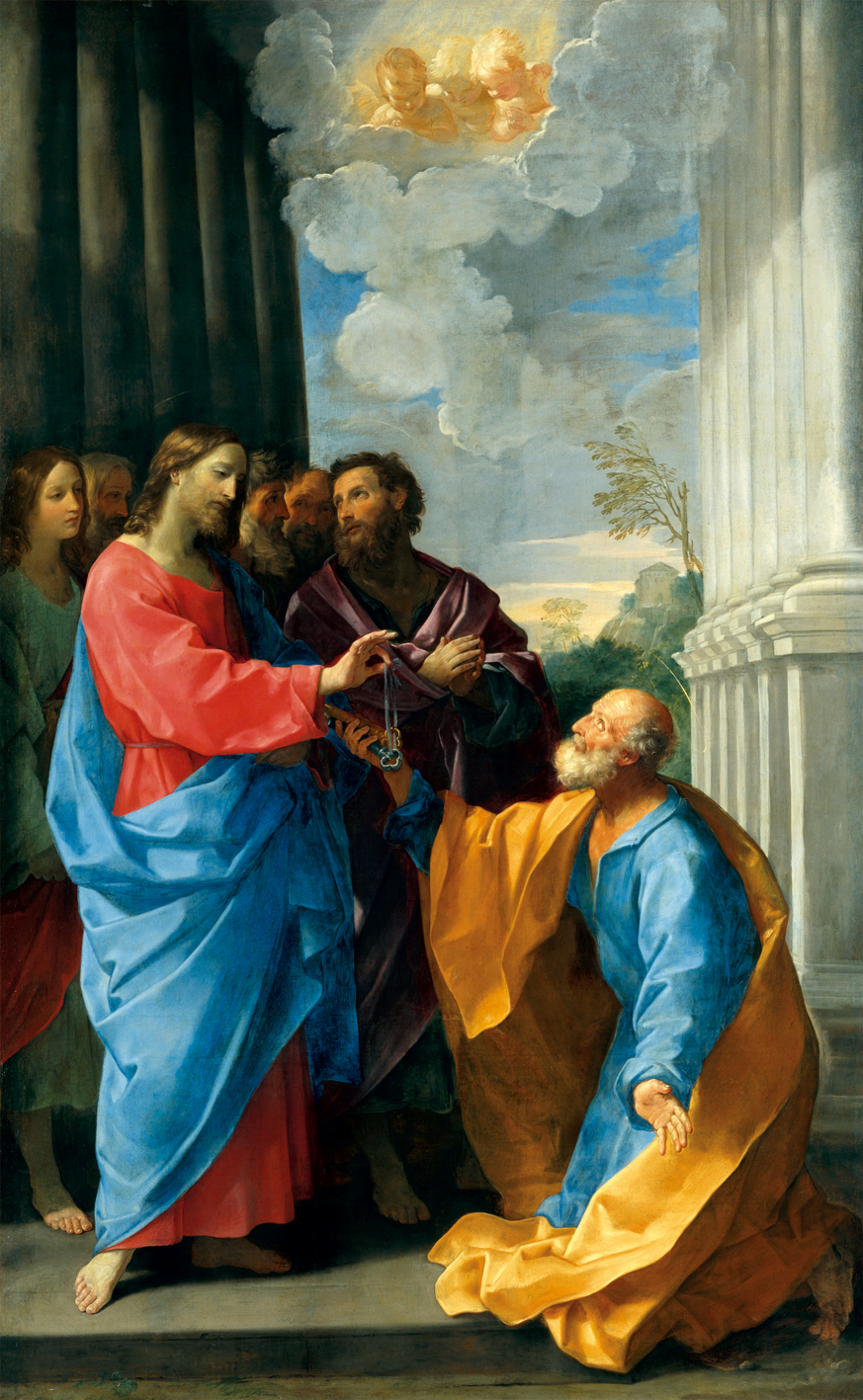
Guido Reni, 1625

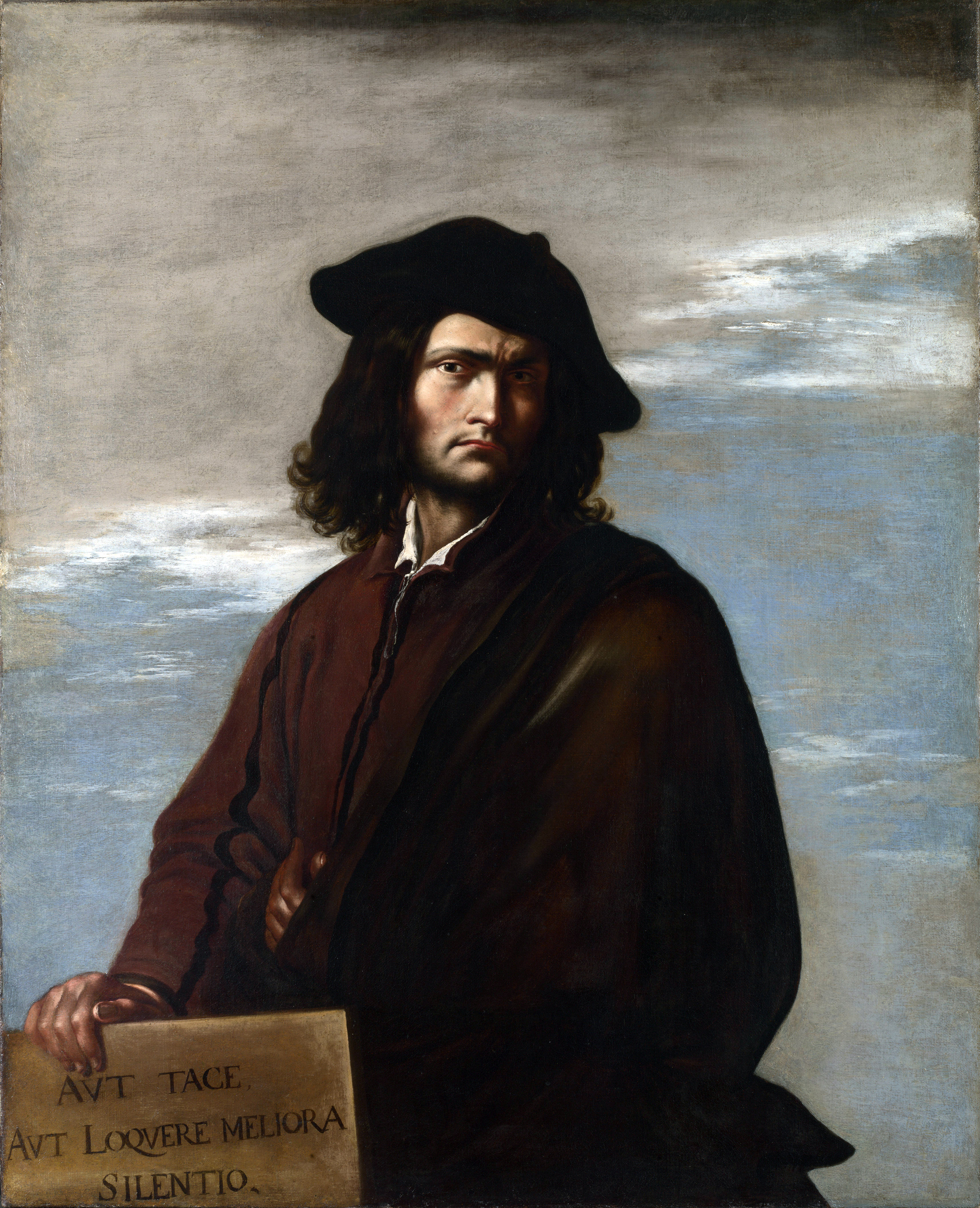
Salvator Rosa, c. 1645

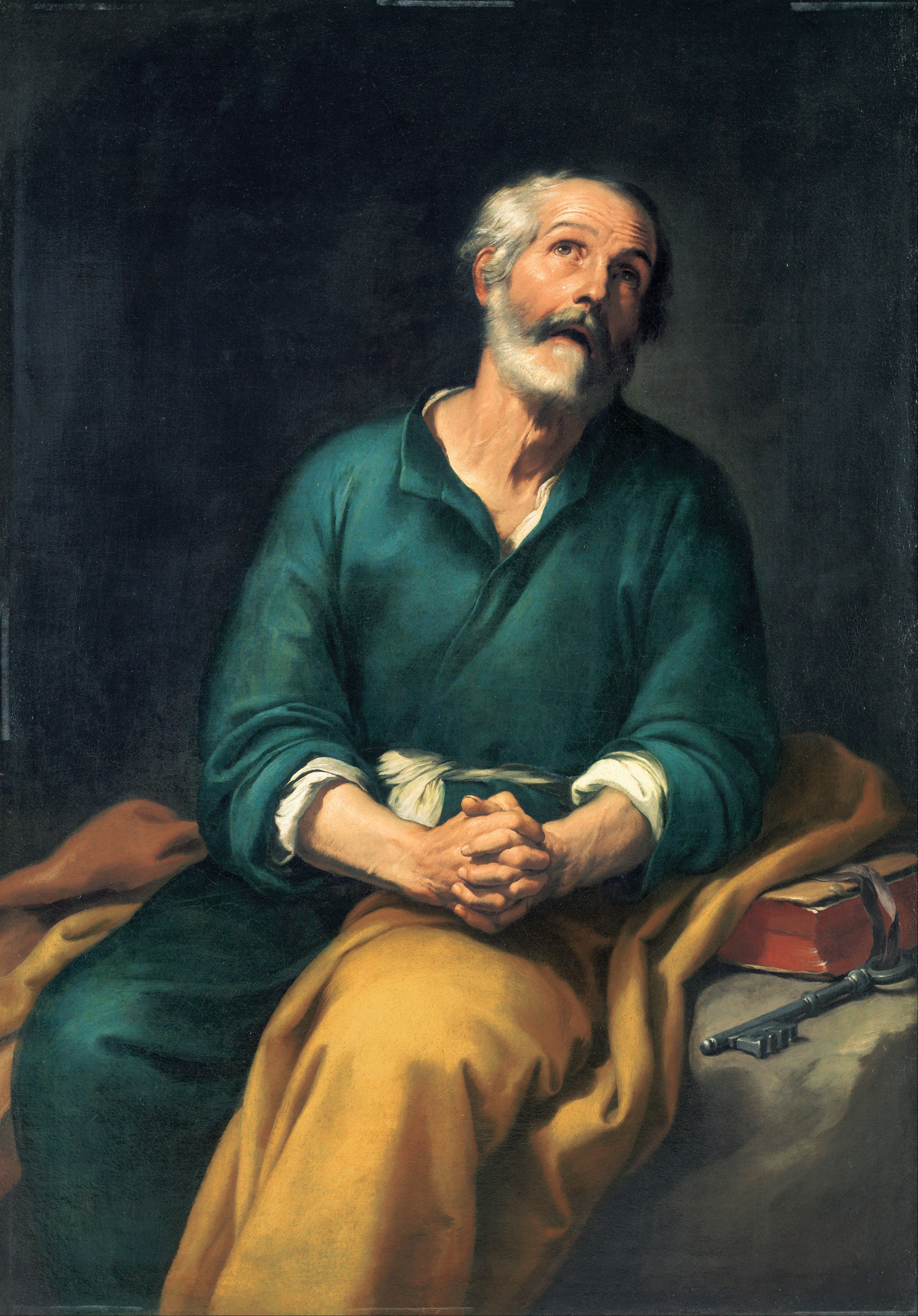
Bartolomé Esteban Murillo, c. 1650–1655

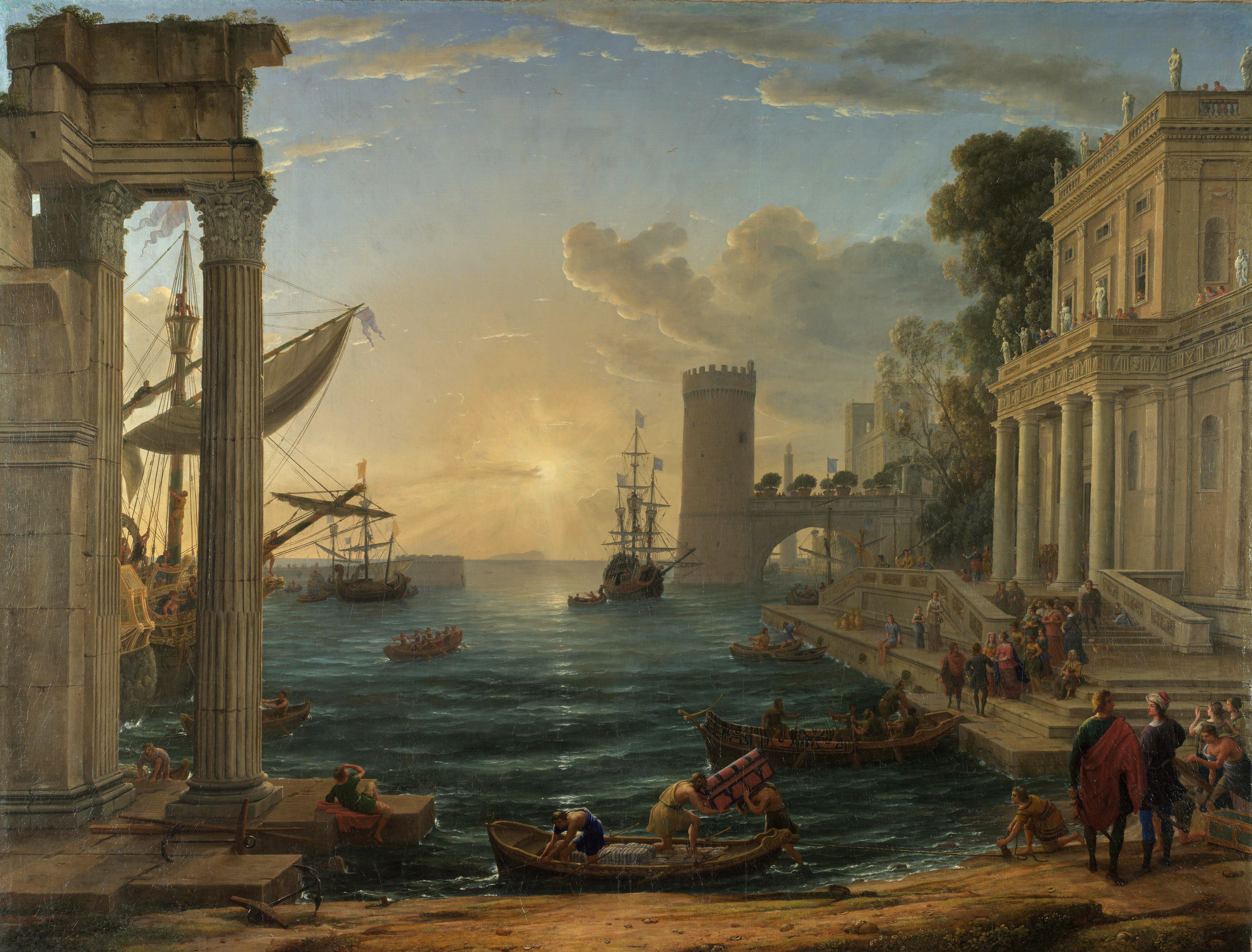
Claude Lorrain, 1648

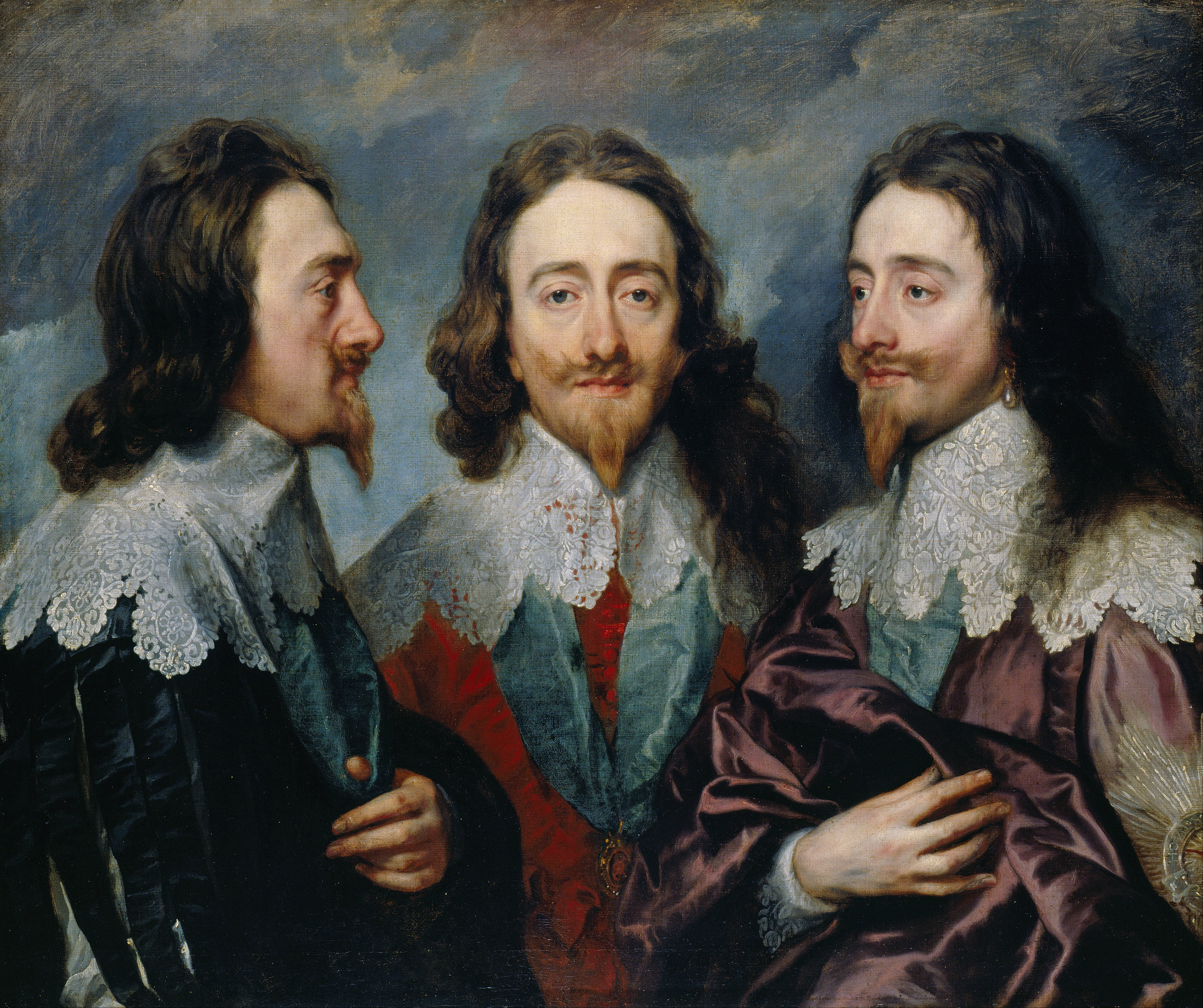
Anthony van Dyck, 1635–1636

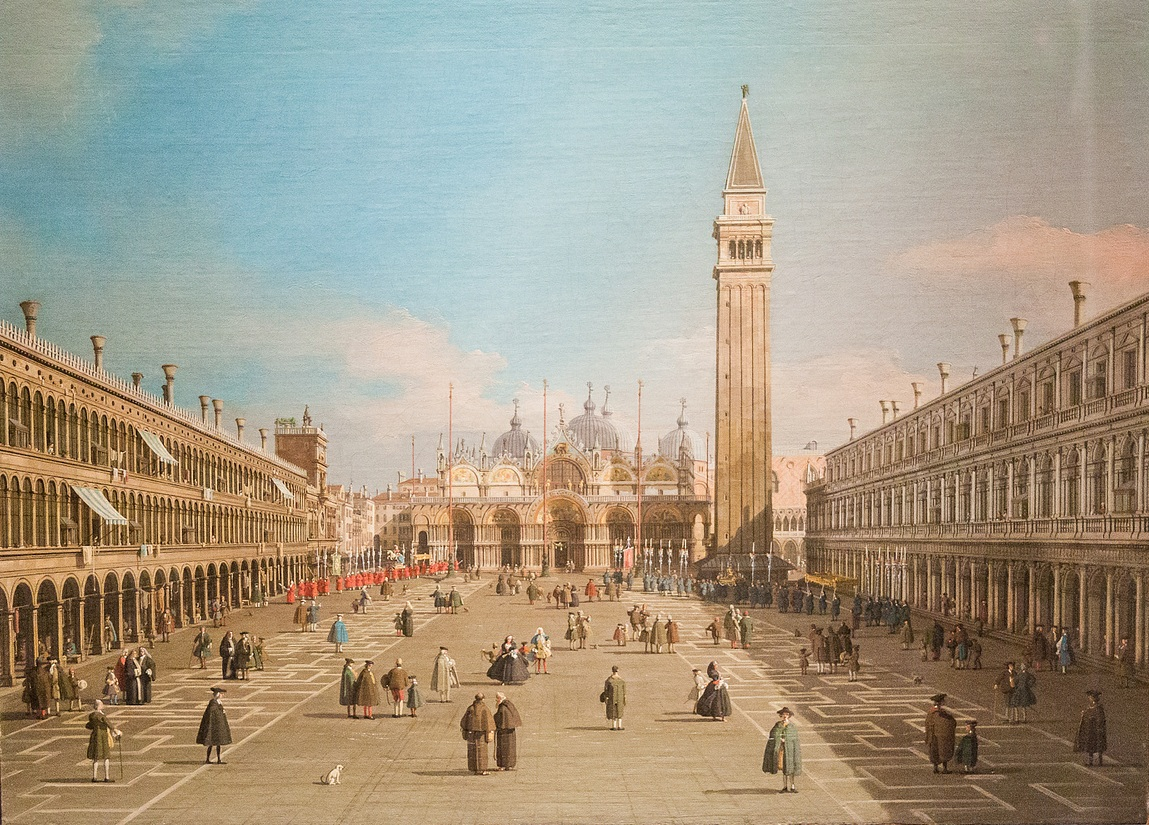
Canaletto, 1723

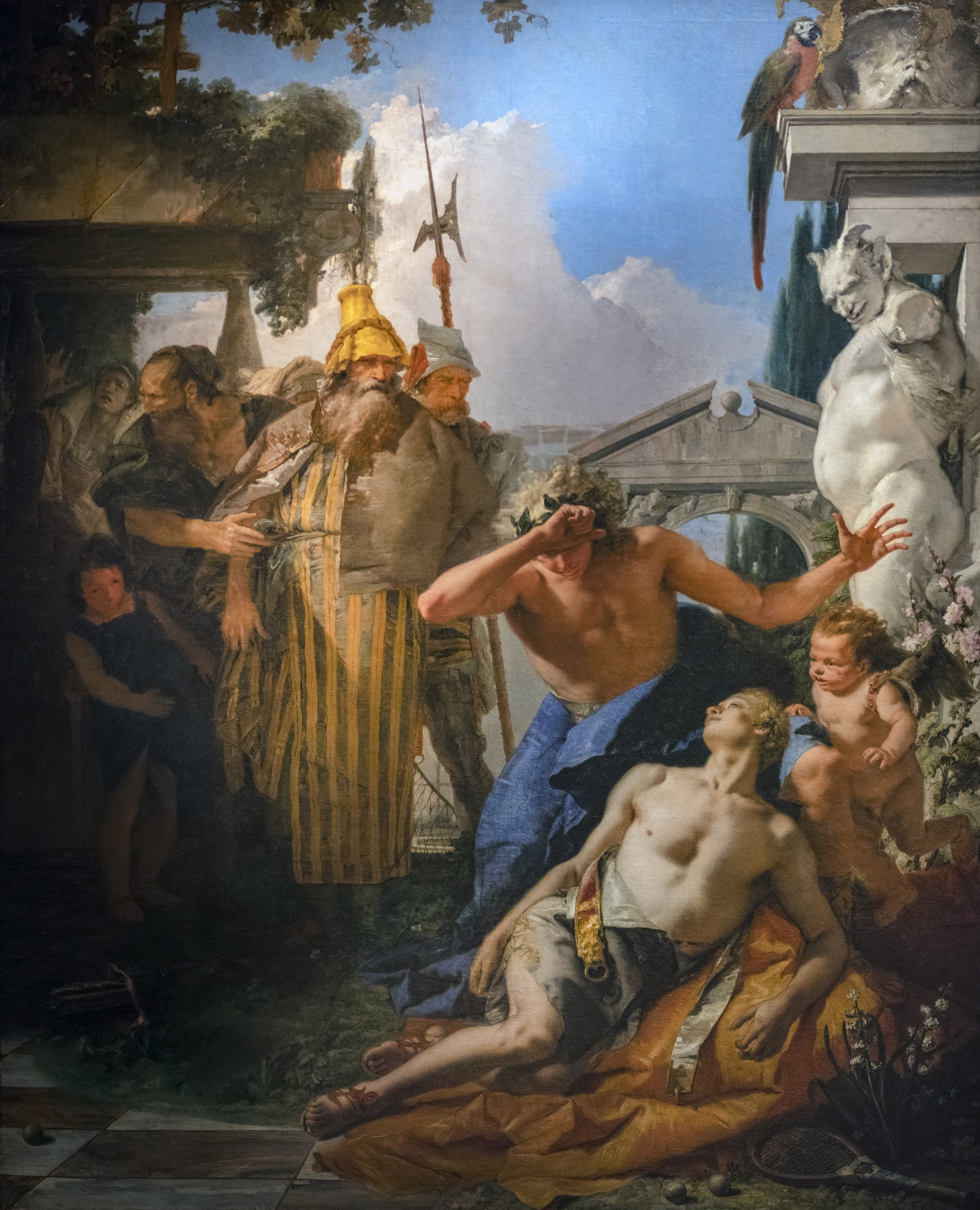
Giovanni Battista Tiepolo, c. 1752–1753

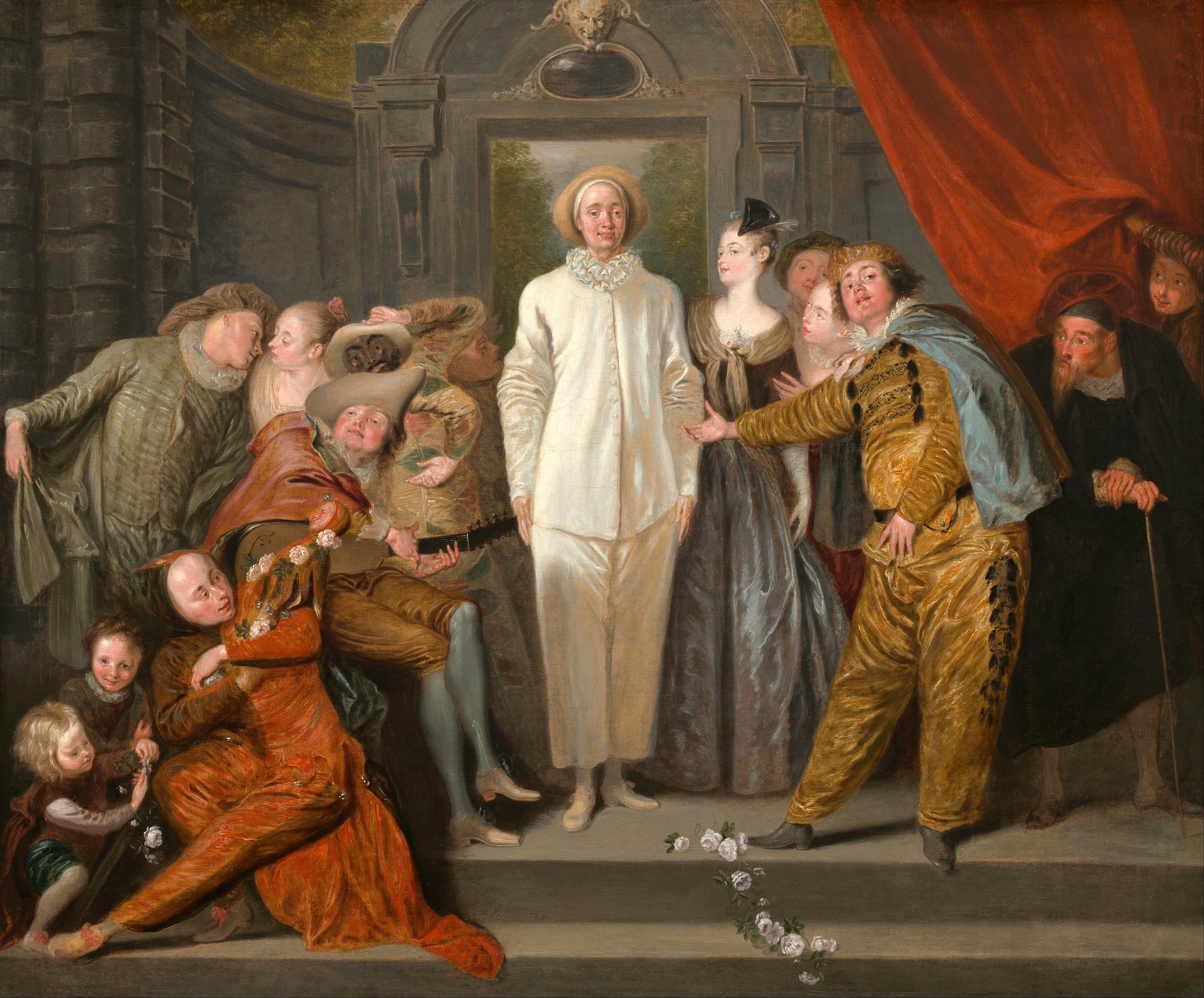
Antoine Watteau, c. 1720

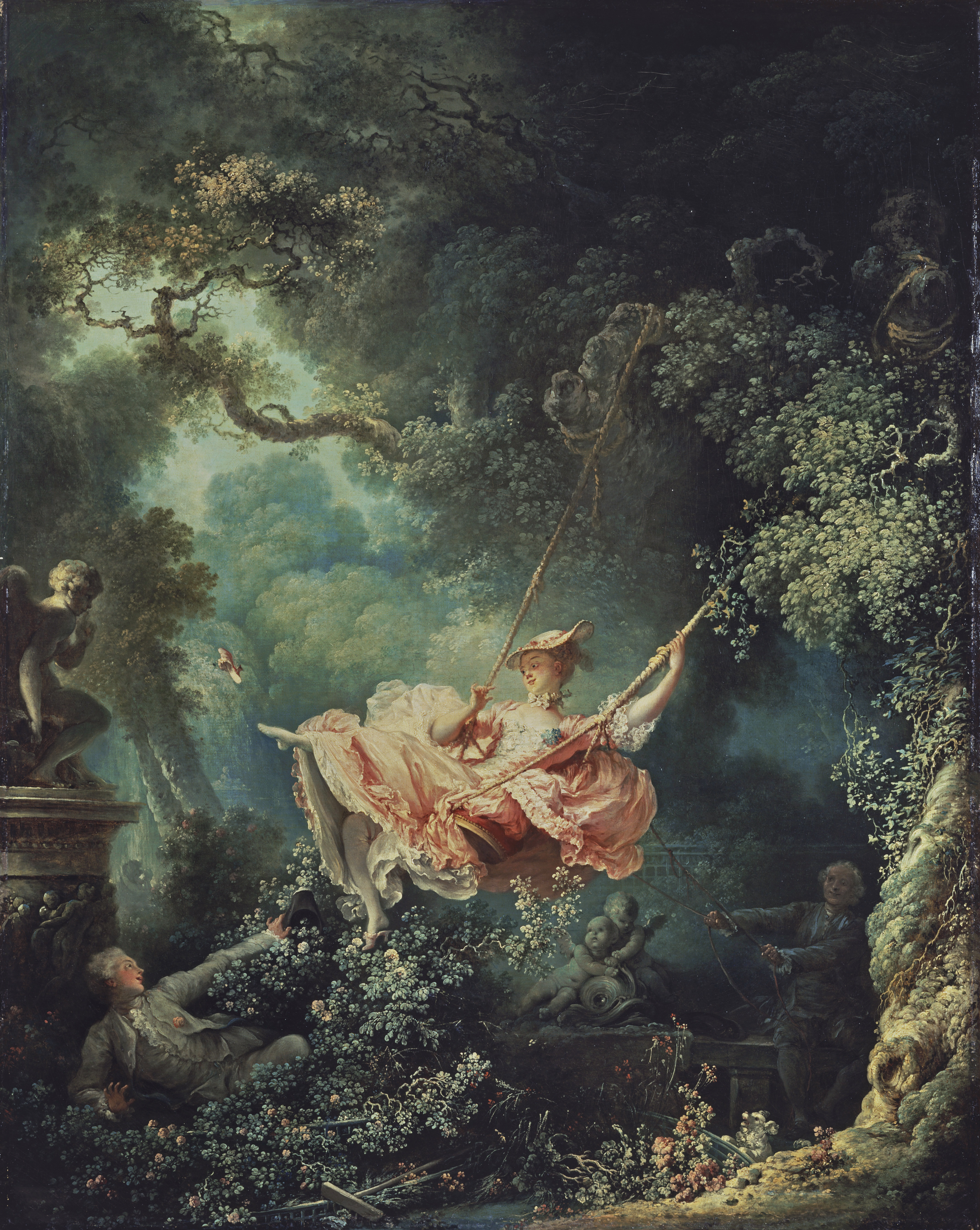
Jean-Honoré Fragonard, c. 1767–1768

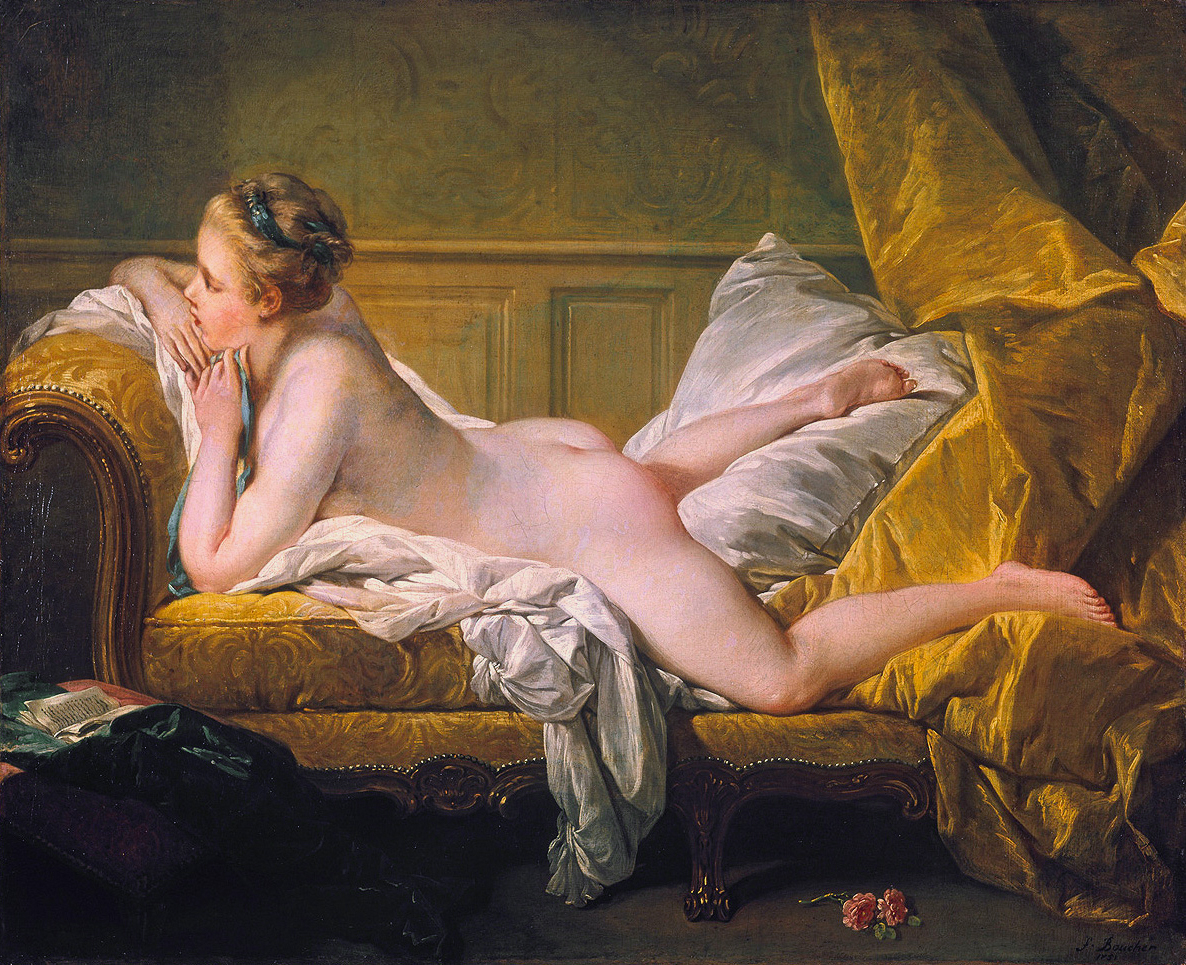
François Boucher, 1751

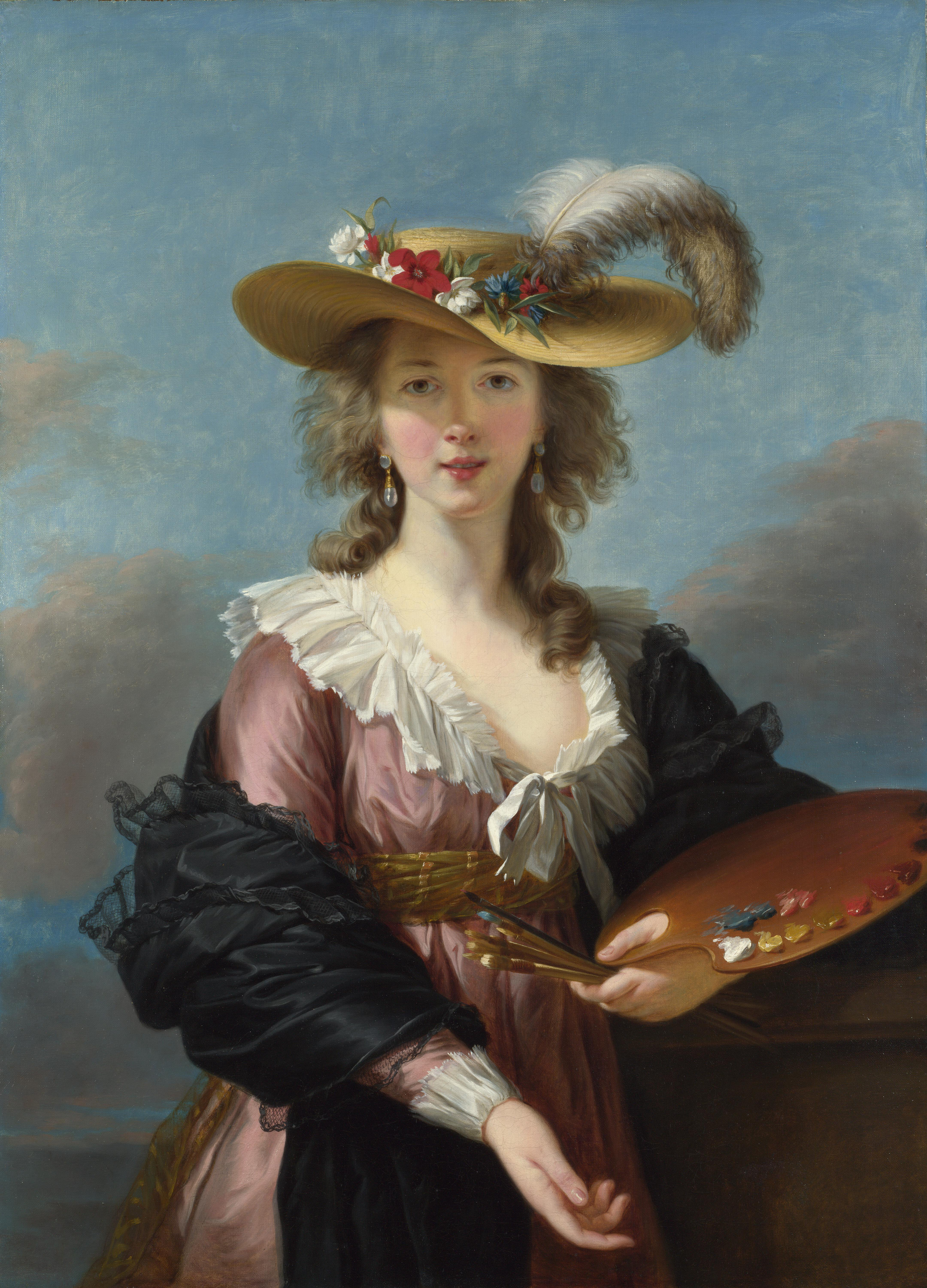
Élisabeth Louise Vigée-Le Brun, after 1782

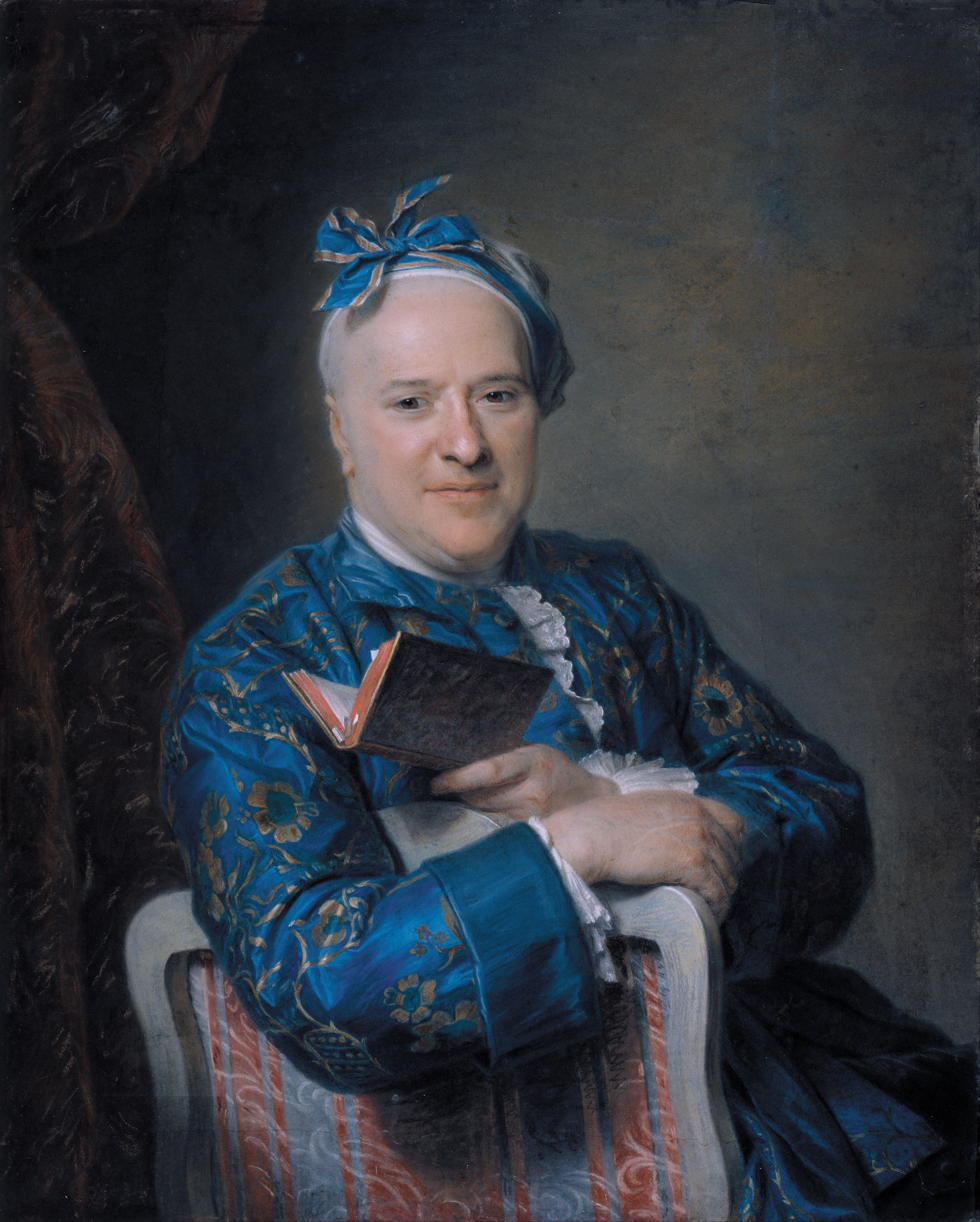
Maurice Quentin de La Tour, c. 1761

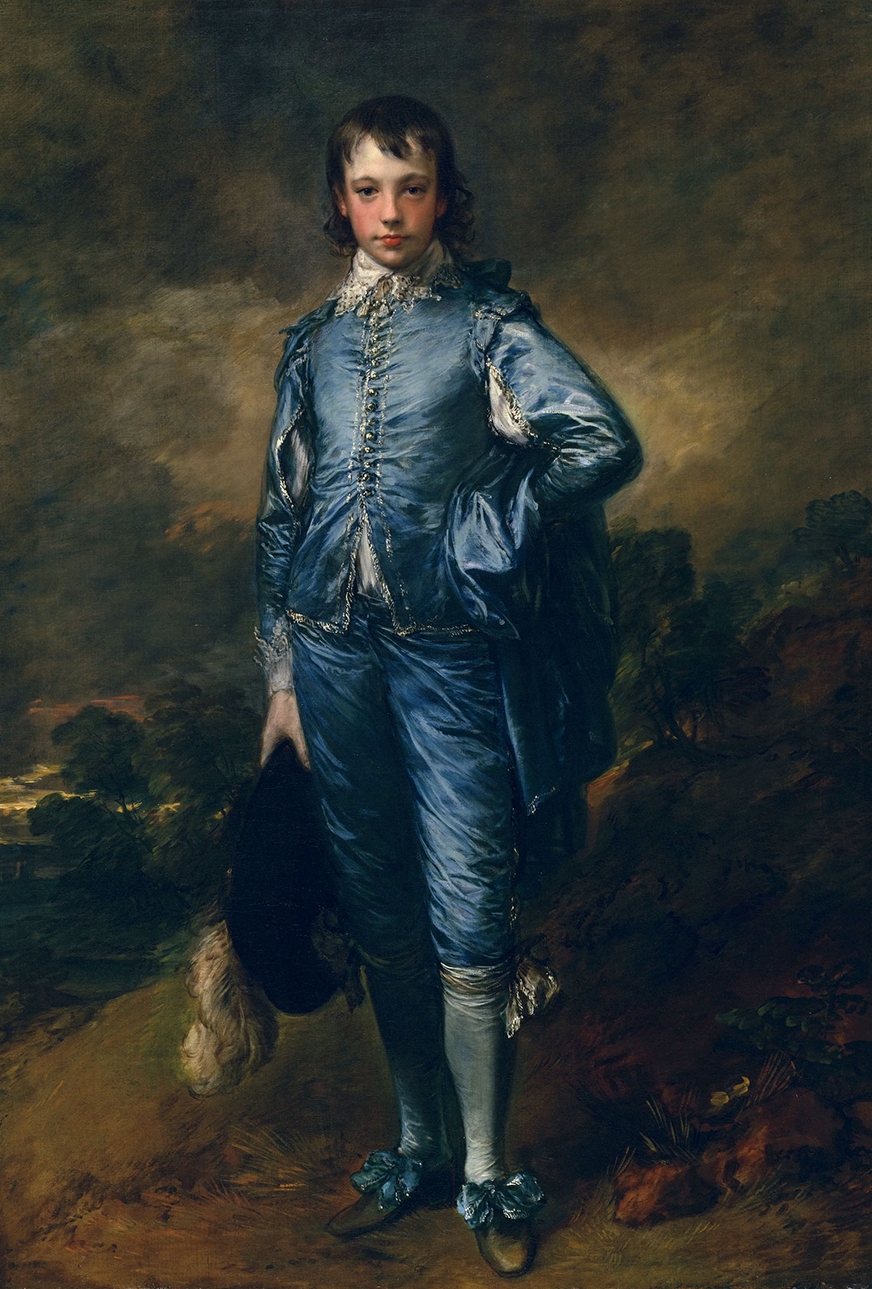
Thomas Gainsborough, c. 1770

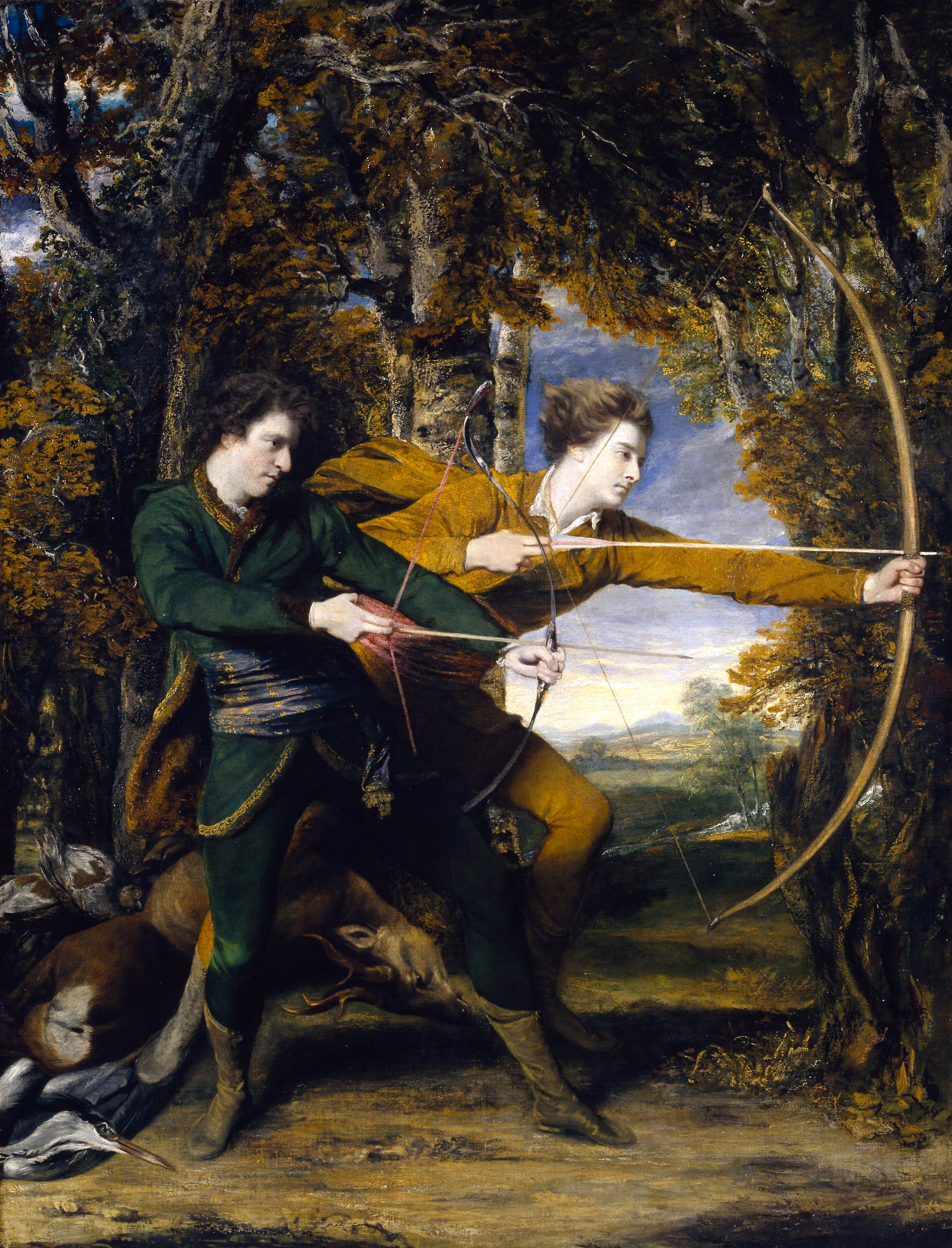
Joshua Reynolds, 1769

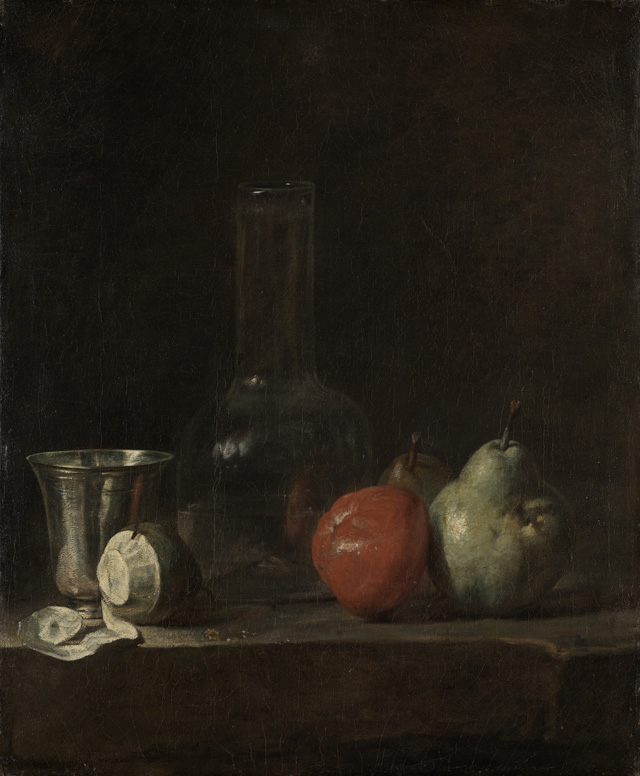
Jean-Baptiste-Siméon Chardin, c. 1728

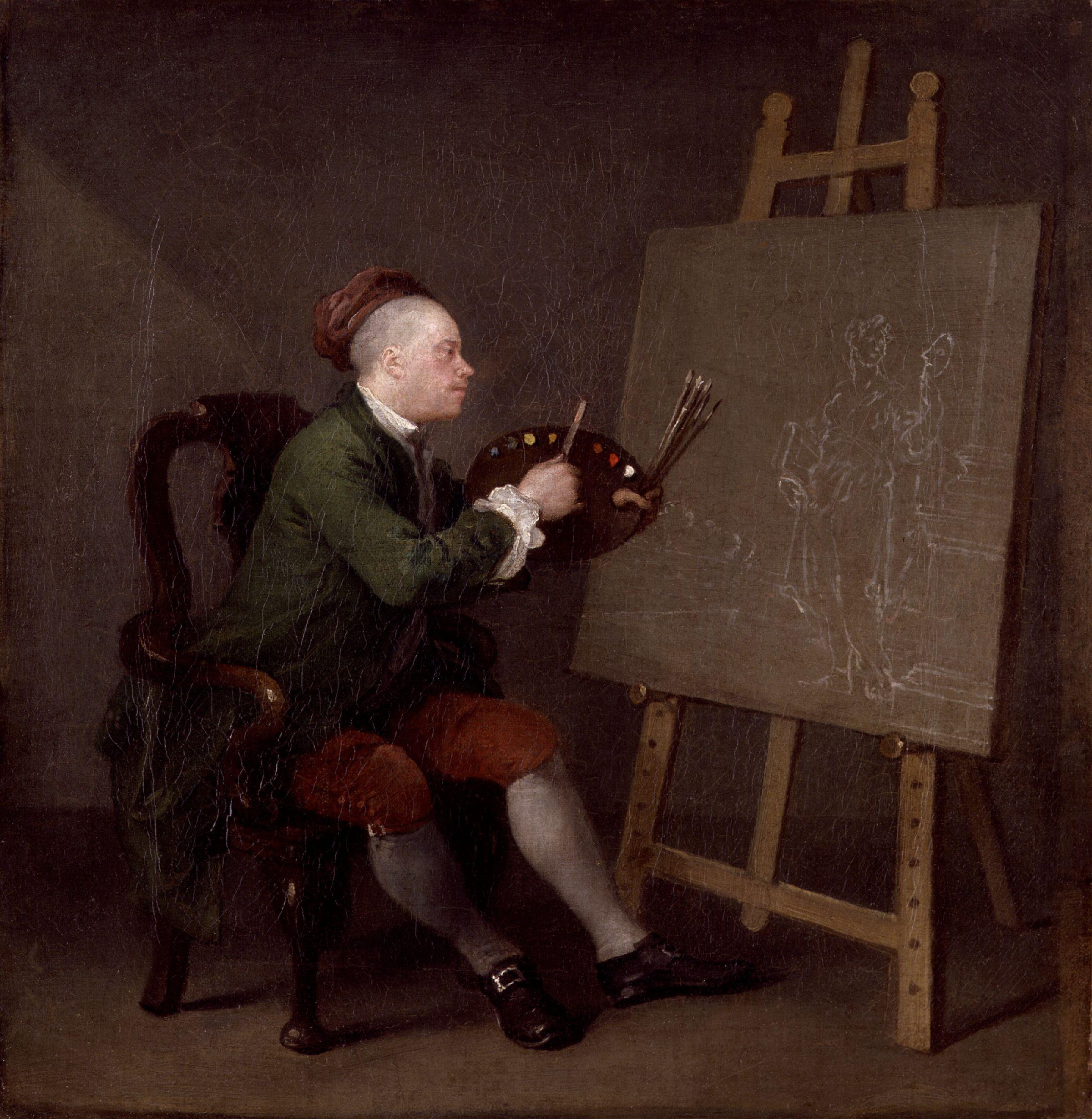
William Hogarth, c. 1757

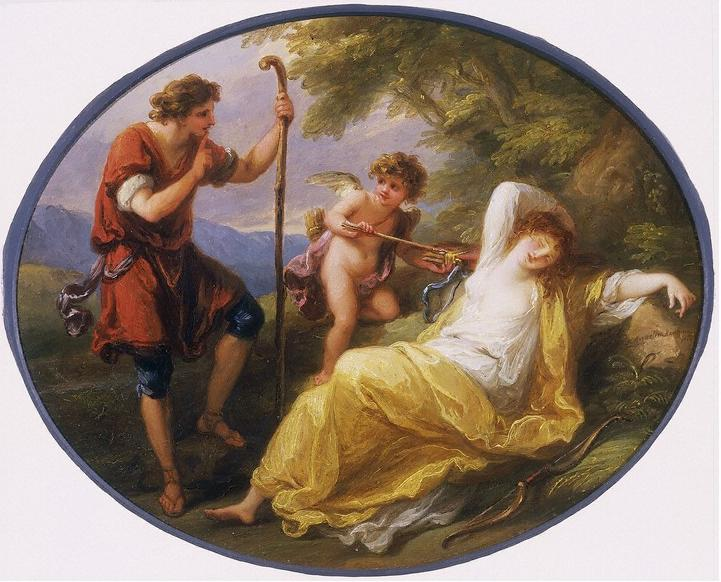
Angelica Kauffman, c. 1780

=== 19th century: Neo-classicism, History painting, Romanticism, Impressionism, Post-Impressionism, Symbolism ===
After Rococo there arose in the late 18th century, in architecture, and then in painting severe neo-classicism, best represented by such artists as David and his heir Ingres. Ingres' work already contains much of the sensuality, but none of the spontaneity, that was to characterize Romanticism.

This movement turned its attention toward landscape and nature as well as the human figure and the supremacy of natural order above mankind's will. There is opposition to Enlightenment ideals, as humanity is seen being at the whim of nature's chaos. The idea that human beings are not above the forces of Nature is in contradiction to Ancient Greek and Renaissance ideals where mankind was above all things and owned his fate. This thinking led romantic artists to depict the sublime, ruined churches, shipwrecks, massacres and madness.

By the mid-19th-century painters became liberated from the demands of their patronage to only depict scenes from religion, mythology, portraiture or history. The idea "art for art's sake" began to find expression in the work of painters like Francisco de Goya, John Constable, and J.M.W. Turner. Romantic painters saw landscape painting as an important genre to express the vanity of mankind in opposition to the grandeur of nature. Until then, landscape painting wasn't considered the most important genre for painters (like portraiture or history painting). But painters like J.M.W. Turner and Caspar David Friedrich managed to elevate landscape painting to an eminence rivalling history painting. Some of the major painters of this period are Eugène Delacroix, Théodore Géricault, J. M. W. Turner, Caspar David Friedrich and John Constable. Francisco de Goya's late work demonstrates the Romantic interest in the irrational, while the work of Arnold Böcklin evokes mystery and the paintings of Aesthetic movement artist James McNeill Whistler evoke both sophistication and decadence.In the United States the Romantic tradition of landscape painting was known as the Hudson River School: exponents include Thomas Cole, Frederic Edwin Church, Albert Bierstadt, Thomas Moran, and John Frederick Kensett. Luminism was a movement in American landscape painting related to the Hudson River School. The National Gallery of Art's landmark 1980 exhibition American Light: The Luminist Movement, 1825-1875 included many artists now primarily associated with the Hudson River School, such as Frederic Edwin Church.

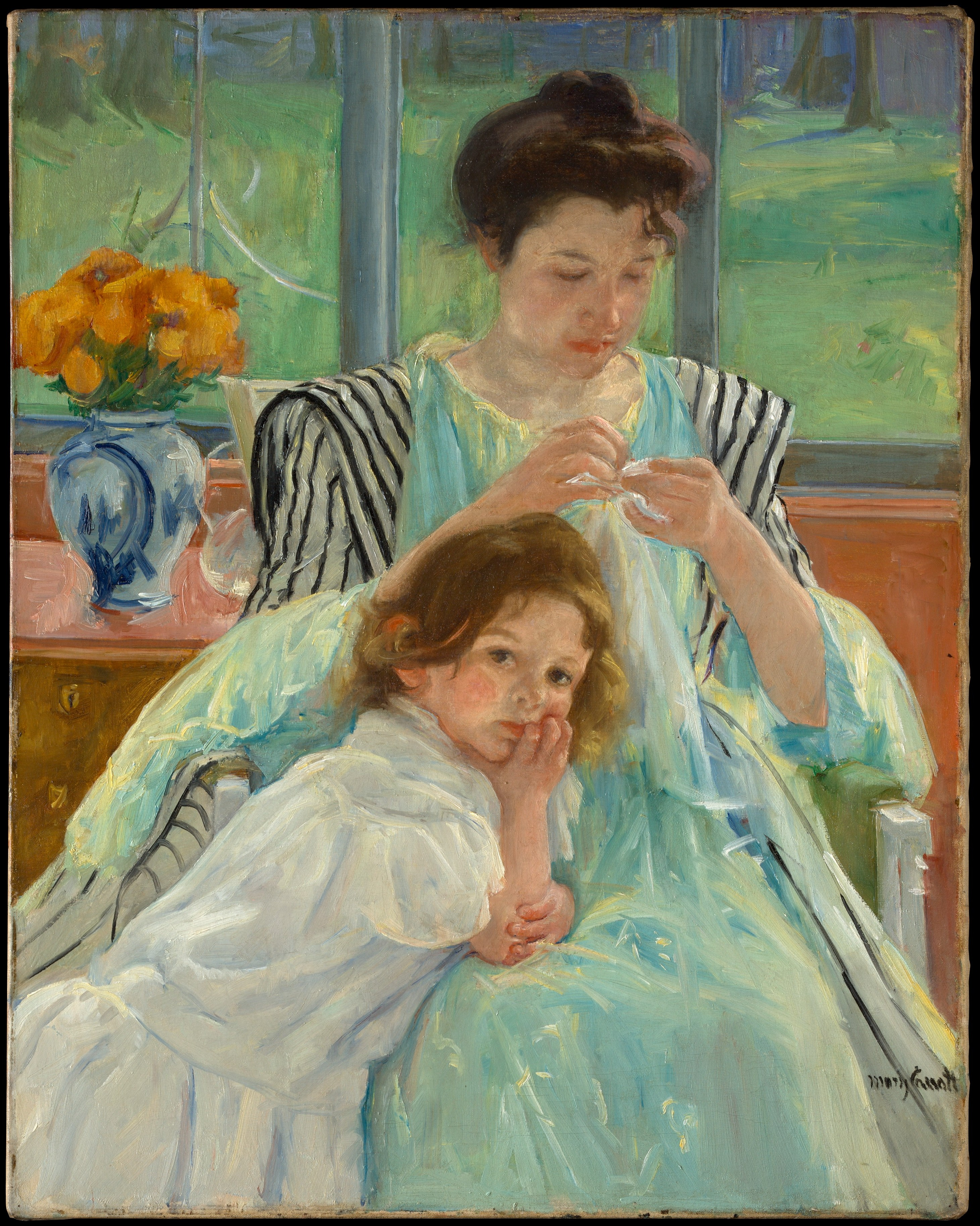
Young Mother Sewing, Mary Cassatt

The leading Barbizon School painter Camille Corot painted in both a romantic and a realistic vein; his work prefigures Impressionism, as does the paintings of Eugène Boudin who was one of the first French landscape painters to paint outdoors. Boudin was also an important influence on the young Claude Monet, whom in 1857 he introduced to Plein air painting. A major force in the turn towards Realism at mid-century was Gustave Courbet. In the latter third of the century Impressionists like Édouard Manet, Claude Monet, Pierre-Auguste Renoir, Camille Pissarro, Alfred Sisley, Berthe Morisot, Mary Cassatt, and Edgar Degas worked in a more direct approach than had previously been exhibited publicly. They eschewed allegory and narrative in favor of individualized responses to the modern world, sometimes painted with little or no preparatory study, relying on deftness of drawing and a highly chromatic pallette. Manet, Degas, Renoir, Morisot, and Cassatt concentrated primarily on the human subject. Both Manet and Degas reinterpreted classical figurative canons within contemporary situations; in Manet's case the re-imaginings met with hostile public reception. Renoir, Morisot, and Cassatt turned to domestic life for inspiration, with Renoir focusing on the female nude. Monet, Pissarro, and Sisley used the landscape as their primary motif, the transience of light and weather playing a major role in their work. While Sisley most closely adhered to the original principals of the Impressionist perception of the landscape, Monet sought challenges in increasingly chromatic and changeable conditions, culminating in his series of monumental works of Water Lilies painted in Giverny.

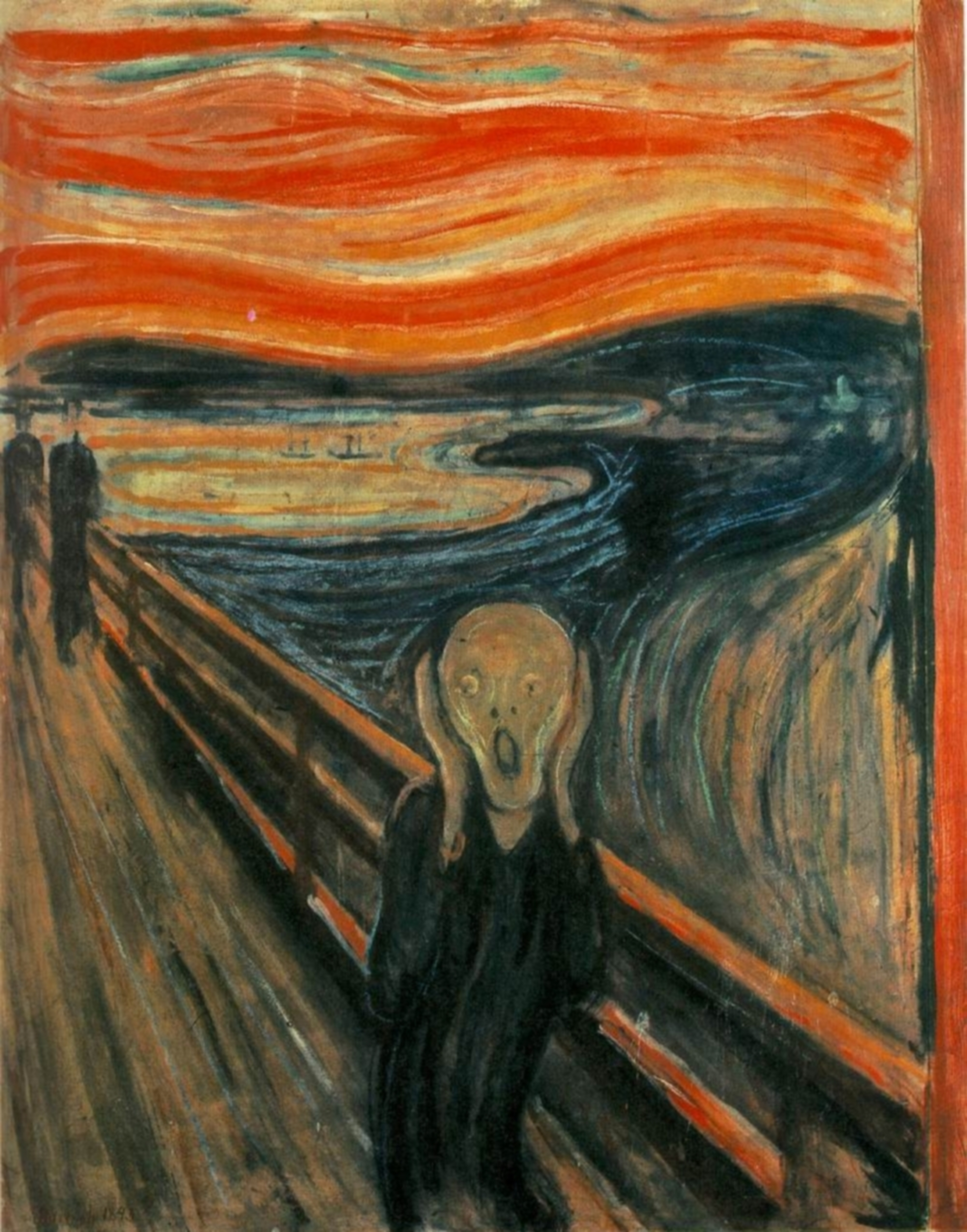
Edvard Munch, 1893, early example of Expressionism

Pissarro adopted some of the experiments of Post-Impressionism. Slightly younger Post-Impressionists like Vincent van Gogh, Paul Gauguin, and Georges Seurat, along with Paul Cézanne led art to the edge of modernism; for Gauguin Impressionism gave way to a personal symbolism; Seurat transformed Impressionism's broken color into a scientific optical study, structured on frieze-like compositions; Van Gogh's turbulent method of paint application, coupled with a sonorous use of color, predicted Expressionism and Fauvism, and Cézanne, desiring to unite classical composition with a revolutionary abstraction of natural forms, would come to be seen as a precursor of 20th-century art. The spell of Impressionism was felt throughout the world, including in the United States, where it became integral to the painting of American Impressionists such as Childe Hassam, John Twachtman, and Theodore Robinson; and in Australia where painters of the Heidelberg School such as Arthur Streeton, Frederick McCubbin and Charles Conder painted en plein air and were particularly interested in the Australian landscape and light. It also exerted influence on painters who were not primarily Impressionistic in theory, like the portrait and landscape painter John Singer Sargent. At the same time in America at the turn of the 20th century there existed a native and nearly insular realism, as richly embodied in the figurative work of Thomas Eakins, the Ashcan School, and the landscapes and seascapes of Winslow Homer, all of whose paintings were deeply invested in the solidity of natural forms. The visionary landscape, a motive largely dependent on the ambiguity of the nocturne, found its advocates in Albert Pinkham Ryder and Ralph Albert Blakelock.

In the late 19th century there also were several, rather dissimilar, groups of Symbolist painters whose works resonated with younger artists of the 20th century, especially with the Fauvists and the Surrealists. Among them were Gustave Moreau, Odilon Redon, Pierre Puvis de Chavannes, Henri Fantin-Latour, Arnold Böcklin, Edvard Munch, Félicien Rops, and Jan Toorop, and Gustav Klimt amongst others including the Russian Symbolists like Mikhail Vrubel.

Symbolist painters mined mythology and dream imagery for a visual language of the soul, seeking evocative paintings that brought to mind a static world of silence. The symbols used in Symbolism are not the familiar emblems of mainstream iconography but intensely personal, private, obscure and ambiguous references. More a philosophy than an actual style of art, the Symbolist painters influenced the contemporary Art Nouveau movement and Les Nabis. In their exploration of dreamlike subjects, symbolist painters are found across centuries and cultures, as they are still today; Bernard Delvaille has described René Magritte's surrealism as "Symbolism plus Freud".

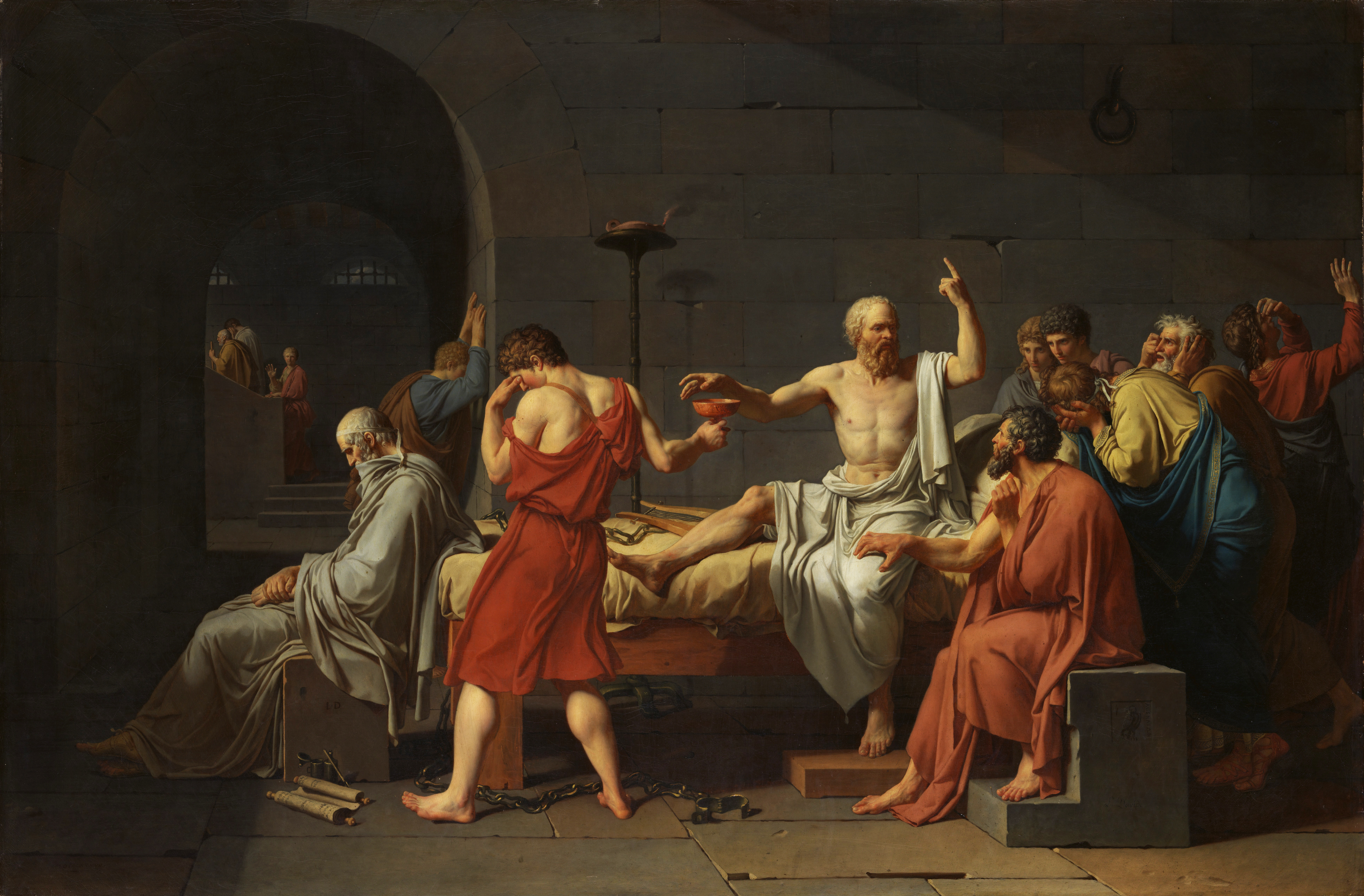
Jacques-Louis David 1787

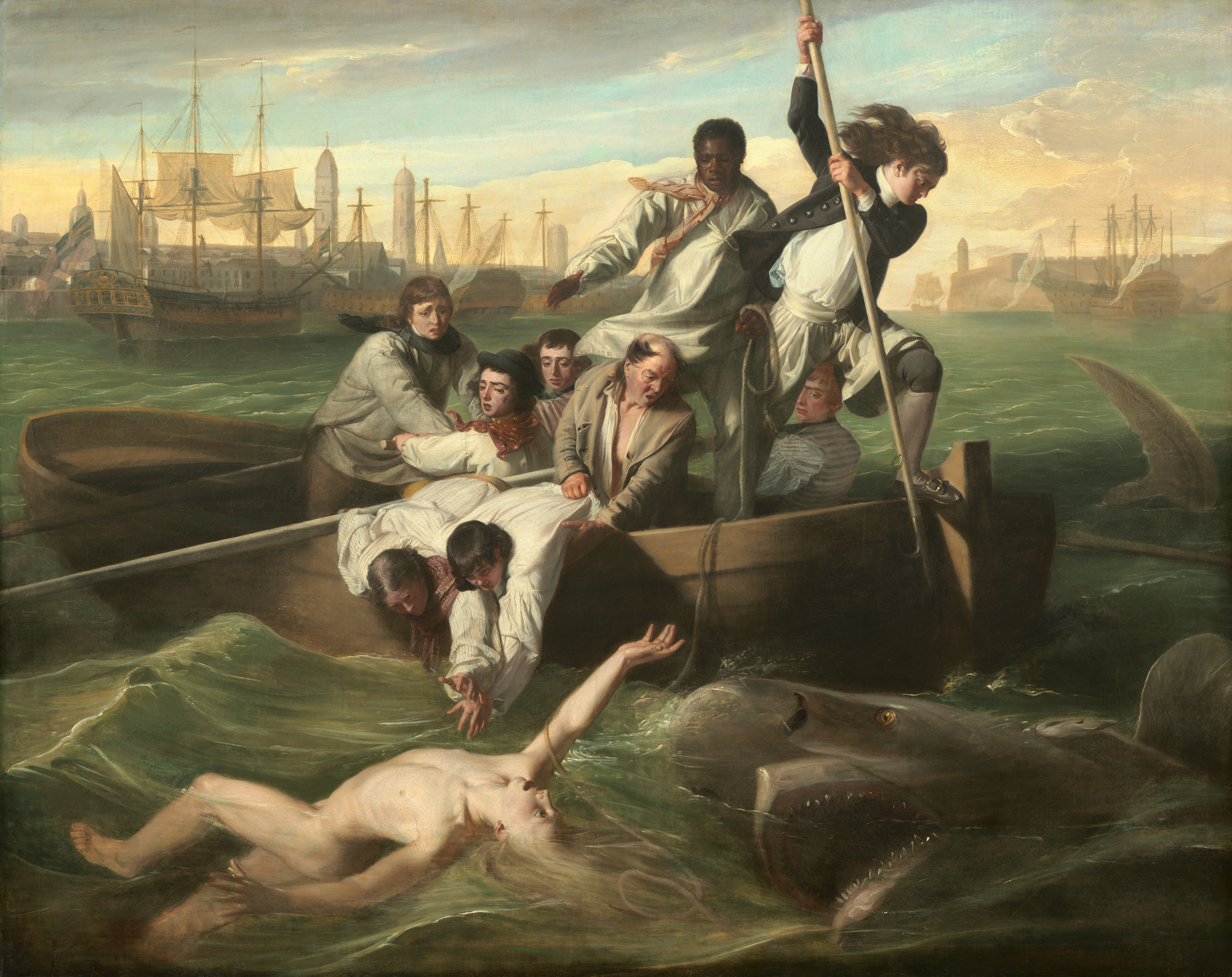
John Singleton Copley 1778

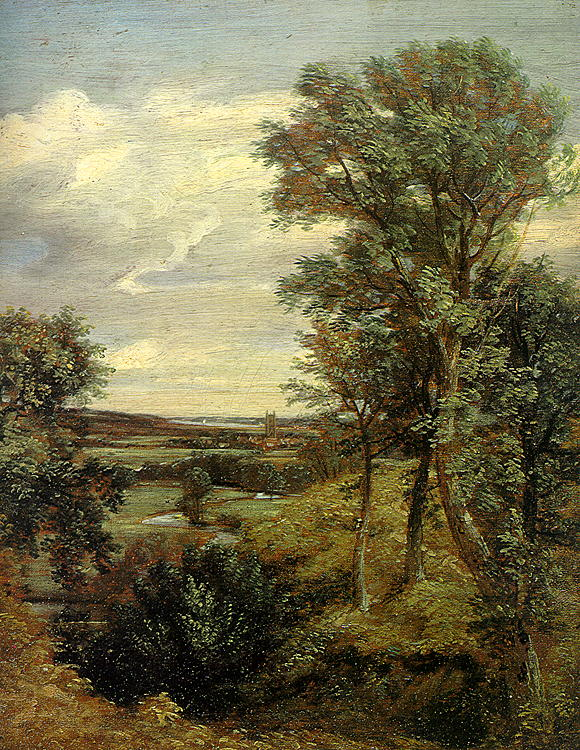
Dedham Vale, John Constable 1802

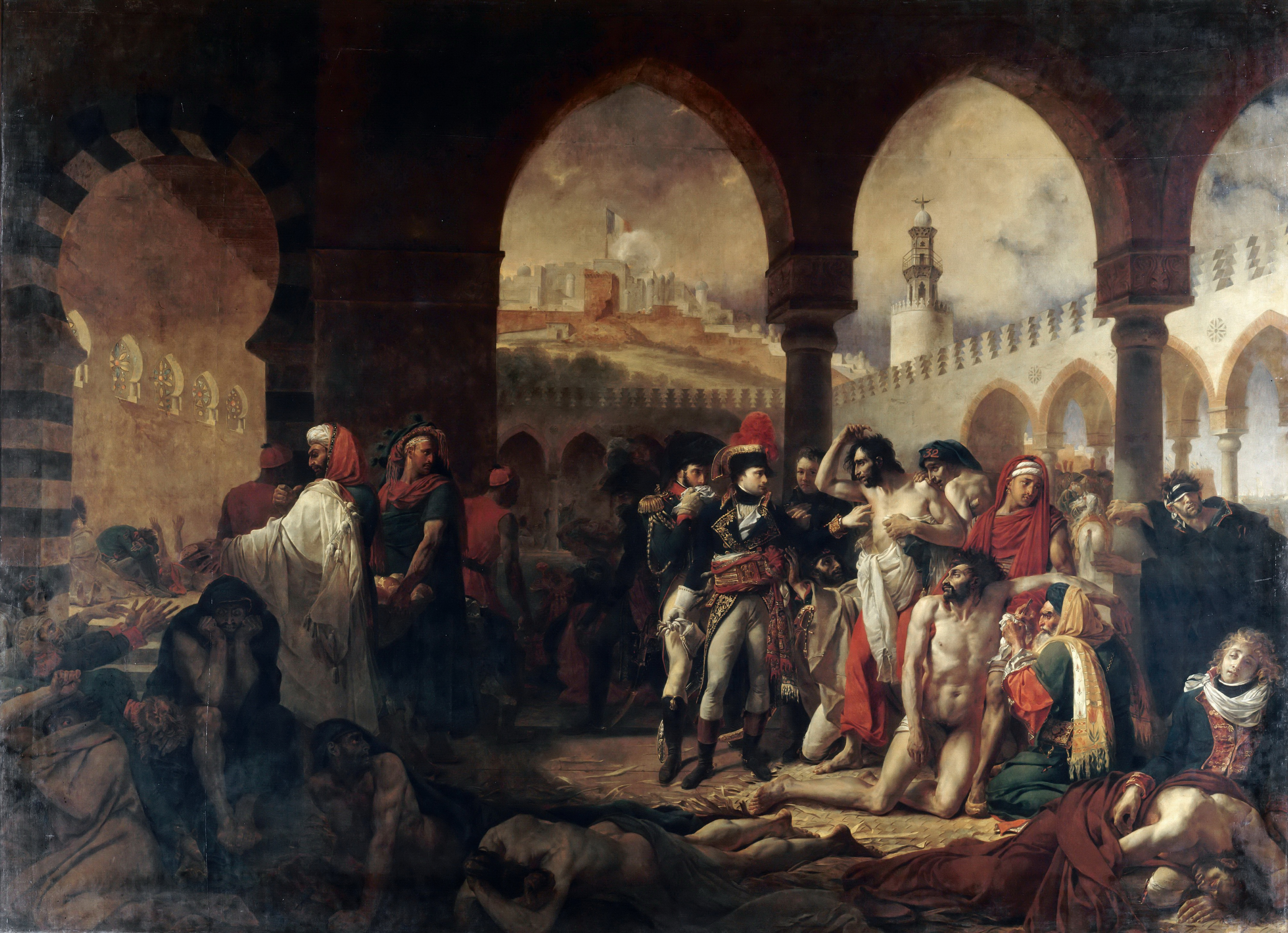
Antoine-Jean Gros, 1804

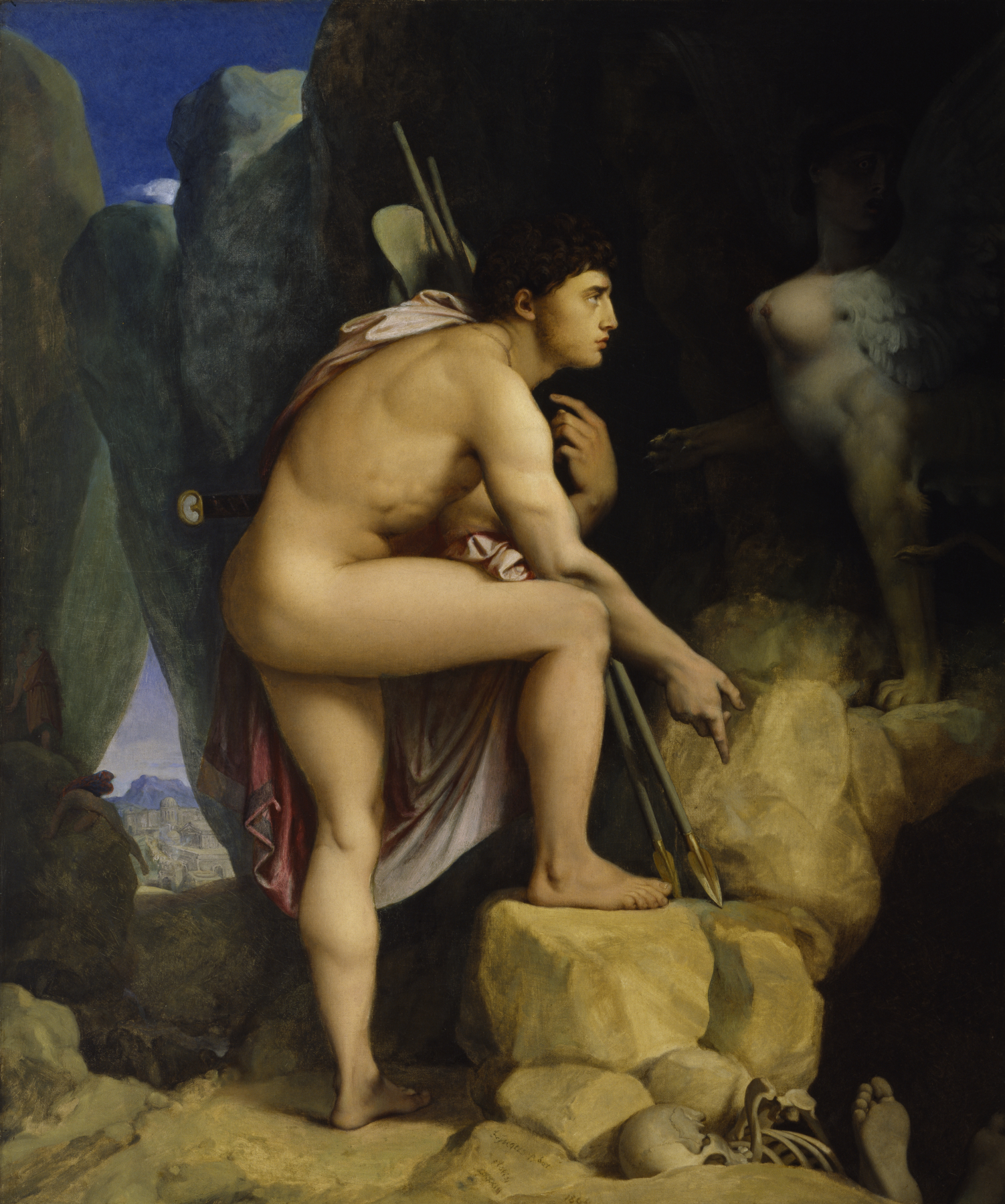
Jean Auguste Dominique Ingres 1814

Francisco de Goya 1814

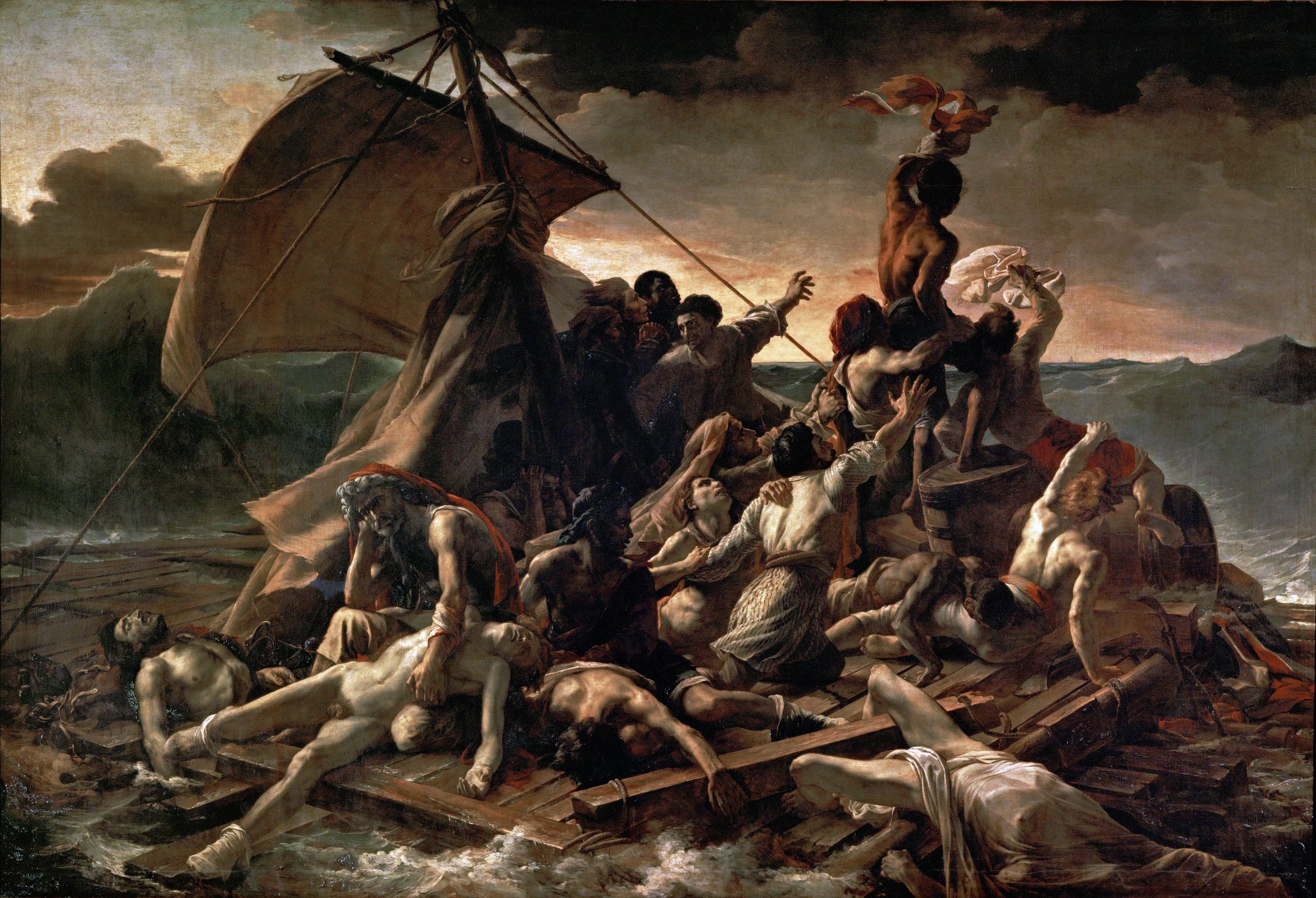
Théodore Géricault 1819

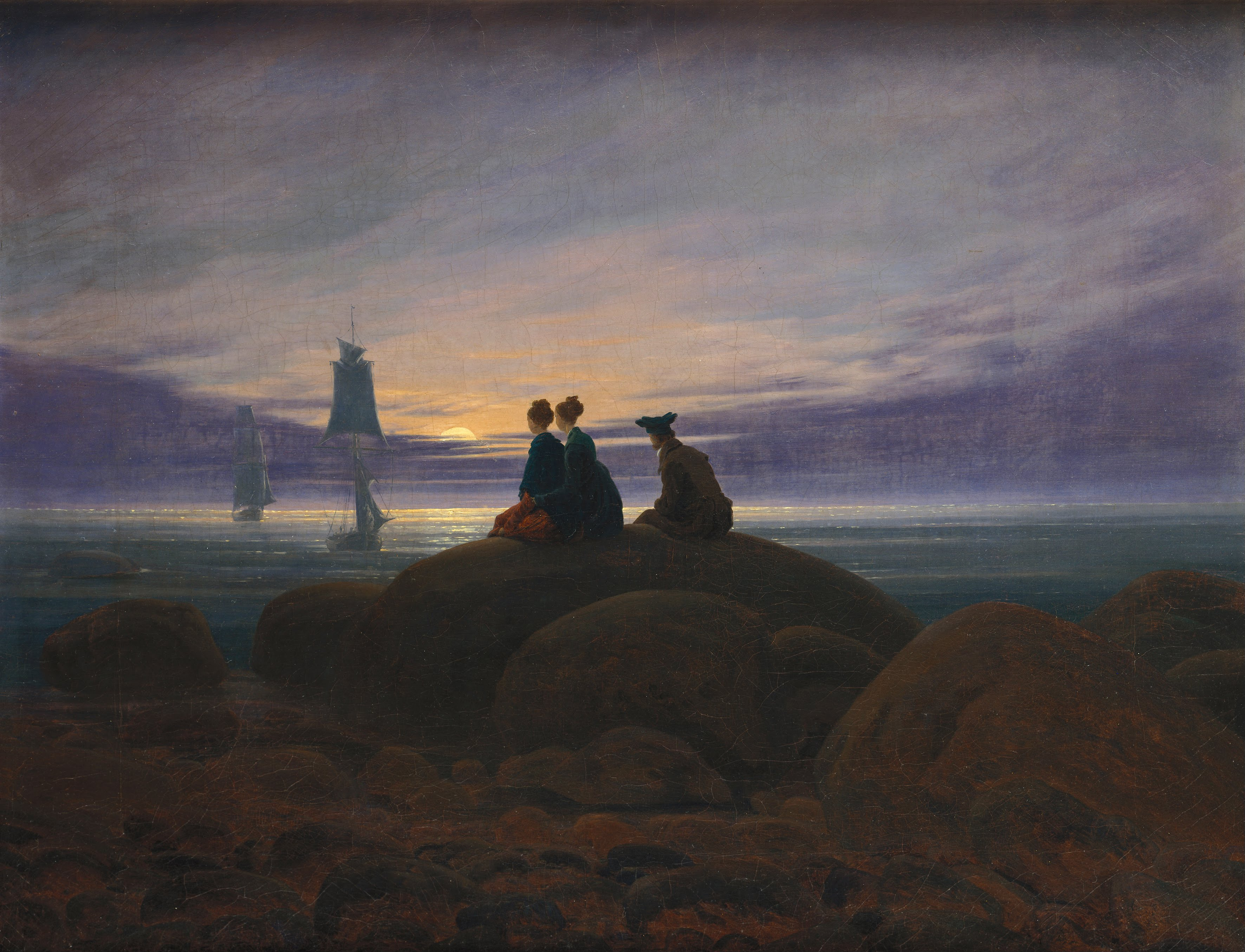
Caspar David Friedrich c.1822

Eugène Delacroix 1830

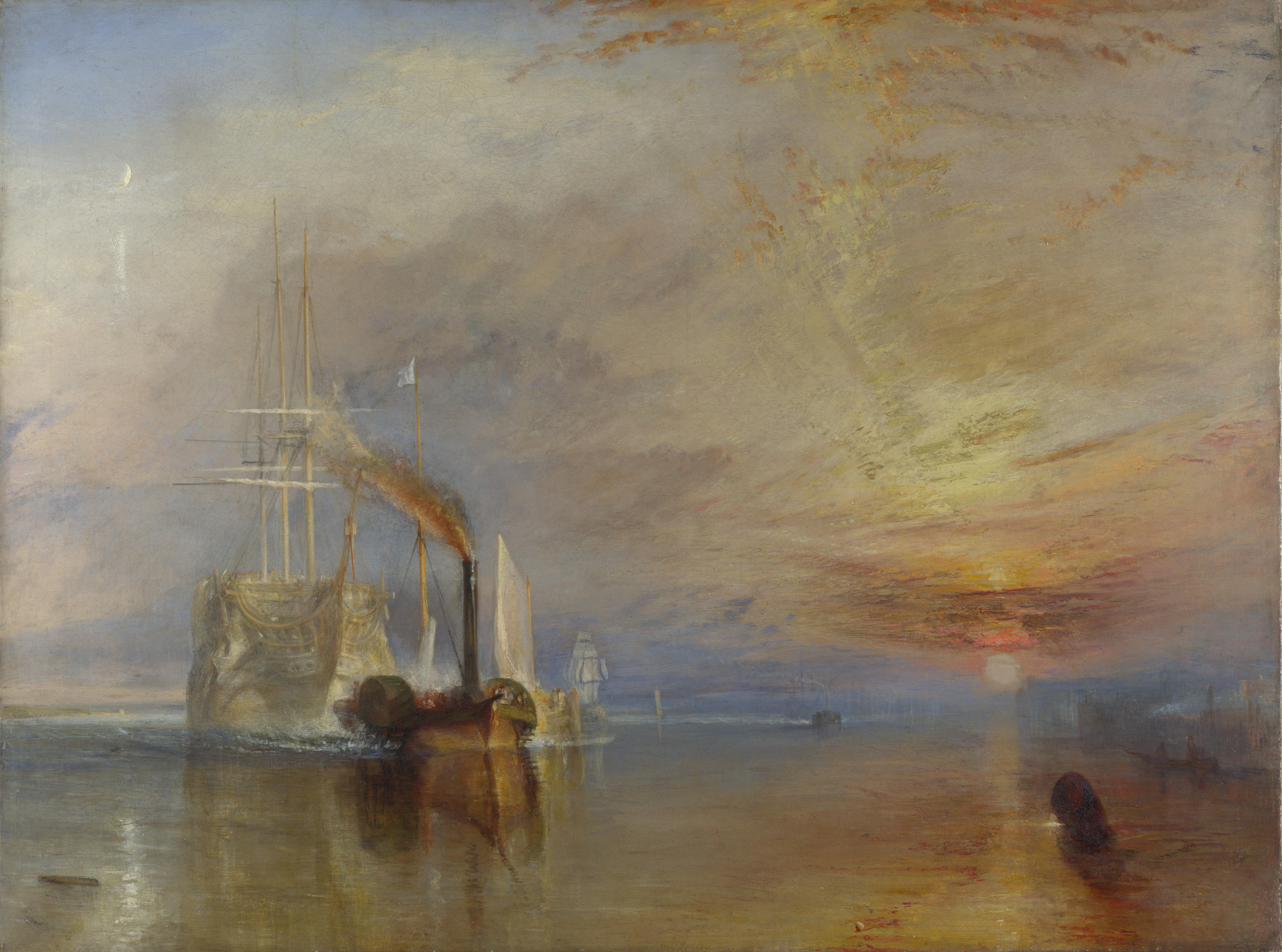
J. M. W. Turner 1838

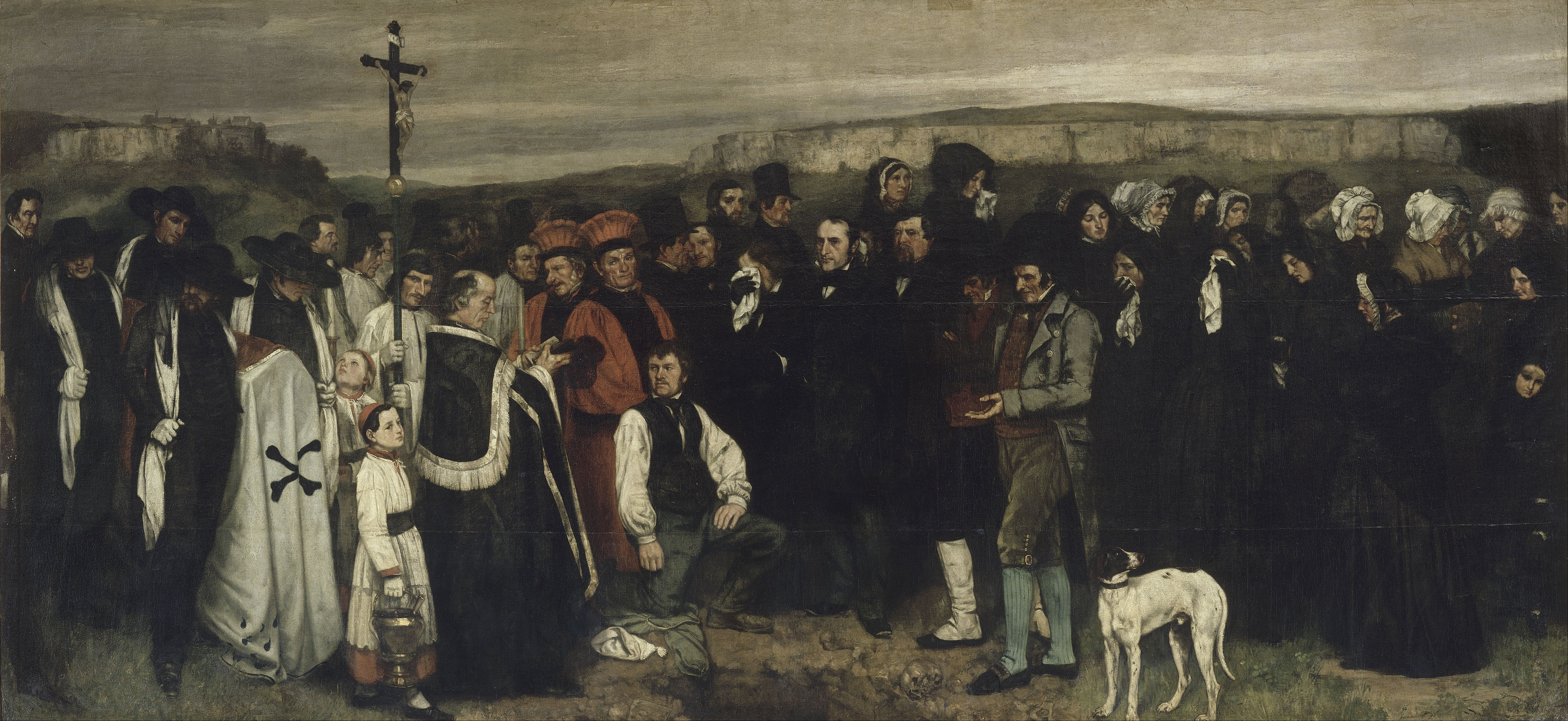
Gustave Courbet 1849–1850

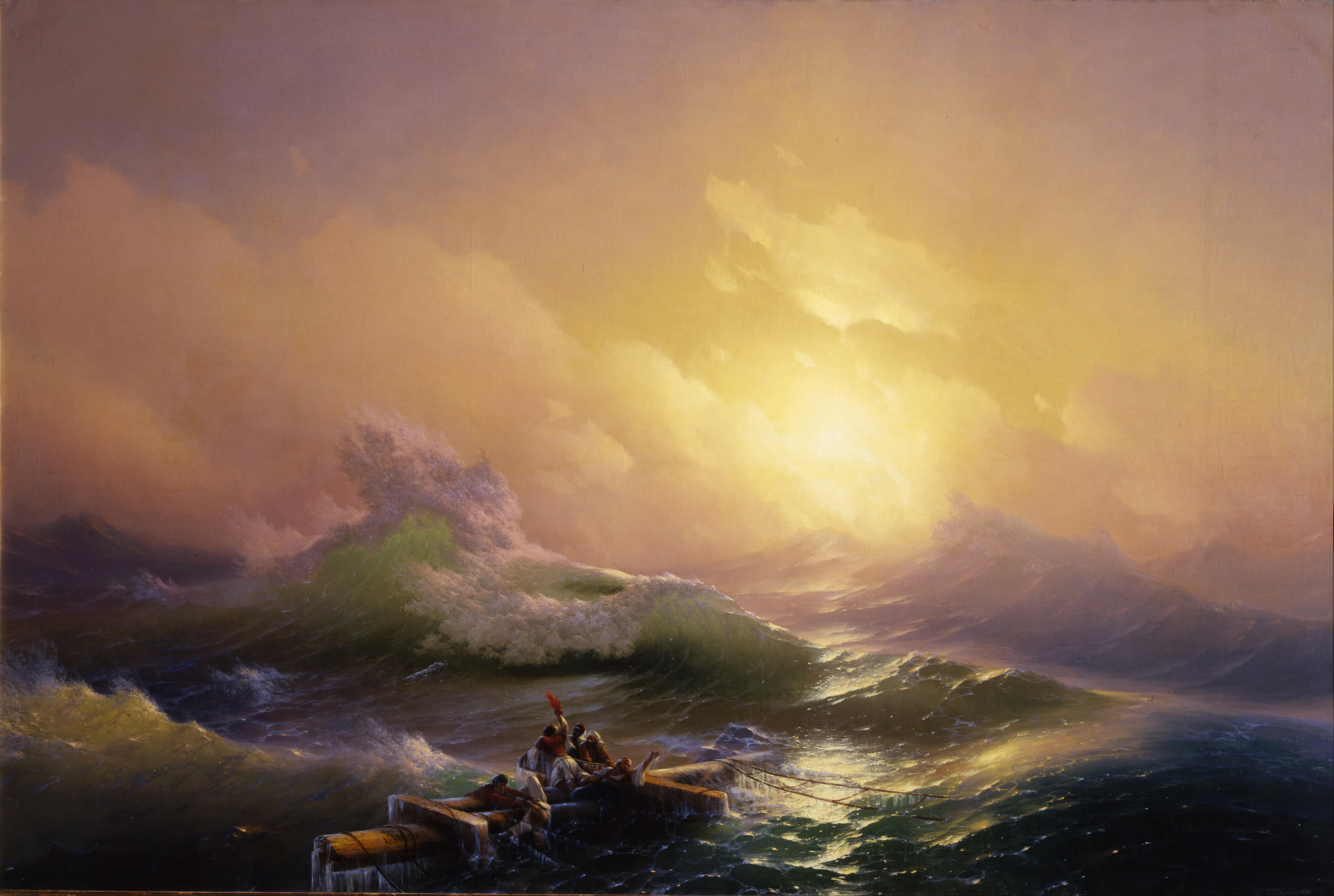
Ivan Aivazovsky 1850

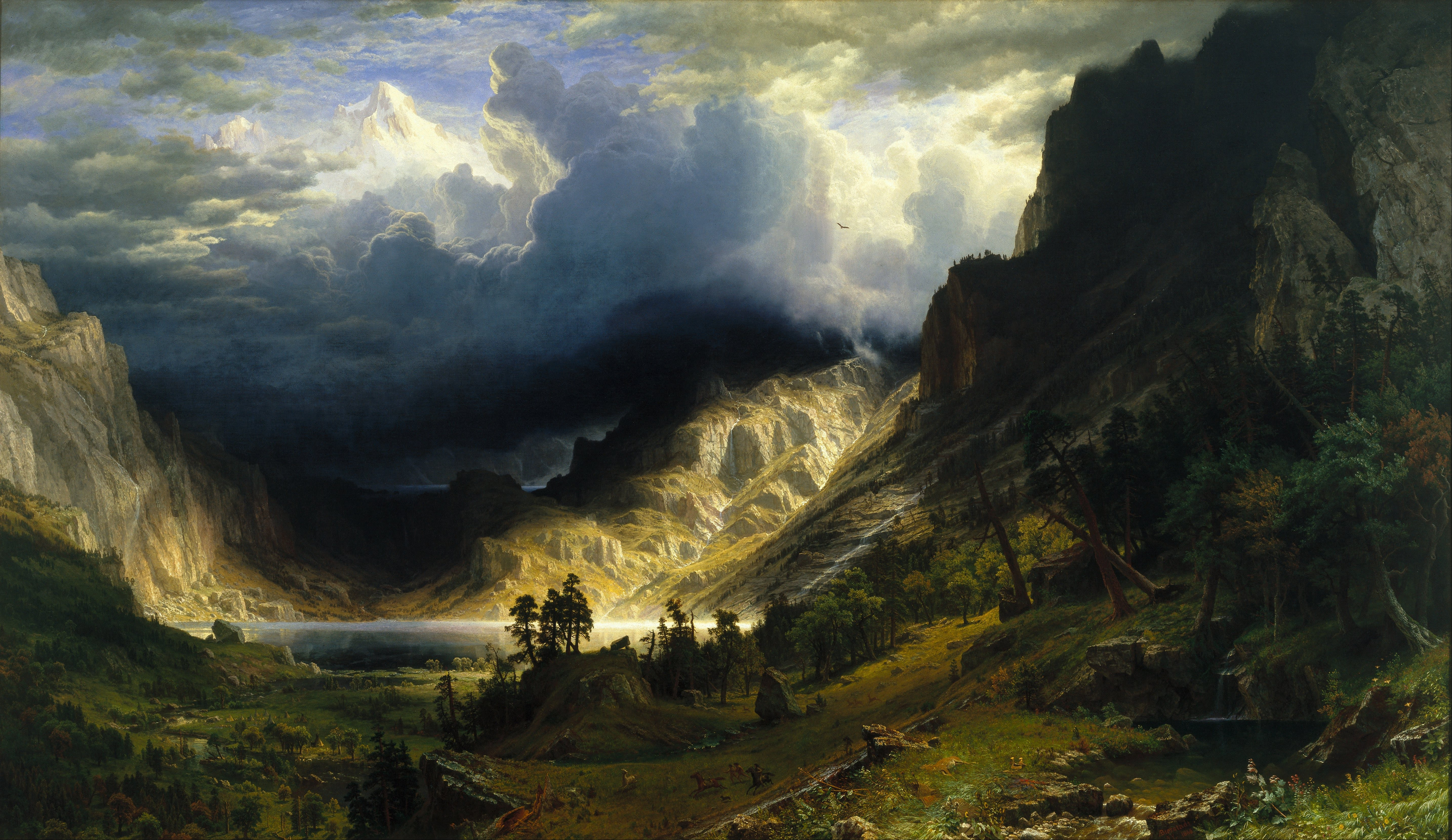
Albert Bierstadt 1866

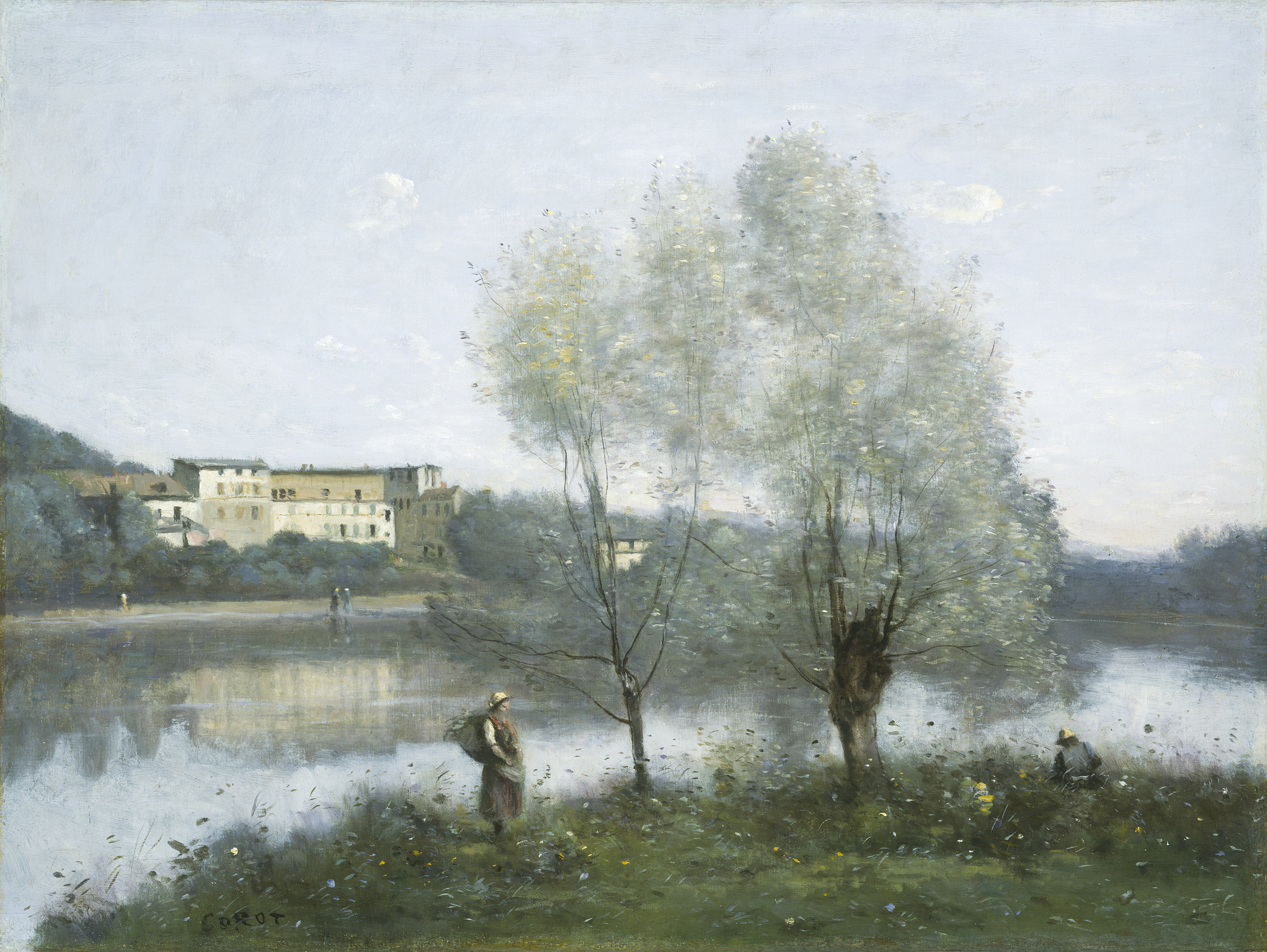
Camille Corot c.1867

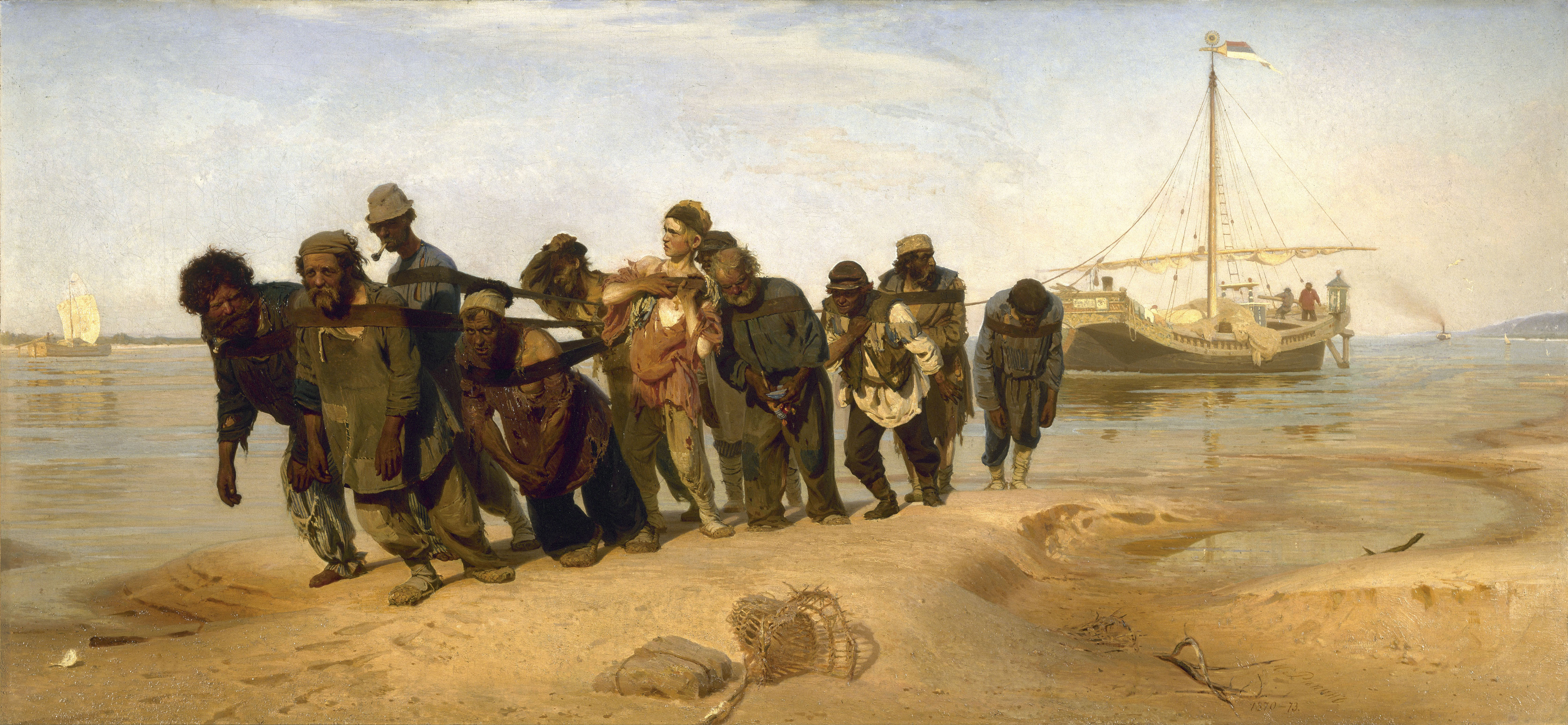
Ilya Repin 1870–1873

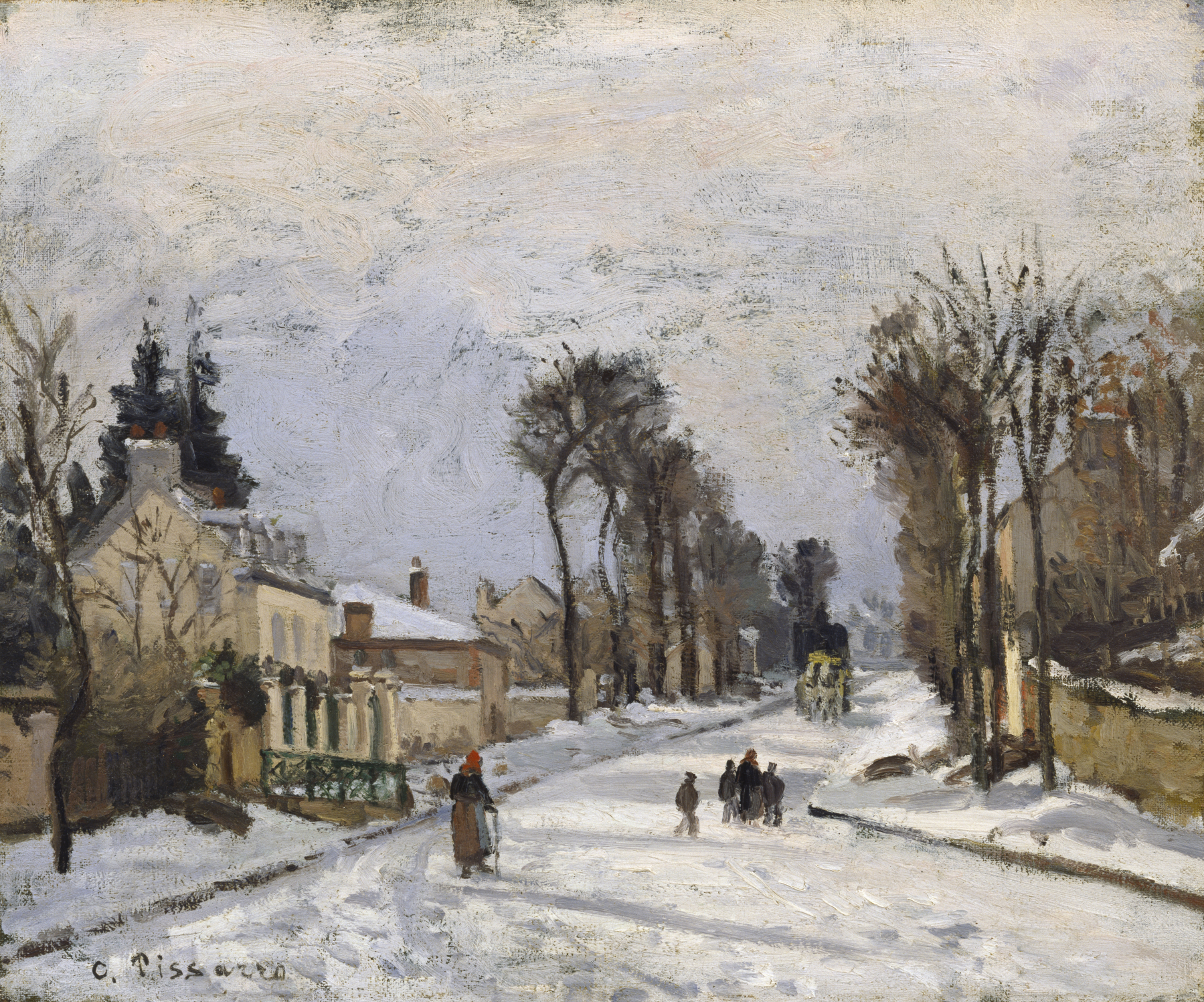
Camille Pissarro 1872

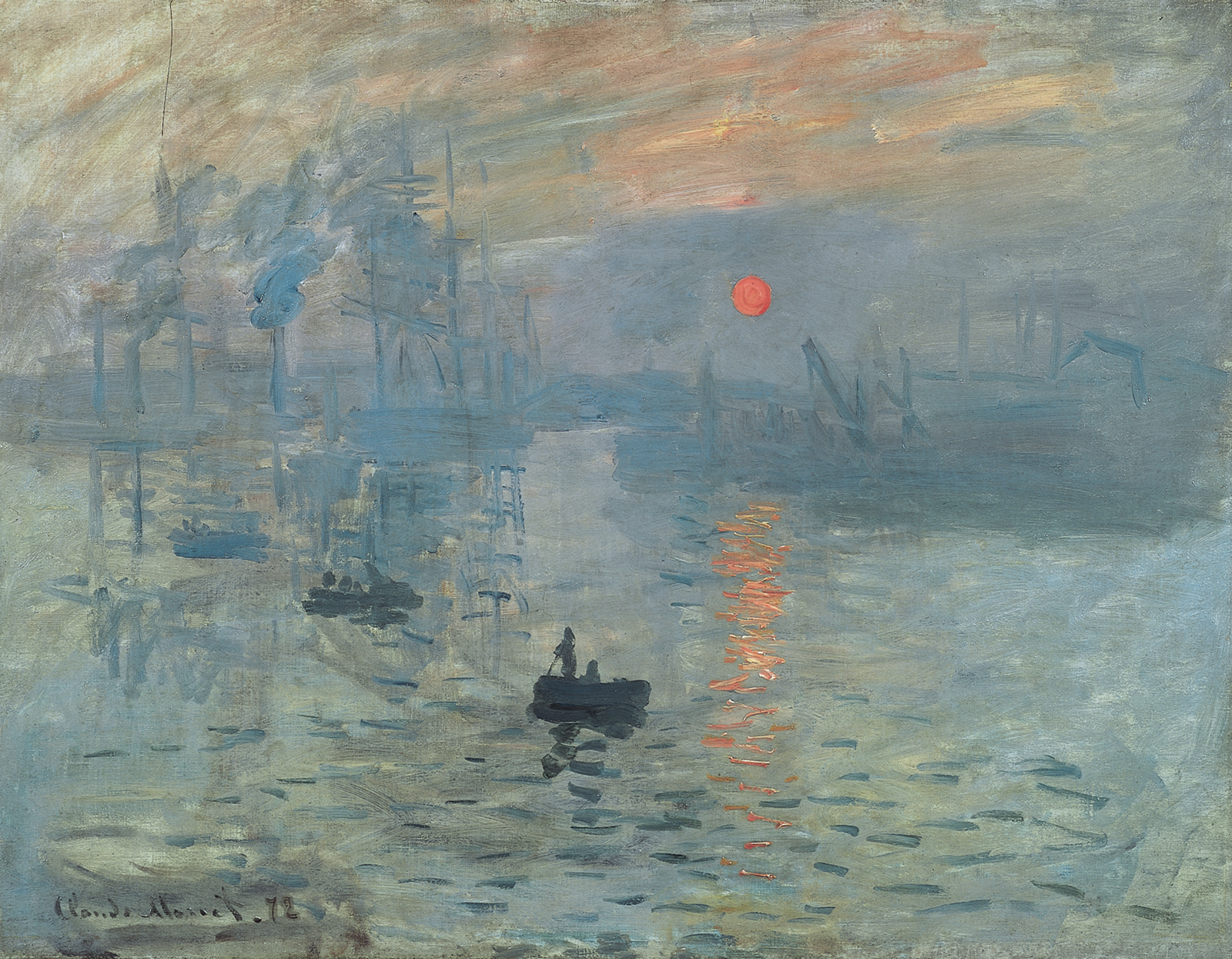
Claude Monet 1872

Pierre-Auguste Renoir 1876

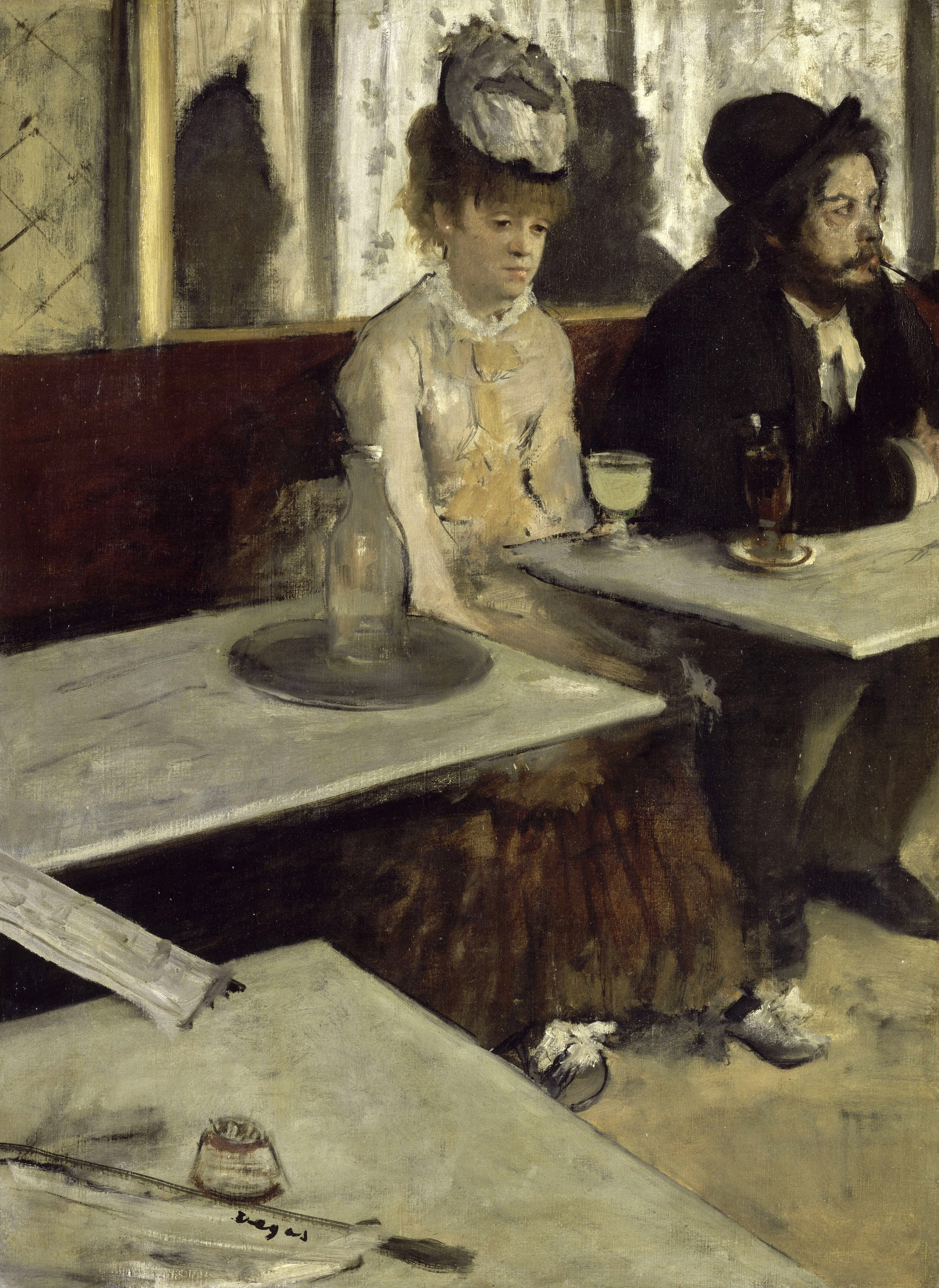
Edgar Degas 1876

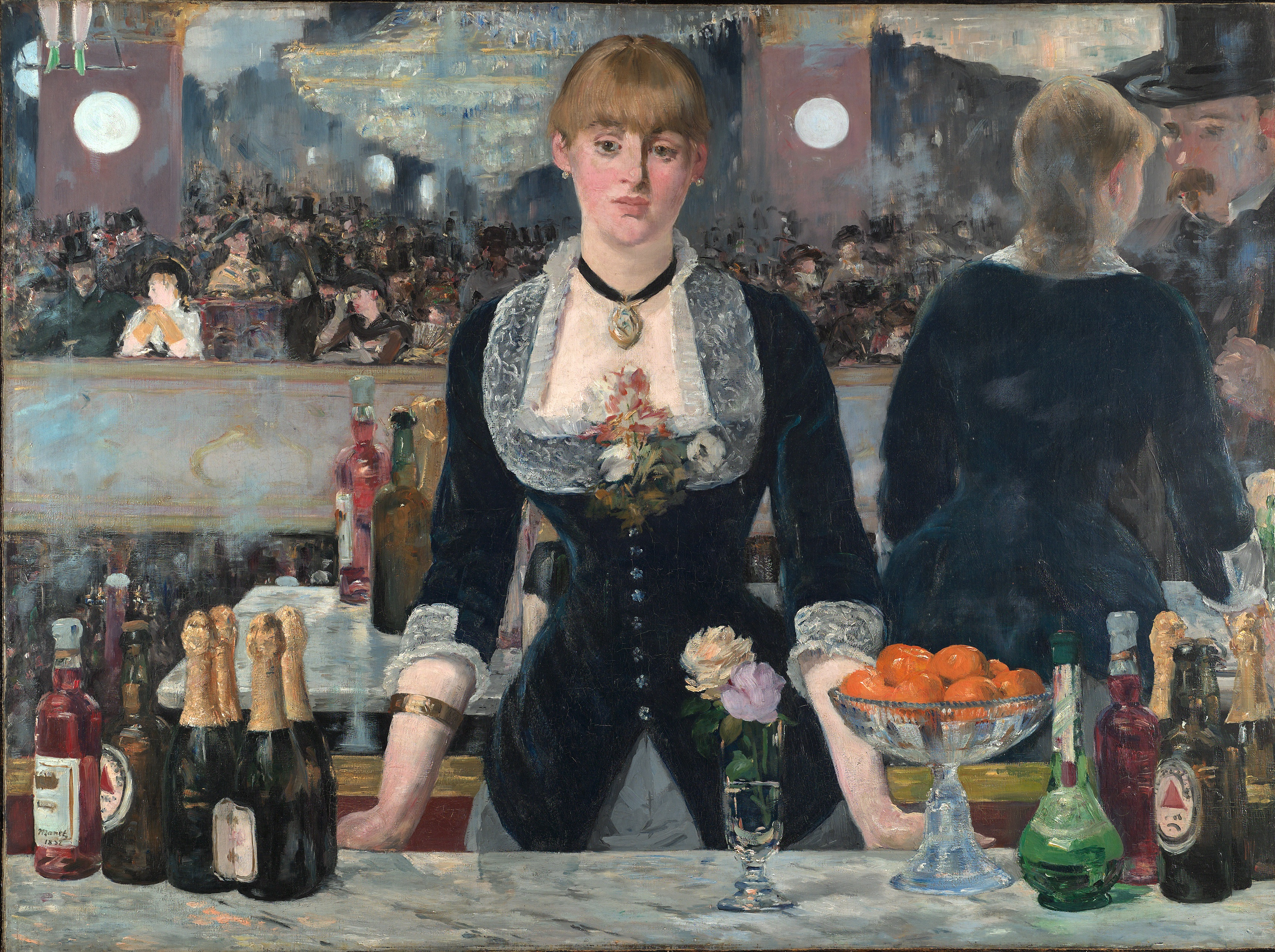
Édouard Manet 1882

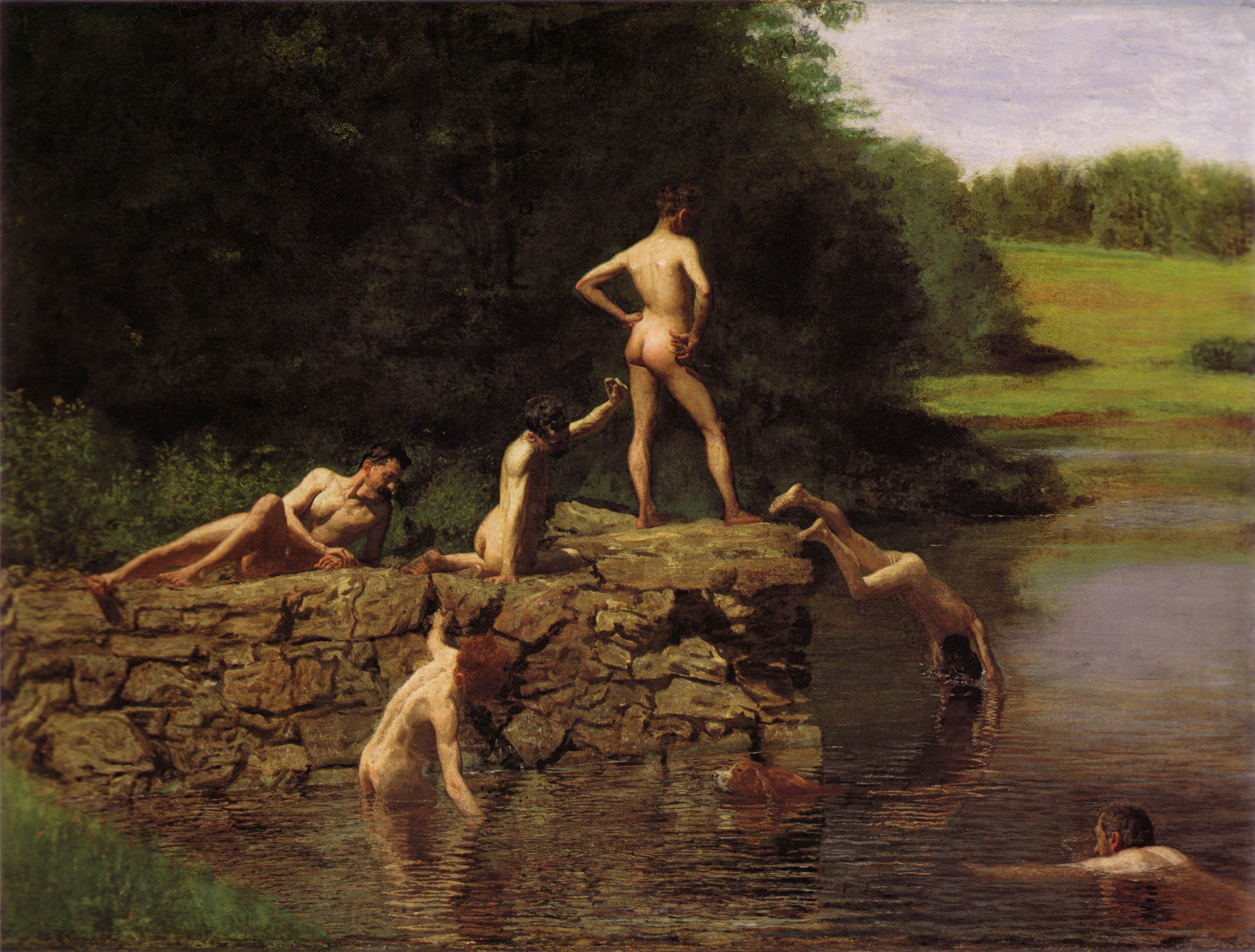
Thomas Eakins 1884–1885

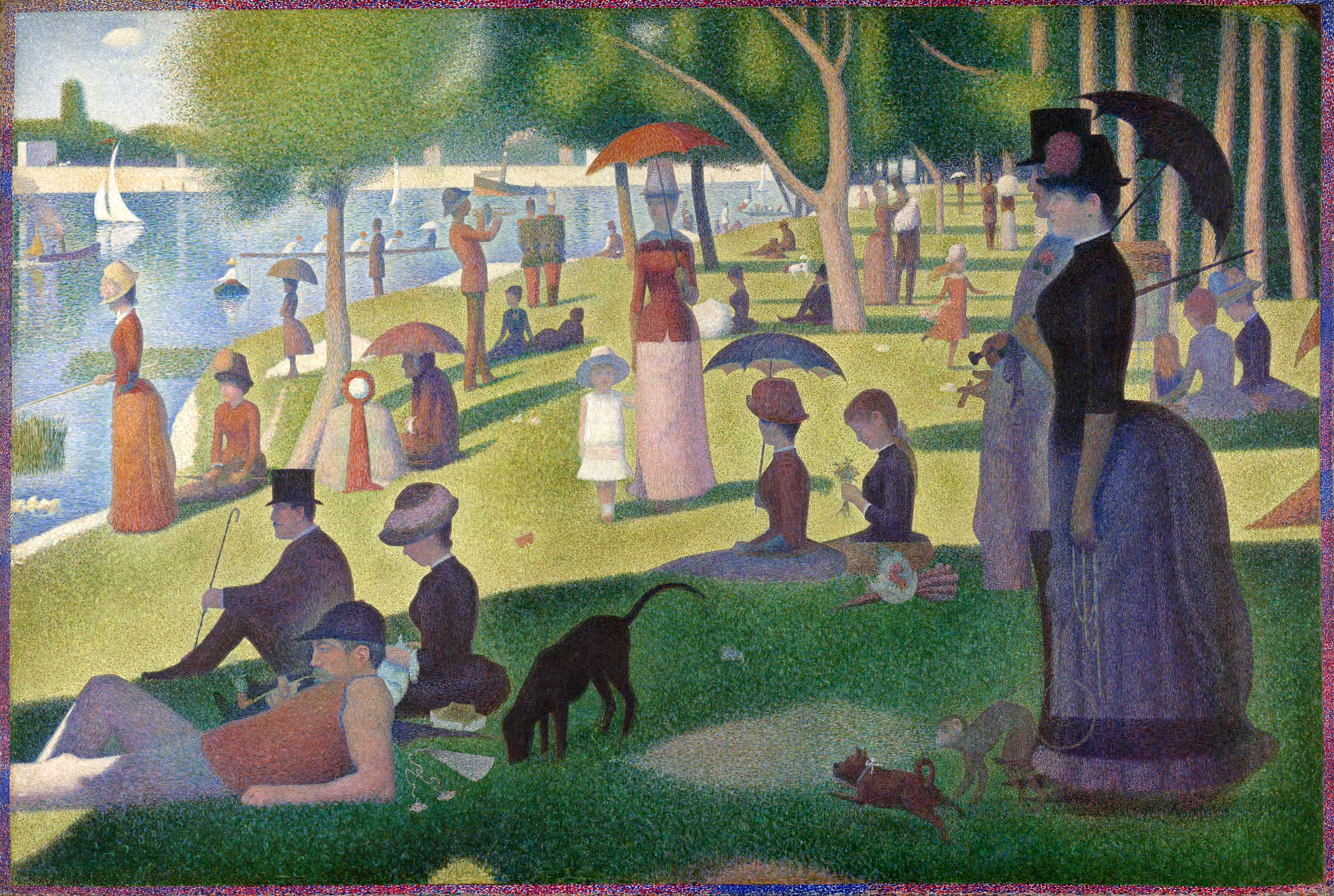
Georges Seurat 1884–1886

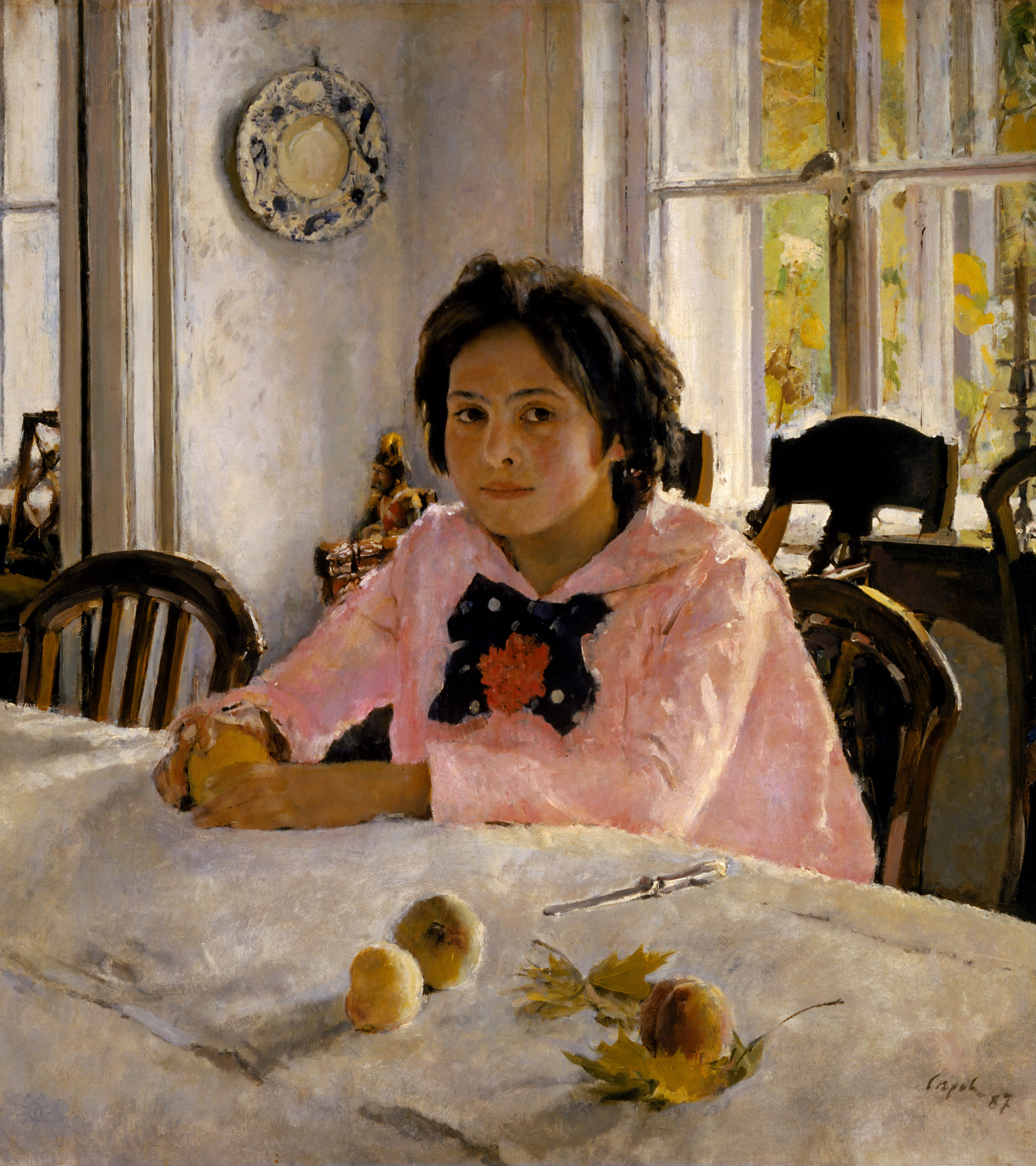
Valentin Serov 1887

Vincent van Gogh 1889

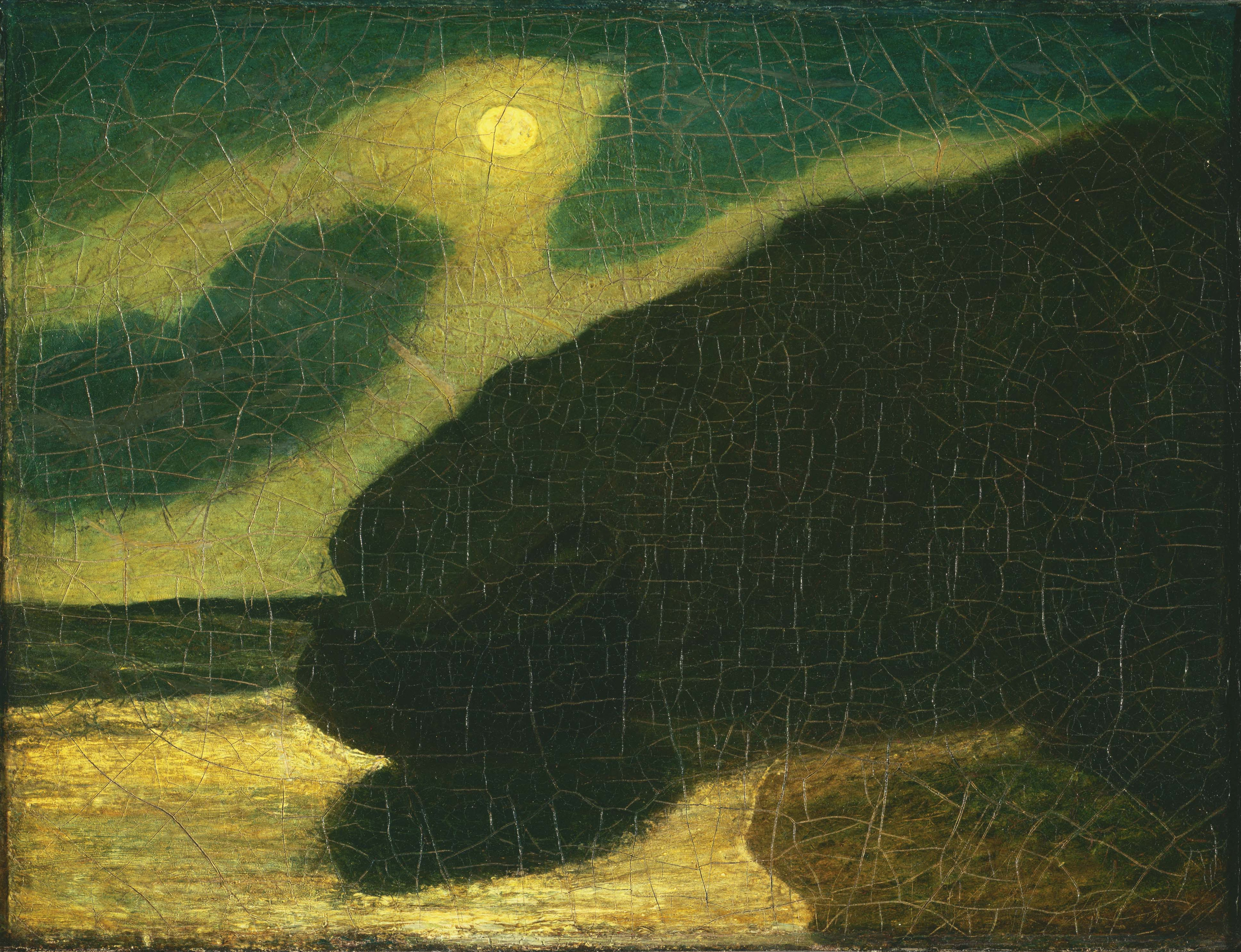
Albert Pinkham Ryder 1890

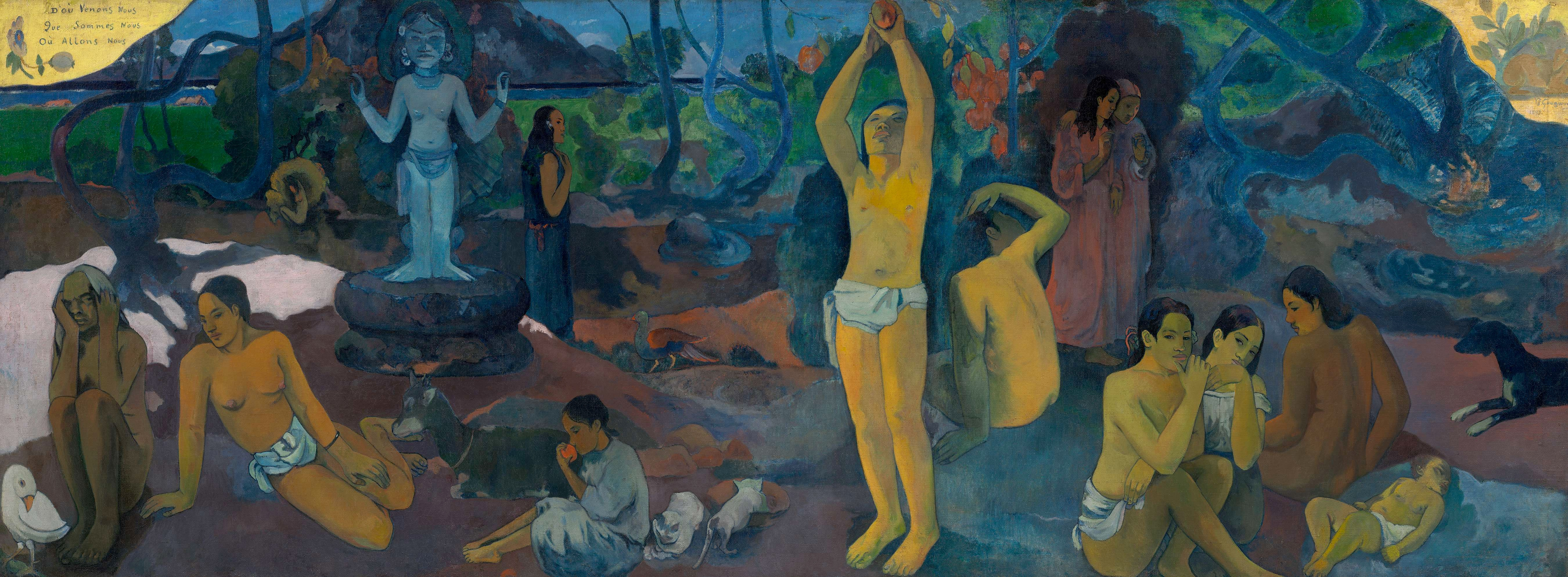
Paul Gauguin 1897–1898

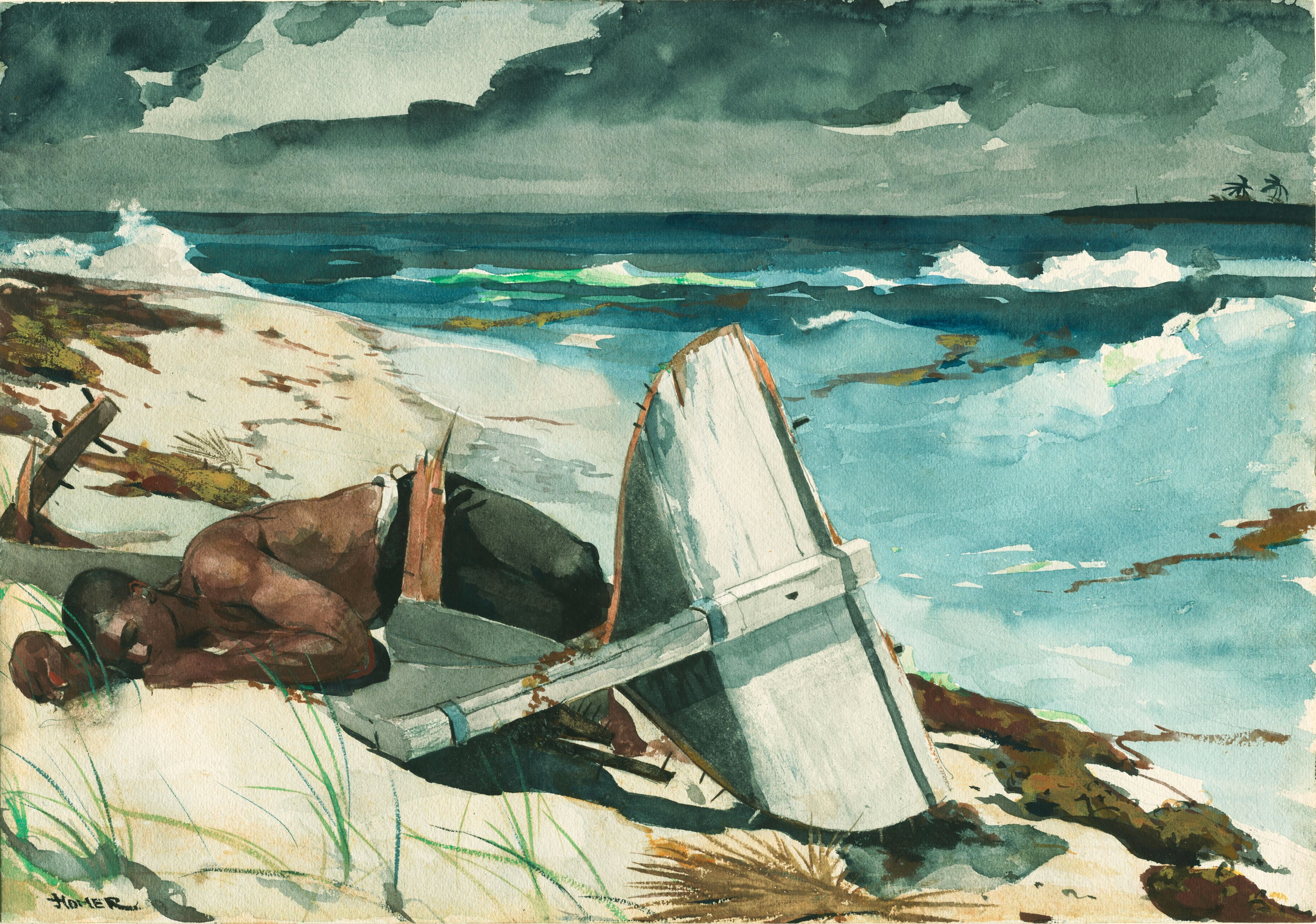
Winslow Homer 1899

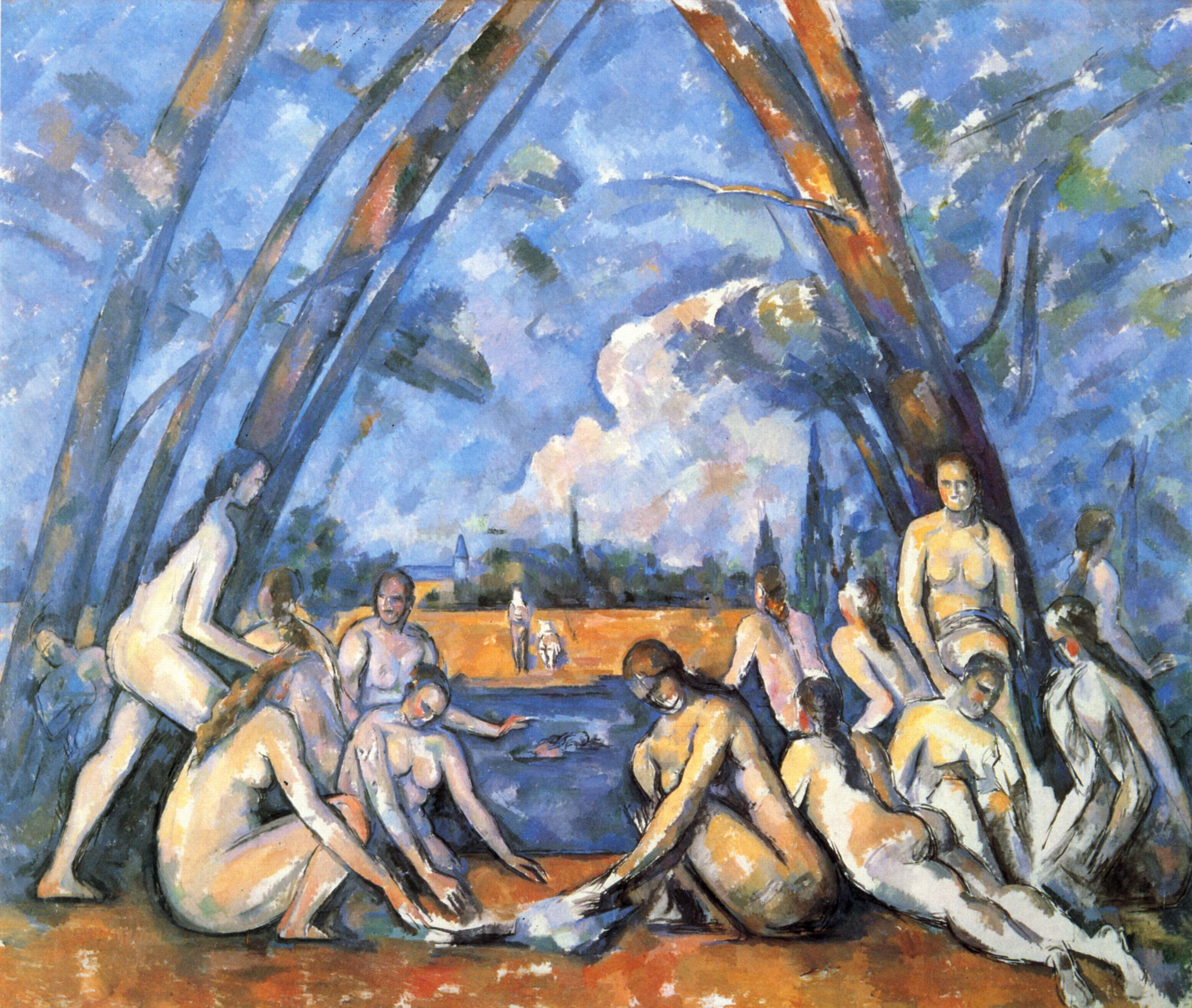
Paul Cézanne 1906

=== 20th-century modern and contemporary ===
==== Pioneers of the 20th century ====
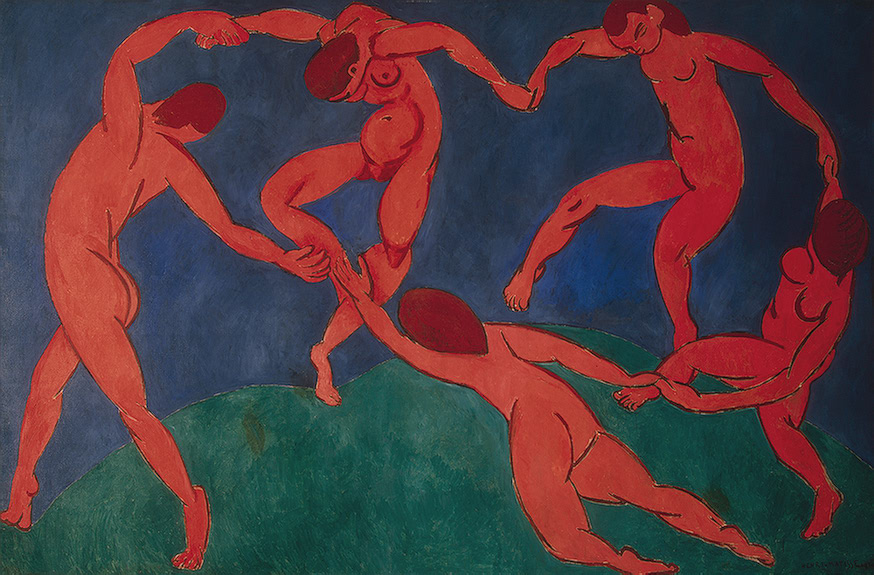
Henri Matisse 1909, late Fauvism

Painters such as Van Gogh, Cézanne, Gauguin, and Seurat was essential for the development of modern art. At the beginning of the 20th century Henri Matisse and several other young artists including the pre-cubist Georges Braque, André Derain, Raoul Dufy and Maurice de Vlaminck revolutionized the Paris art world with "wild", multi-colored, expressive, landscapes and figure paintings that the critics called Fauvism. Henri Matisse's second version of The Dance signifies a key point in his career and in the development of modern painting. It reflects Matisse's incipient fascination with primitive art: the intense warm colors against the cool blue-green background and the rhythmical succession of dancing nudes convey the feelings of emotional liberation and hedonism. Pablo Picasso made his first cubist paintings based on Cézanne's idea that all depiction of nature can be reduced to three solids: cube, sphere and cone. With the painting Les Demoiselles d'Avignon 1907, Picasso dramatically created a new and radical picture depicting a raw and primitive brothel scene with five prostitutes, violently painted women, reminiscent of African tribal masks and his own new Cubist inventions. analytic Cubism was jointly developed by Pablo Picasso and Georges Braque, exemplified by Violin and Candlestick, Paris, from about 1908 through 1912. Analytic cubism, the first clear manifestation of cubism, was followed by synthetic cubism, practised by Braque, Picasso, Fernand Léger, Juan Gris, Albert Gleizes, Marcel Duchamp and countless other artists into the 1920s. Synthetic cubism is characterized by the introduction of different textures, surfaces, collage elements, papier collé and a large variety of merged subject matter.

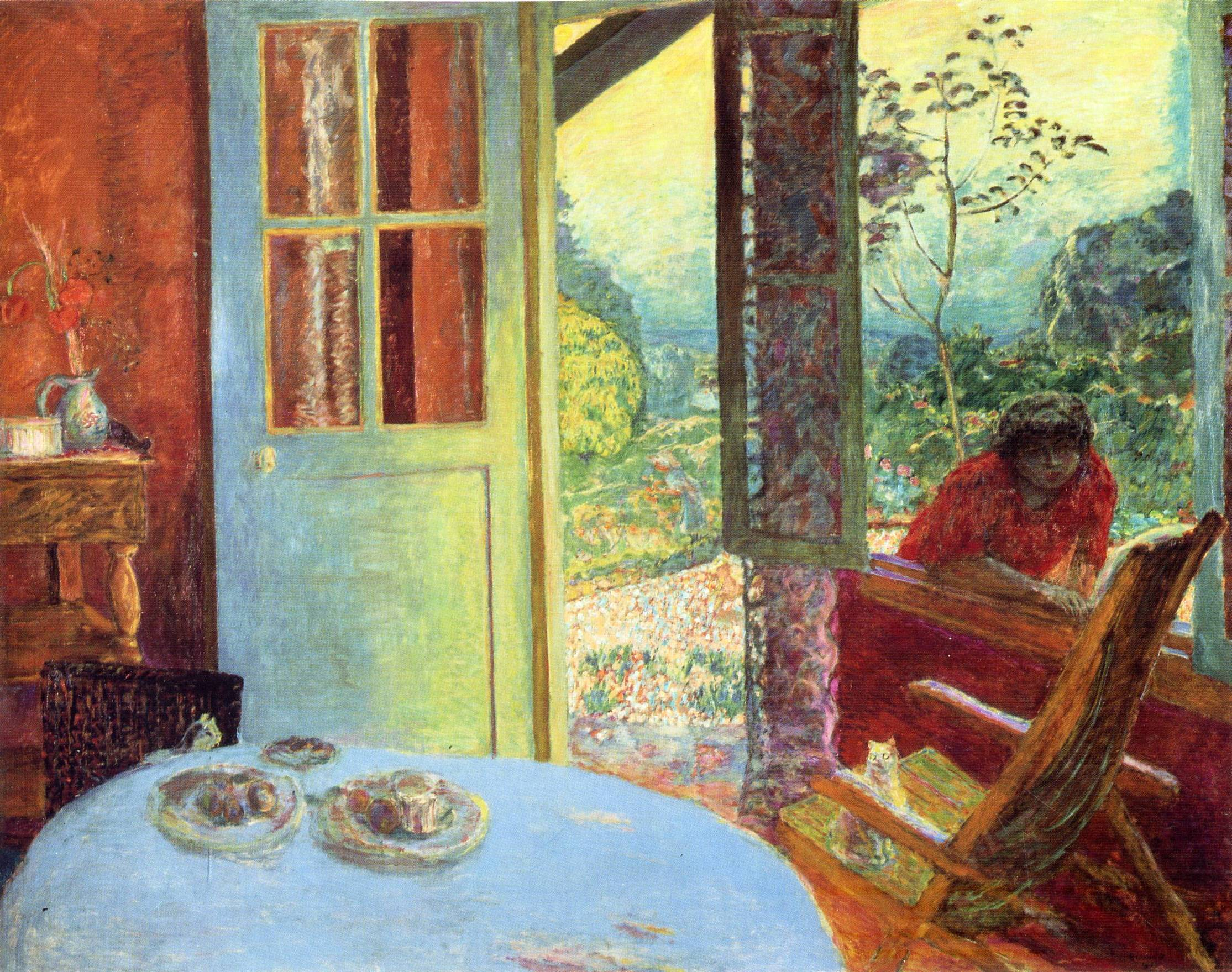
Pierre Bonnard, 1913, European modernist Narrative painting

Les Fauves (French for The Wild Beasts) were early-20th-century painters, experimenting with freedom of expression through color. The name was given, humorously and not as a compliment, to the group by art critic Louis Vauxcelles. Fauvism was a short-lived and loose grouping of early-20th-century artists whose works emphasized painterly qualities, and the imaginative use of deep color over the representational values. Fauvists made the subject of the painting easy to read, exaggerated perspectives and an interesting prescient prediction of the Fauves was expressed in 1888 by Paul Gauguin to Paul Sérusier,

"How do you see these trees? They are yellow. So, put in yellow; this shadow, rather blue, paint it with pure ultramarine; these red leaves? Put in vermilion."

The leaders of the movement were Henri Matisse and André Derain – friendly rivals of a sort, each with his own followers. Ultimately Matisse became the yang to Picasso's yin in the 20th century. Fauvist painters included Albert Marquet, Charles Camoin, Maurice de Vlaminck, Raoul Dufy, Othon Friesz, the Dutch painter Kees van Dongen, and Picasso's partner in Cubism, Georges Braque amongst others.

Giorgio de Chirico 1914, pre-Surrealism

Fauvism, as a movement, had no concrete theories, and was short lived, beginning in 1905 and ending in 1907, they only had three exhibitions. Matisse was seen as the leader of the movement, due to his seniority in age and prior self-establishment in the academic art world. His 1905 portrait of Mme. Matisse The Green Line, (above), caused a sensation in Paris when it was first exhibited. He said he wanted to create art to delight; art as a decoration was his purpose and it can be said that his use of bright colors tries to maintain serenity of composition. In 1906 at the suggestion of his dealer Ambroise Vollard, André Derain went to London and produced a series of paintings like Charing Cross Bridge, London (above) in the Fauvist style, paraphrasing the famous series by the Impressionist painter Claude Monet. Masters like Henri Matisse and Pierre Bonnard continued developing their narrative styles independent of any movement throughout the 20th century.

By 1907 Fauvism no longer was a shocking new movement, soon it was replaced by Cubism on the critics' radar screen as the latest new development in Contemporary Art of the time. In 1907 Apollinaire, commenting about Matisse in an article published in La Falange, said, "We are not here in the presence of an extravagant or an extremist undertaking: Matisse's art is eminently reasonable." Analytic cubism was jointly developed by Pablo Picasso and Georges Braque from about 1908 through 1912. Analytic cubism, the first clear manifestation of cubism, was followed by Synthetic cubism, practised by Braque, Picasso, Fernand Léger, Juan Gris, Albert Gleizes, Marcel Duchamp and countless other artists into the 1920s. Synthetic cubism is characterized by the introduction of different textures, surfaces, collage elements, papier collé and a large variety of merged subject matter.

During the years between 1910 and the end of World War I and after the heyday of cubism, several movements emerged in Paris. Giorgio de Chirico moved to Paris in July 1911, where he joined his brother Andrea (the poet and painter known as Alberto Savinio). Through his brother he met Pierre Laprade a member of the jury at the Salon d'Automne, where he exhibited three of his dreamlike works: Enigma of the Oracle, Enigma of an Afternoon and Self-Portrait. During 1913 he exhibited his work at the Salon des Indépendants and Salon d'Automne, his work was noticed by Pablo Picasso and Guillaume Apollinaire and several others. His compelling and mysterious paintings are considered instrumental to the early beginnings of Surrealism. During the first half of the 20th century in Europe masters like Georges Braque, André Derain, and Giorgio de Chirico continued painting.

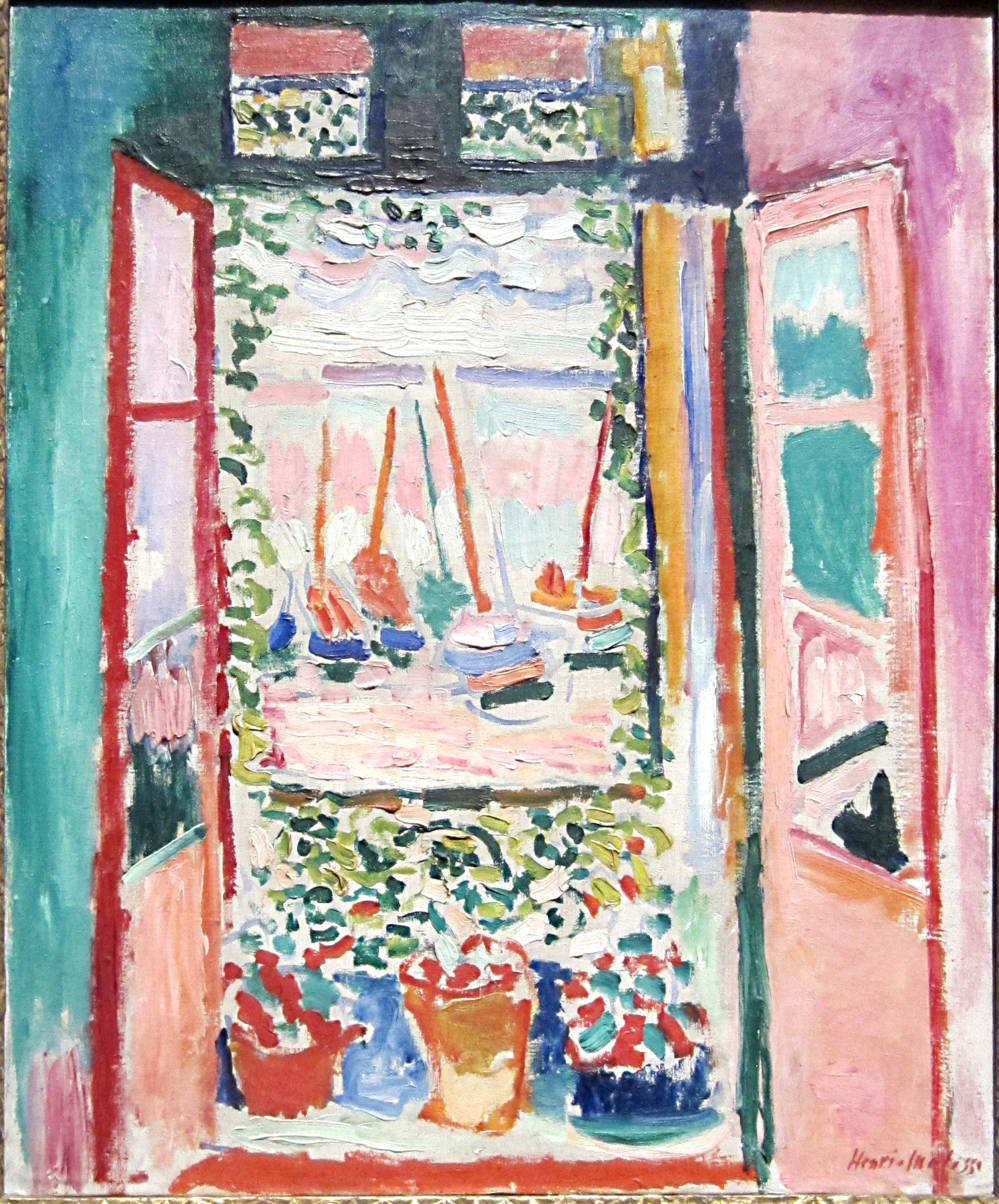
Henri Matisse 1905, Fauvism

Pablo Picasso 1907, Proto-Cubism

Georges Braque 1910, Analytic Cubism

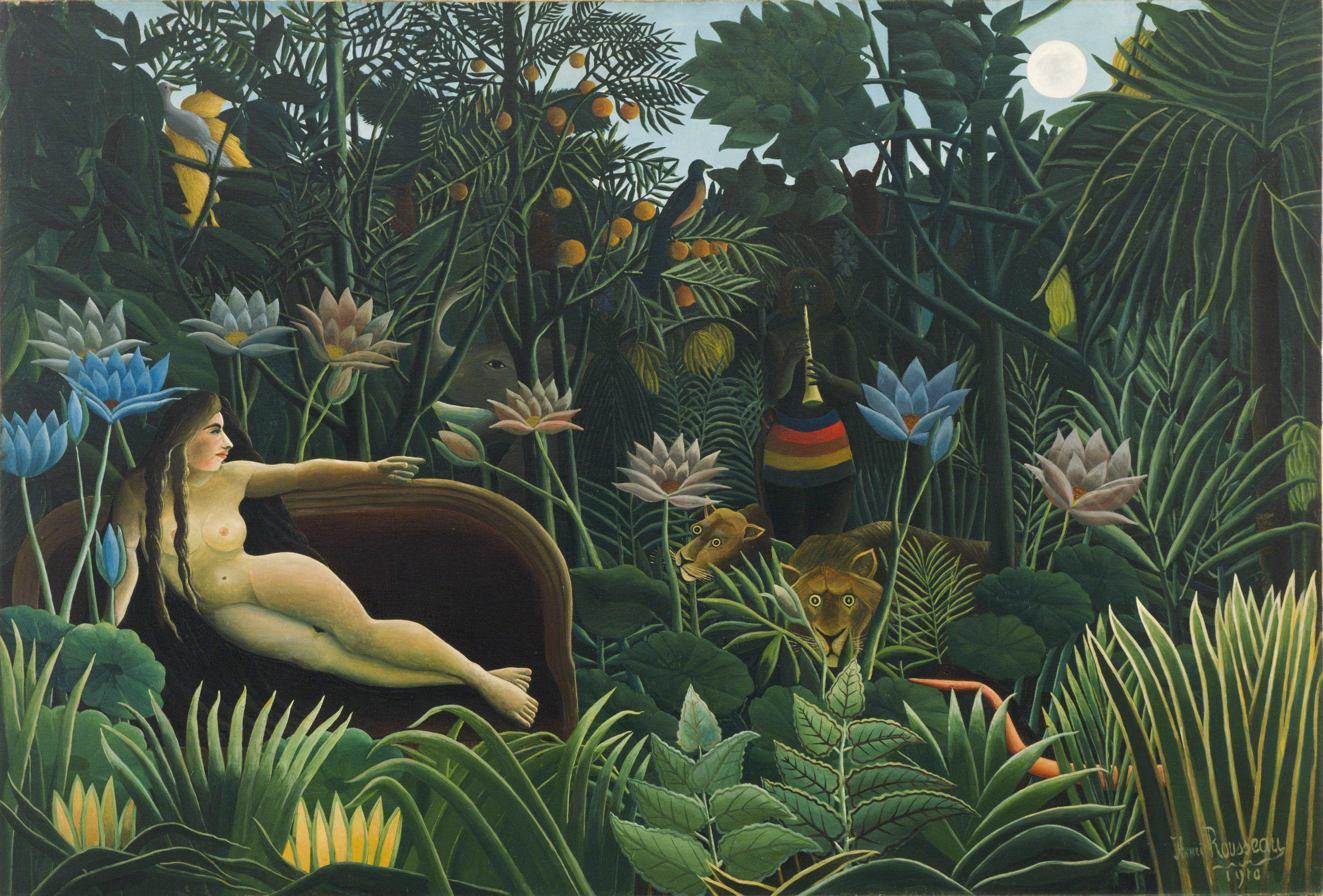
Henri Rousseau 1910 Primitive Surrealism

==== Pioneers of Modern art ====
In the first two decades of the 20th century and after Cubism, several other important movements emerged; futurism (Balla), abstract art (Kandinsky), Der Blaue Reiter), Bauhaus, (Kandinsky) and (Klee), Orphism, (Robert Delaunay and František Kupka), Synchromism (Morgan Russell), De Stijl (Mondrian), Suprematism (Malevich), Constructivism (Tatlin), Dadaism (Duchamp, Picabia, Arp) and Surrealism (De Chirico, André Breton, Miró, Magritte, Dalí, Ernst). Modern painting influenced all the visual arts, from Modernist architecture and design, to avant-garde film, theatre and modern dance and became an experimental laboratory for the expression of visual experience, from photography and concrete poetry to advertising art and fashion. Van Gogh's painting exerted great influence upon 20th-century Expressionism, as can be seen in the work of the Fauves, Die Brücke (a group led by German painter Ernst Kirchner), and the Expressionism of Edvard Munch, Egon Schiele, Marc Chagall, Amedeo Modigliani, Chaïm Soutine and others.

Wassily Kandinsky a Russian painter, printmaker and art theorist, one of the most famous 20th-century artists is generally considered the first important painter of modern abstract art. As an early Modernist, in search of new modes of visual expression, and spiritual expression, he theorized as did contemporary occultists and theosophists, that pure visual abstraction had corollary vibrations with sound and music. They posited that pure abstraction could express pure spirituality. His earliest abstractions were generally titled as the example in the (above gallery) Composition VII, making connection to the work of the composers of music. Kandinsky included many of his theories about abstract art in his book Concerning the Spiritual in Art. Robert Delaunay was a French artist who is associated with Orphism, (reminiscent of a link between pure abstraction and cubism). His later works were more abstract, reminiscent of Paul Klee. His key contributions to abstract painting refer to his bold use of color, and a clear love of experimentation of both depth and tone. At the invitation of Wassily Kandinsky, Delaunay and his wife the artist Sonia Delaunay, joined The Blue Rider (Der Blaue Reiter), a Munich-based group of abstract artists, in 1911, and his art took a turn to the abstract.

Other major pioneers of early abstraction include Russian painter Kasimir Malevich, who after the Russian Revolution in 1917, and after pressure from the Stalinist regime in 1924 returned to painting imagery and Peasants and Workers in the field, and Swiss painter Paul Klee whose masterful color experiments made him an important pioneer of abstract painting at the Bauhaus. Still other important pioneers of abstract painting include the Swedish artist Hilma af Klint, Czech painter František Kupka as well as American artists Stanton Macdonald-Wright and Morgan Russell who, in 1912, founded Synchromism, an art movement that closely resembles Orphism.

Expressionism and Symbolism are broad rubrics that involve several important and related movements in 20th-century painting that dominated much of the avant-garde art being made in Western, Eastern and Northern Europe. Expressionist works were painted largely between World War I and World War II, mostly in France, Germany, Norway, Russia, Belgium, and Austria. Expressionist artists are related to both Surrealism and Symbolism and are each uniquely and somewhat eccentrically personal. Fauvism, Die Brücke, and Der Blaue Reiter are three of the best known groups of Expressionist and Symbolist painters.

Artists as interesting and diverse as Marc Chagall, whose painting I and the Village, (above) tells an autobiographical story that examines the relationship between the artist and his origins, with a lexicon of artistic Symbolism. Gustav Klimt, Egon Schiele, Edvard Munch, Emil Nolde, Chaïm Soutine, James Ensor, Oskar Kokoschka, Ernst Ludwig Kirchner, Max Beckmann, Franz Marc, Käthe Schmidt Kollwitz, Georges Rouault, Amedeo Modigliani and some of the Americans abroad like Marsden Hartley, and Stuart Davis, were considered influential expressionist painters.

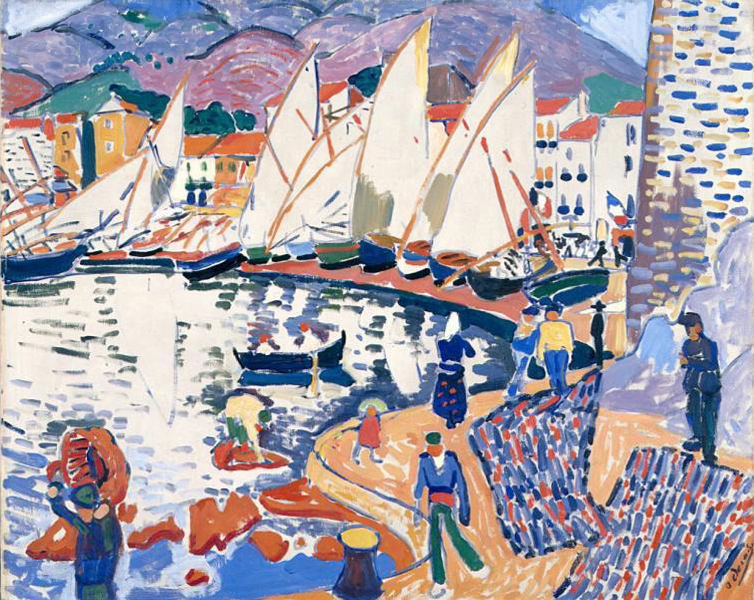
André Derain, 1905, Le séchage des voiles (The Drying Sails), Fauvism

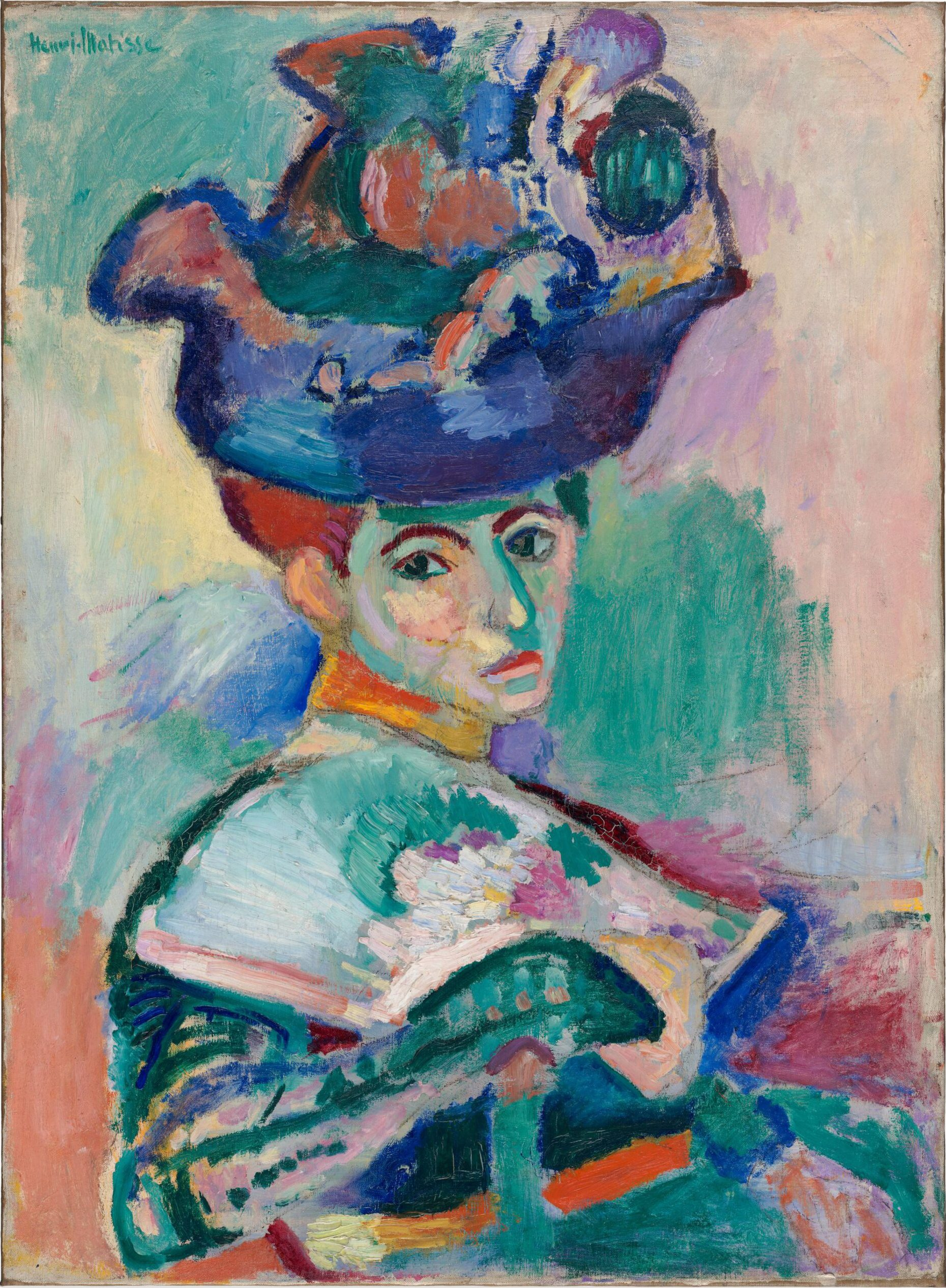
Henri Matisse, 1905, Woman with a Hat, Fauvism

Jean Metzinger, c.1905, Two Nudes in an Exotic Landscape, Divisionism, Proto-Cubism

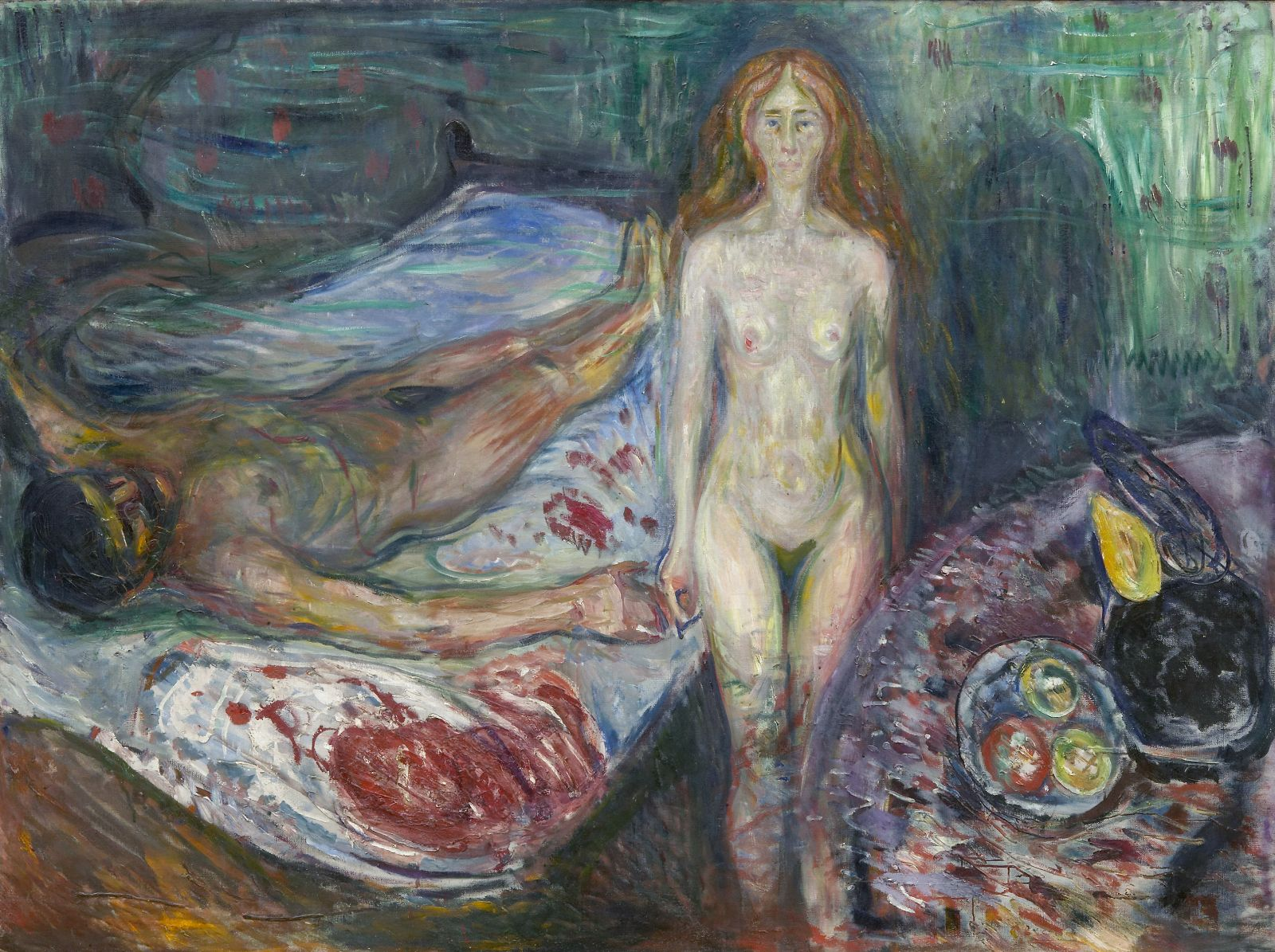
Edvard Munch, Death of Marat I (1907), an example of Expressionism

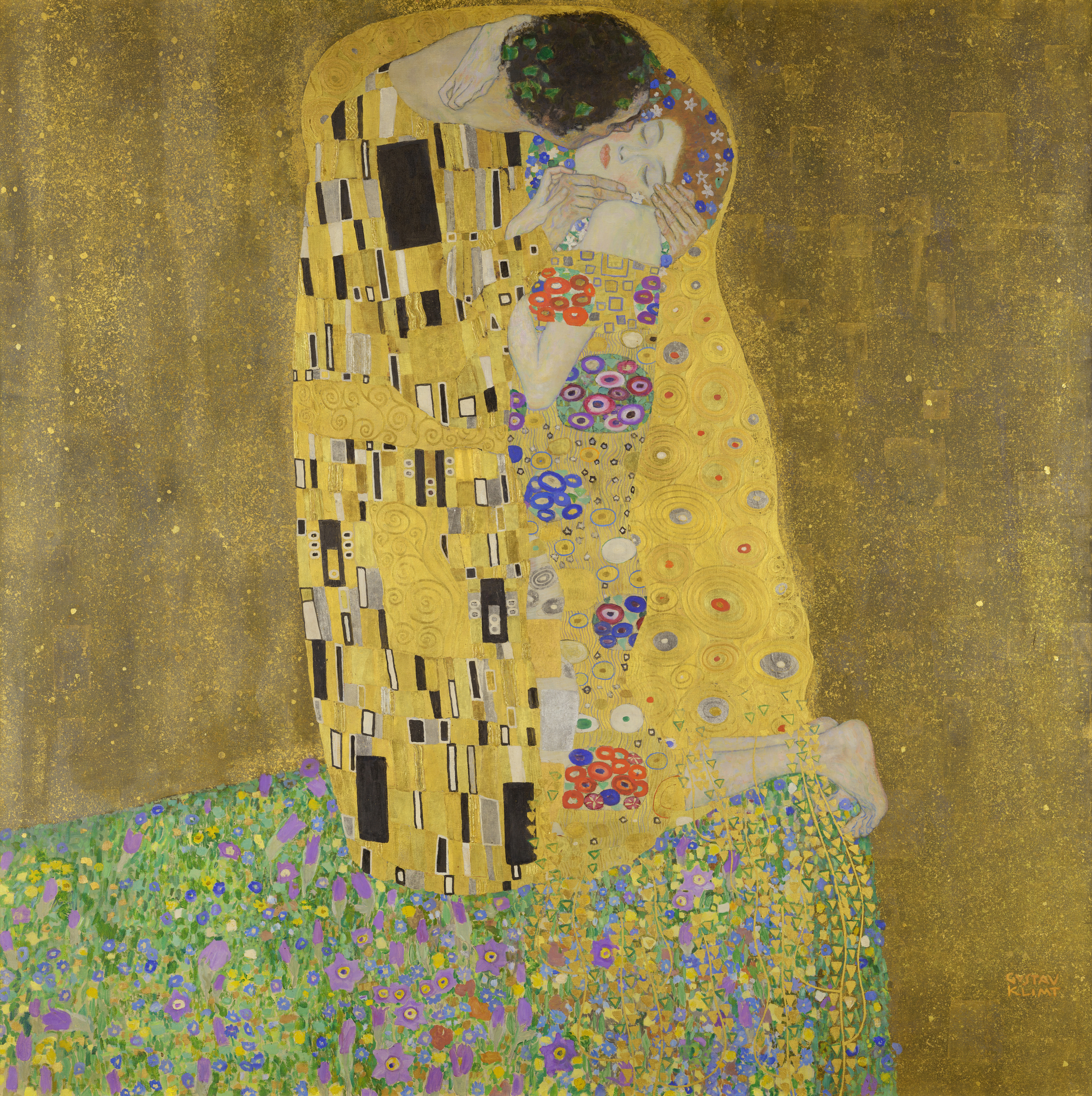
Gustav Klimt, expressionism, 1907–1908

Pablo Picasso, 1908, Dryad, Proto-Cubism

Marc Chagall 1911, expressionism and surrealism

Marcel Duchamp, 1911–1912, Cubism and Dada

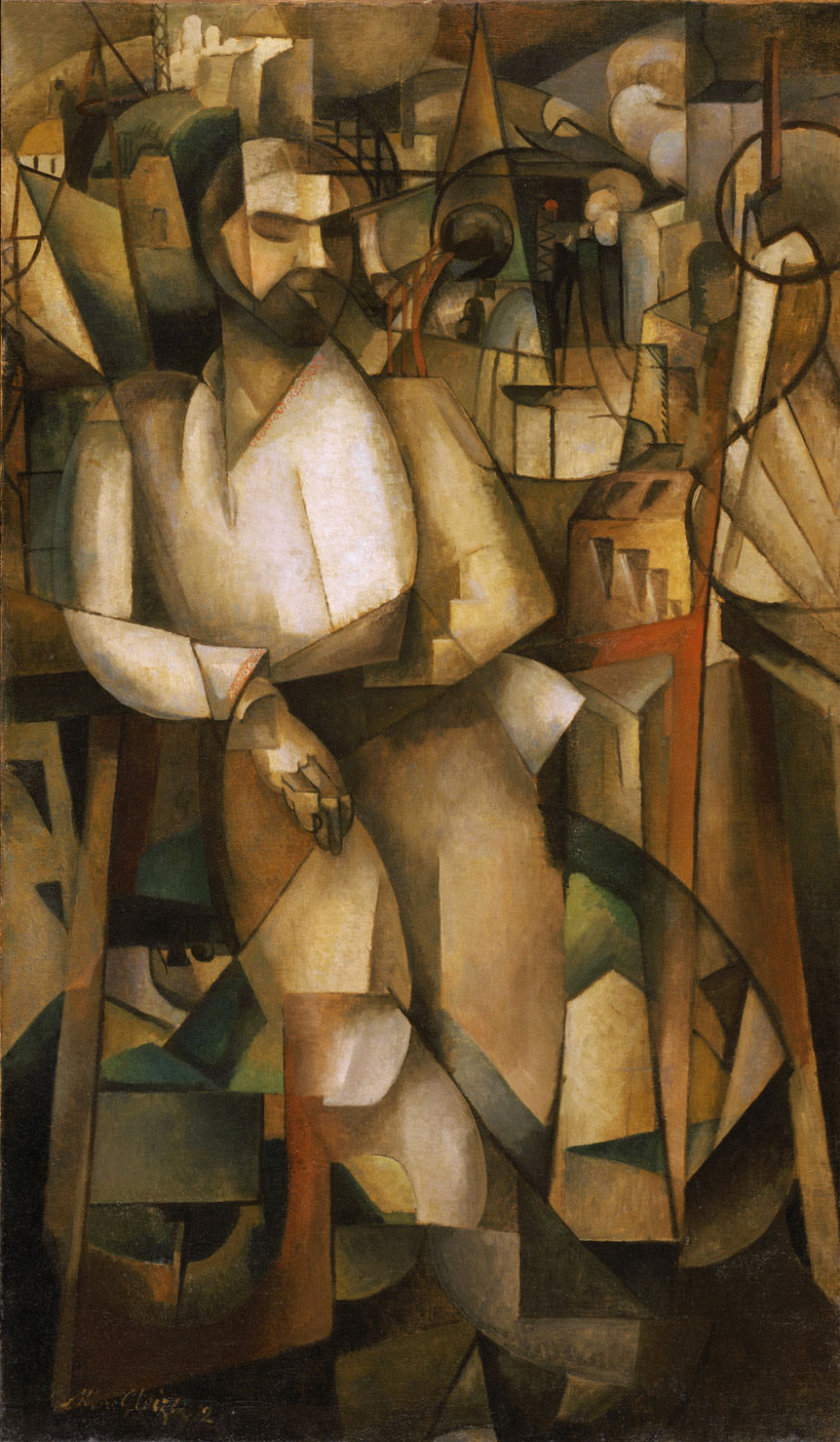
Albert Gleizes, 1912, l'Homme au Balcon, Man on a Balcony (Portrait of Dr. Théo Morinaud), Cubism

Jean Metzinger, 1912, Danseuse au café (Dancer in a café), Cubism

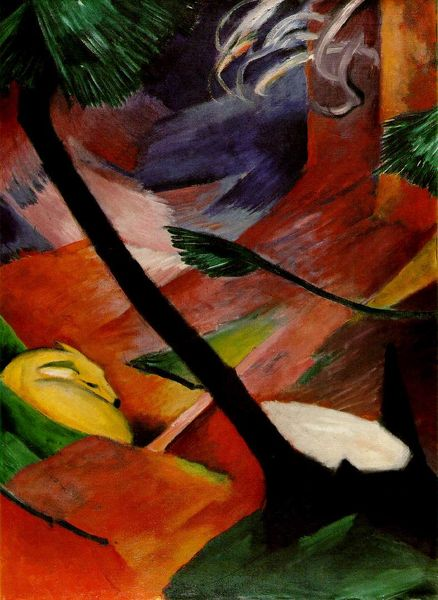
Franz Marc 1912, Der Blaue Reiter

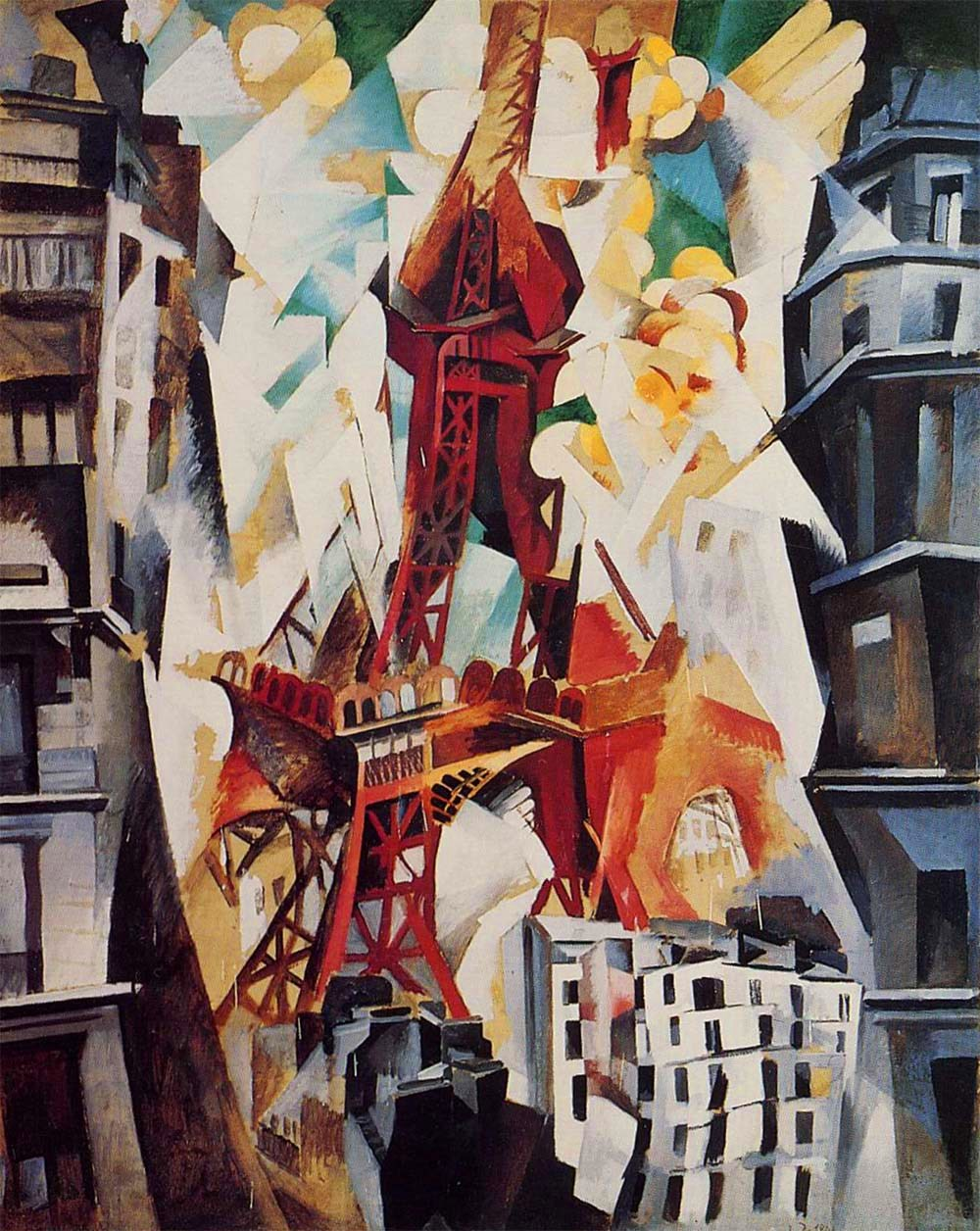
Robert Delaunay, 1911, Orphism

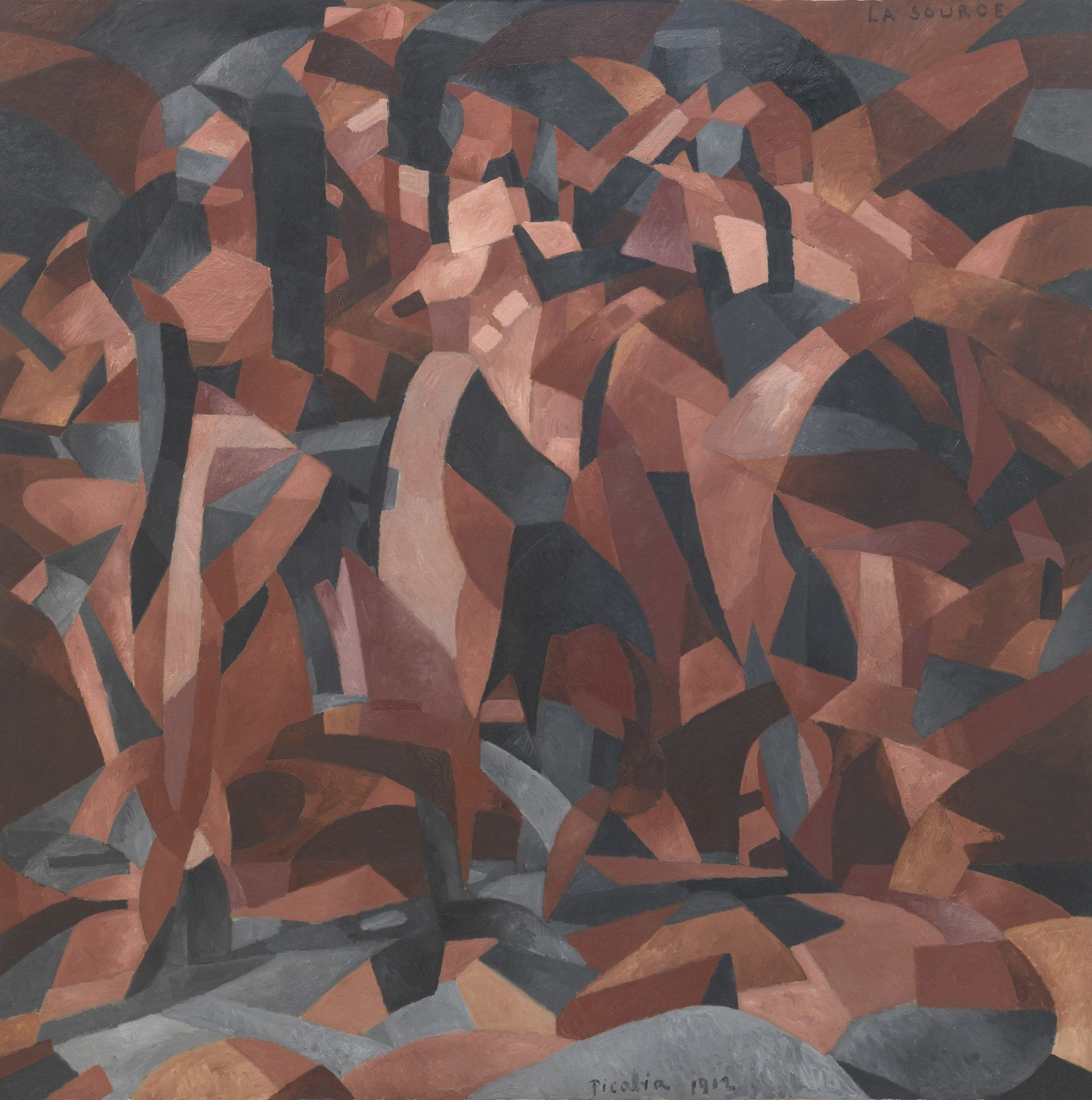
Francis Picabia, 1912, La Source (The Spring), Abstract art

Wassily Kandinsky 1913, birth of abstract art

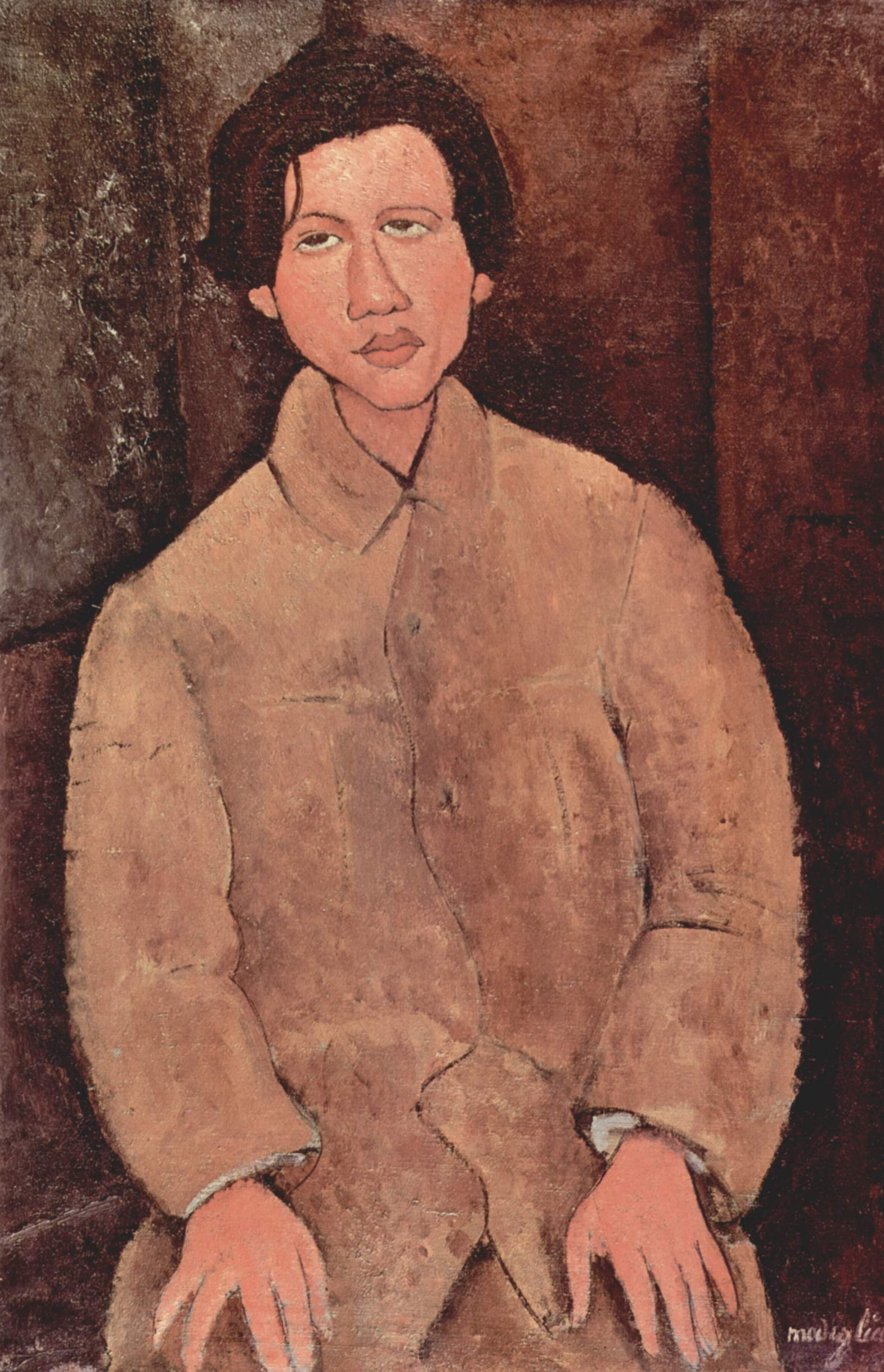
Amedeo Modigliani, Portrait of Soutine 1916, example of Expressionism

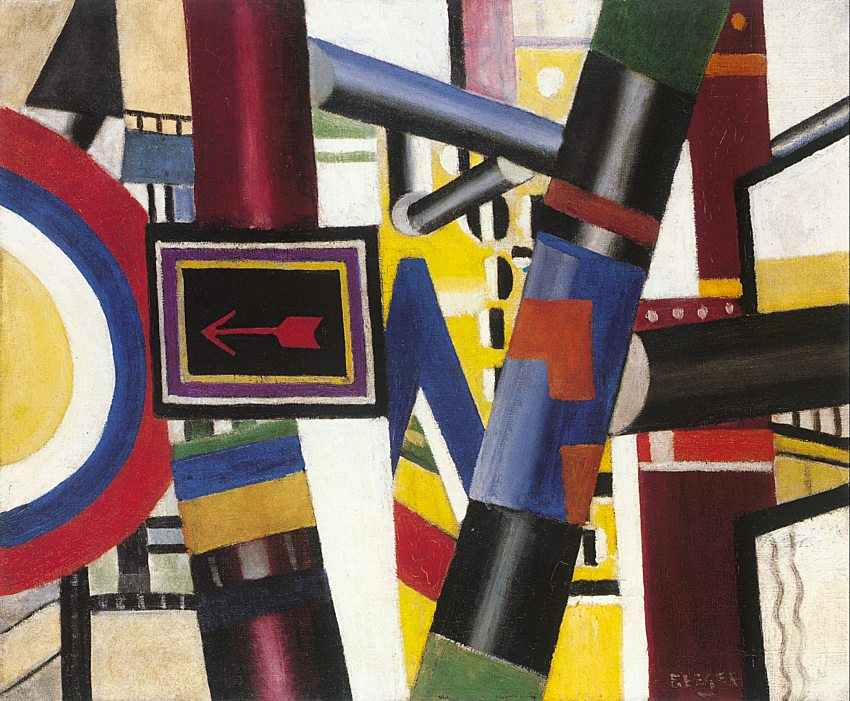
Fernand Léger 1919, synthetic Cubism, tubism

==== Pioneers of abstraction ====
Piet Mondrian's art was also related to his spiritual and philosophical studies. In 1908 he became interested in the theosophical movement launched by Helena Petrovna Blavatsky in the late 19th century. Blavatsky believed that it was possible to attain a knowledge of nature more profound than that provided by empirical means, and much of Mondrian's work for the rest of his life was inspired by his search for that spiritual knowledge.

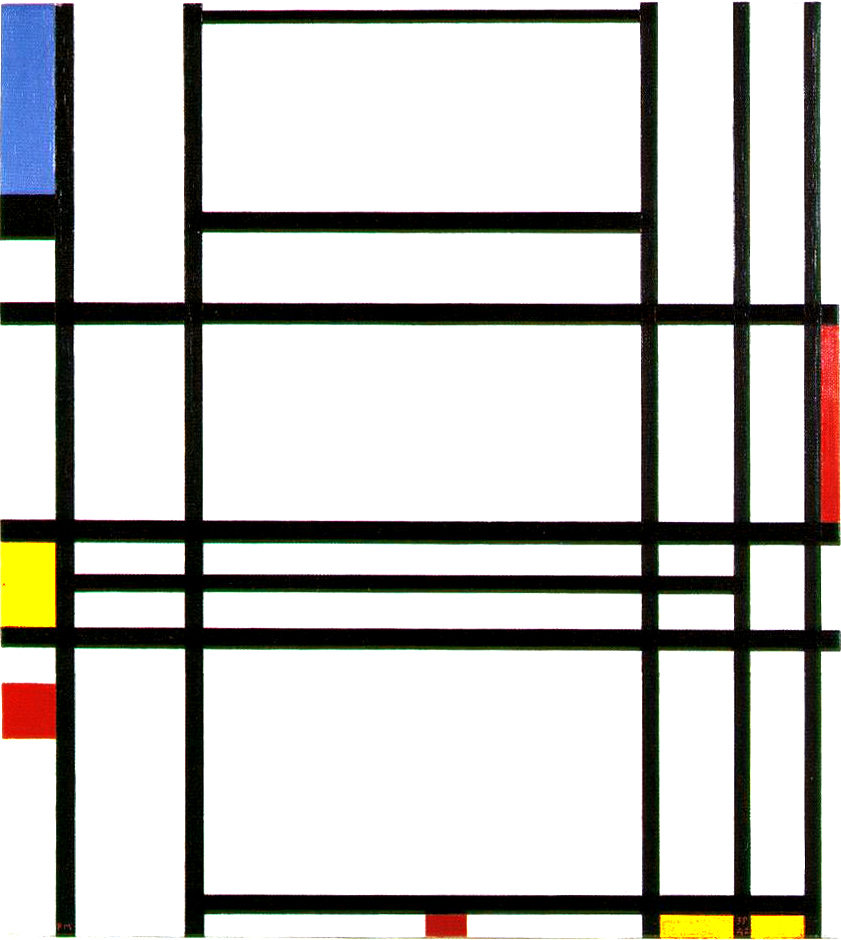
Piet Mondrian, "Composition No. 10" 1939–1942, De Stijl

De Stijl also known as neoplasticism, was a Dutch artistic movement founded in 1917. The term De Stijl is used to refer to a body of work from 1917 to 1931 founded in the Netherlands.

De Stijl is also the name of a journal that was published by the Dutch painter, designer, writer, and critic Theo van Doesburg propagating the group's theories. Next to van Doesburg, the group's principal members were the painters Piet Mondrian, Vilmos Huszár, and Bart van der Leck, and the architects Gerrit Rietveld, Robert van 't Hoff, and J. J. P. Oud. The artistic philosophy that formed a basis for the group's work is known as neoplasticism – the new plastic art (or Nieuwe Beelding in Dutch).

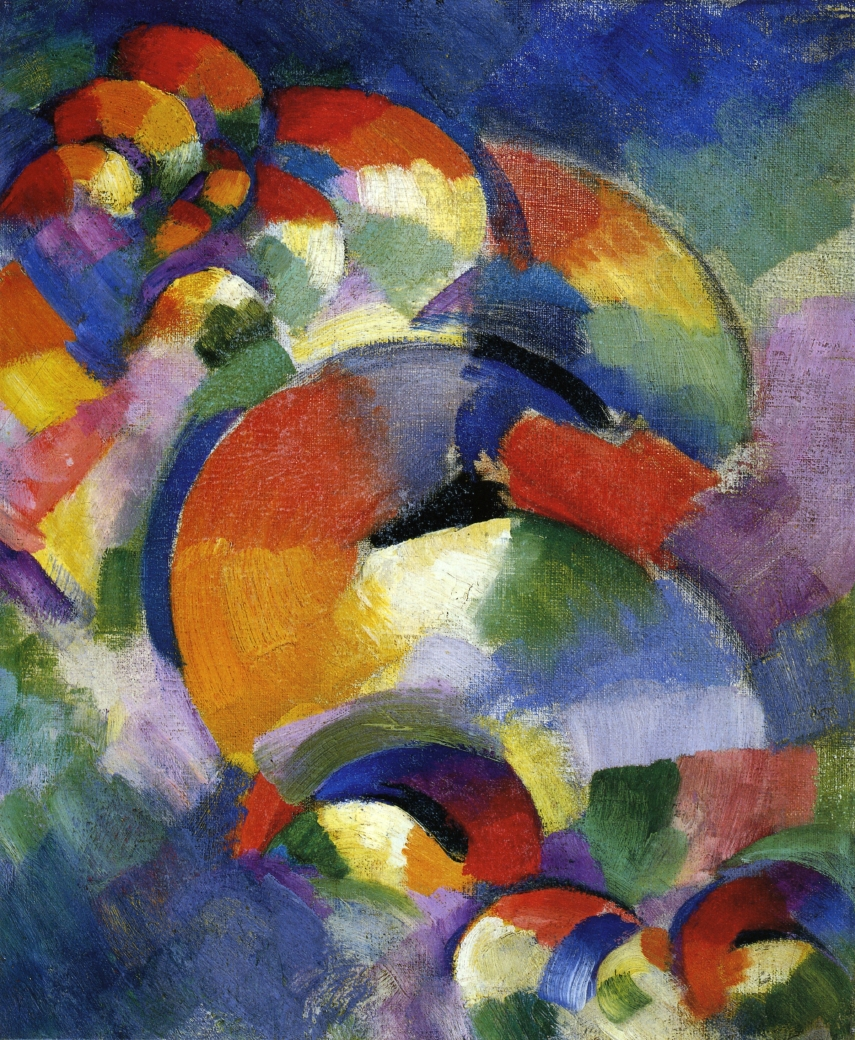
Morgan Russell, Cosmic Synchromy (1913–14), Synchromism

Proponents of De Stijl sought to express a new utopian ideal of spiritual harmony and order. They advocated pure abstraction and universality by a reduction to the essentials of form and colour; they simplified visual compositions to the vertical and horizontal directions, and used only primary colors along with black and white. Indeed, according to the Tate Gallery's online article on neoplasticism, Mondrian himself sets forth these delimitations in his essay "Neo-Plasticism in Pictorial Art". He writes, "... this new plastic idea will ignore the particulars of appearance, that is to say, natural form and colour. On the contrary, it should find its expression in the abstraction of form and colour, that is to say, in the straight line and the clearly defined primary colour." The Tate article further summarizes that this art allows "only primary colours and non-colours, only squares and rectangles, only straight and horizontal or vertical line." The Guggenheim Museum's online article on De Stijl summarizes these traits in similar terms: "It [De Stijl] was posited on the fundamental principle of the geometry of the straight line, the square, and the rectangle, combined with a strong asymmetricality; the predominant use of pure primary colors with black and white; and the relationship between positive and negative elements in an arrangement of non-objective forms and lines."

De Stijl movement was influenced by Cubist painting as well as by the mysticism and the ideas about "ideal" geometric forms (such as the "perfect straight line") in the neoplatonic philosophy of mathematician M. H. J. Schoenmaekers. The works of De Stijl would influence the Bauhaus style and the international style of architecture as well as clothing and interior design. However, it did not follow the general guidelines of an "ism" (Cubism, Futurism, Surrealism), nor did it adhere to the principles of art schools like Bauhaus; it was a collective project, a joint enterprise.

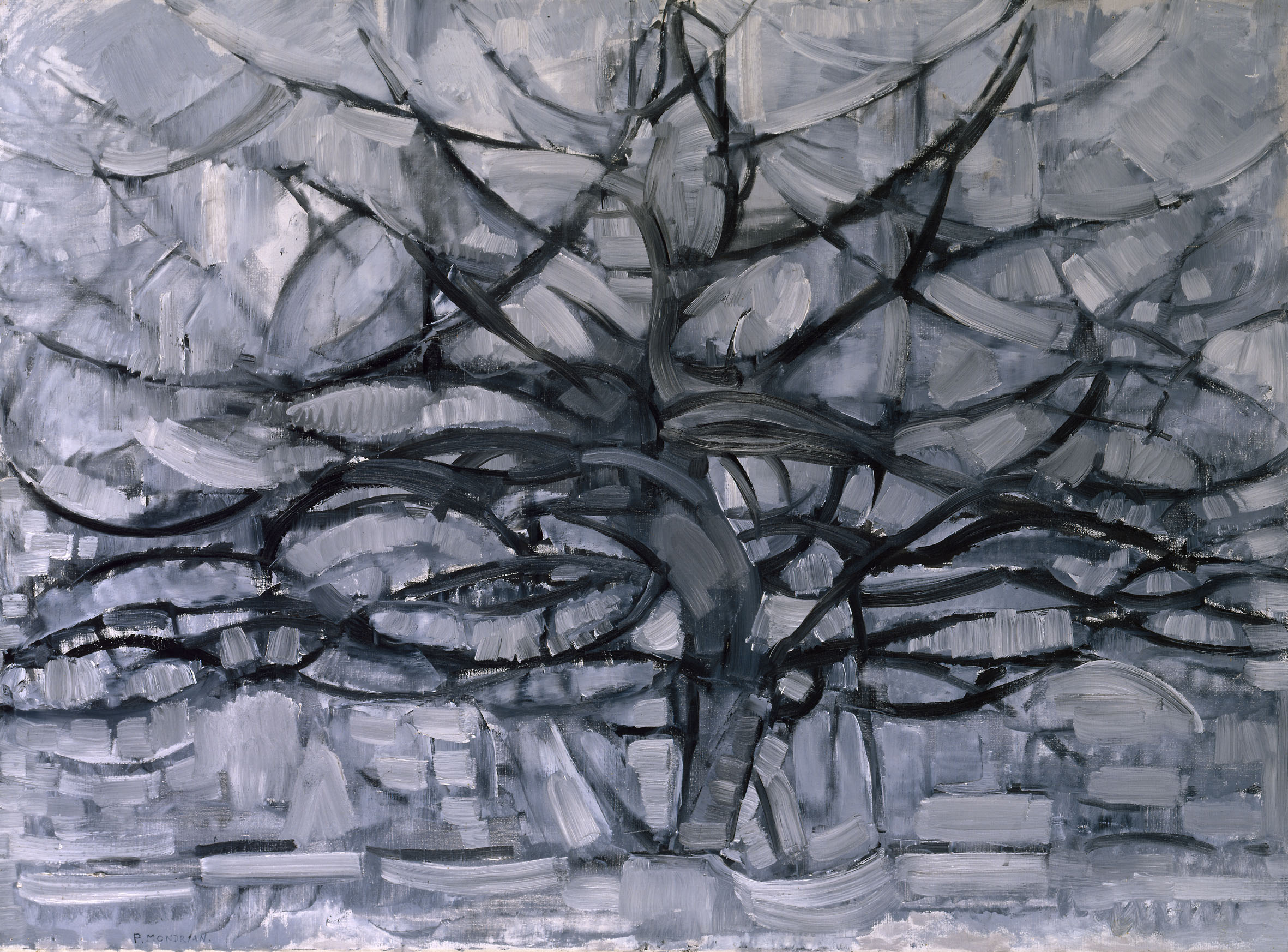
Piet Mondrian, 1912, early De Stijl

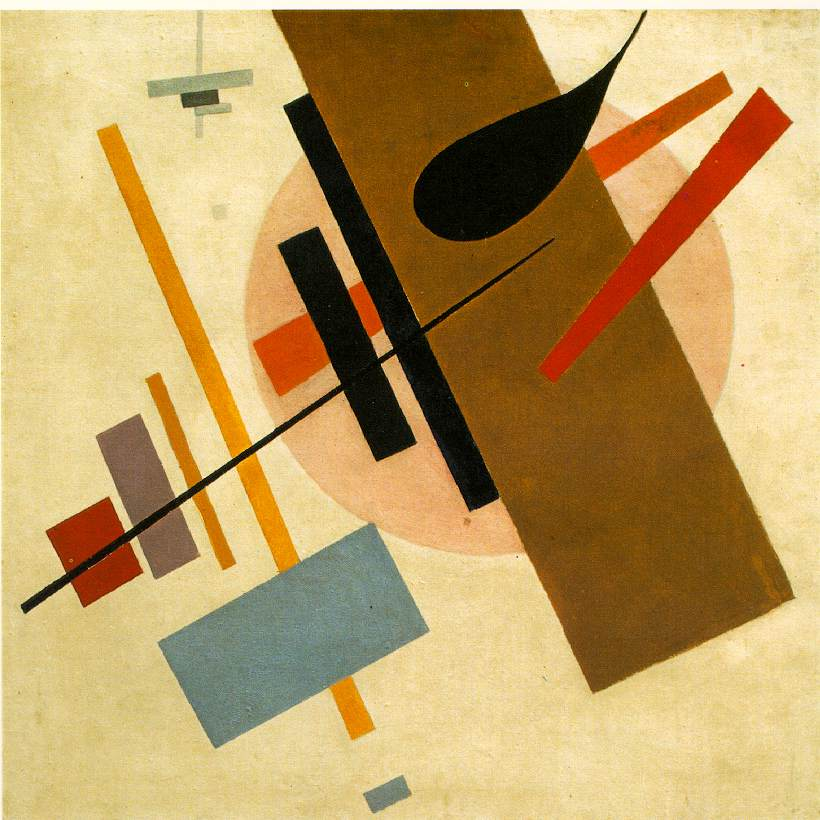
Kasimir Malevich 1916, Suprematism

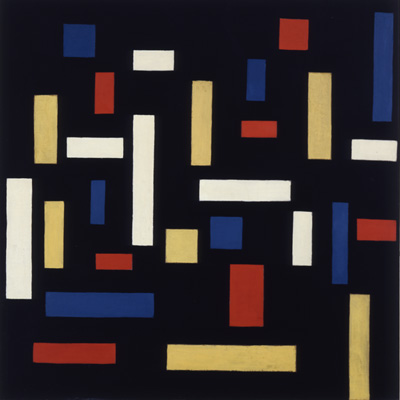
Theo van Doesburg 1917, De Stijl, Neo-Plasticism

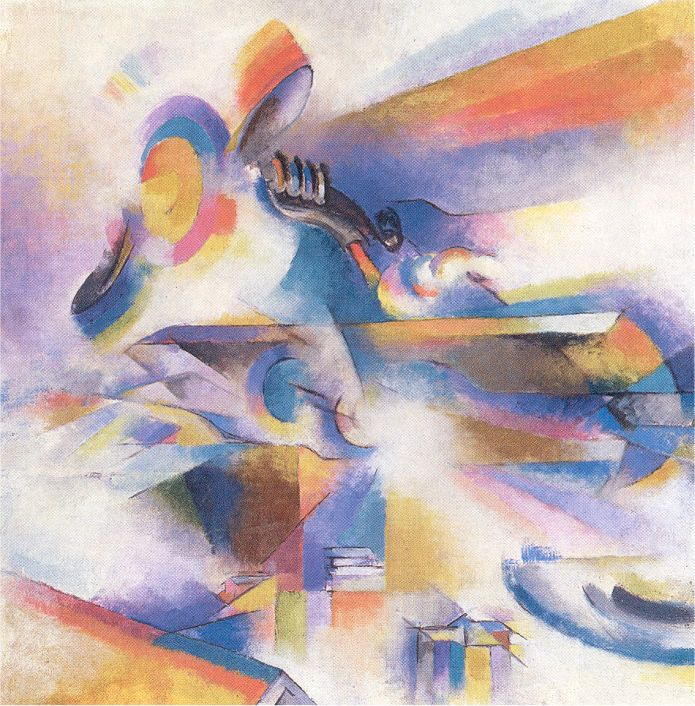
Stanton Macdonald-Wright 1920, Synchromism

==== Dada and Surrealism ====
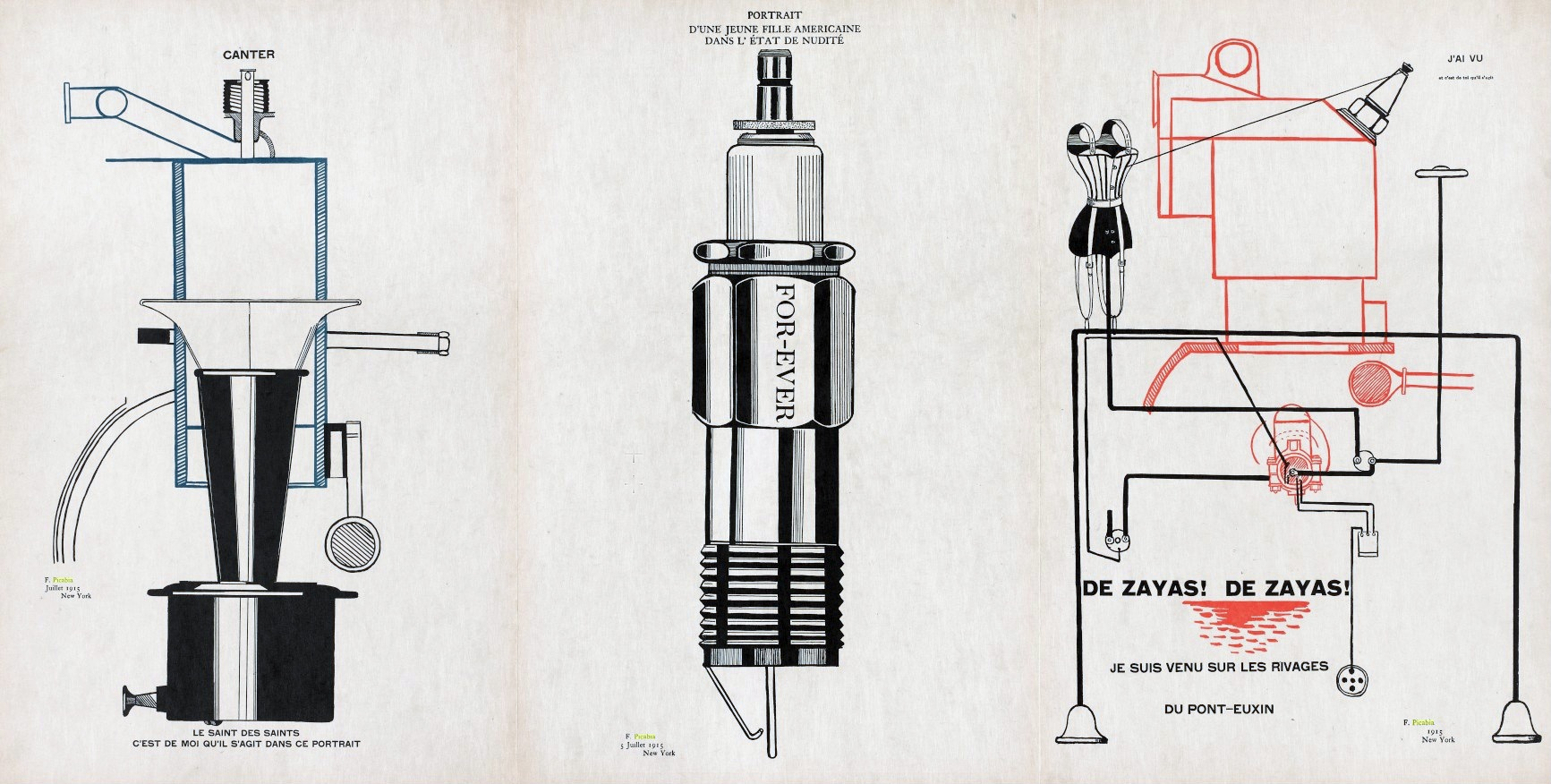
Francis Picabia, (Left) Le saint des saints c'est de moi qu'il s'agit dans ce portrait, 1 July 1915; (center) Portrait d'une jeune fille americaine dans l'état de nudité, 5 July 1915: (right) J'ai vu et c'est de toi qu'il s'agit, De Zayas! De Zayas! Je suis venu sur les rivages du Pont-Euxin, New York, 1915

Marcel Duchamp, Nude Descending a Staircase, No. 2, 1912, Philadelphia Museum of Art

Joan Miró, Horse, Pipe and Red Flower, 1920, abstract Surrealism, Philadelphia Museum of Art

Marcel Duchamp, came to international prominence in the wake of his notorious success at the New York City Armory Show in 1913, (soon after he denounced artmaking for chess). After Duchamp's Nude Descending a Staircase became the international cause celebre at the 1913 Armory show in New York he created The Bride Stripped Bare by Her Bachelors, Even, Large Glass. The Large Glass pushed the art of painting to radical new limits being part painting, part collage, part construction. Duchamp became closely associated with the Dada movement that began in neutral Zürich, Switzerland, during World War I and peaked from 1916 to 1920. The movement primarily involved visual arts, literature (poetry, art manifestoes, art theory), theatre, and graphic design, and concentrated its anti war politic through a rejection of the prevailing standards in art through anti-art cultural works. Francis Picabia, Man Ray, Kurt Schwitters, Tristan Tzara, Hans Richter, Jean Arp, Sophie Taeuber-Arp, along with Duchamp and many others are associated with the Dadaist movement. Duchamp and several Dadaists are also associated with Surrealism, the movement that dominated European painting in the 1920s and 1930s.

In 1924 André Breton published the Surrealist Manifesto. The Surrealist movement in painting became synonymous with the avant-garde and which featured artists whose works varied from the abstract to the super-realist. With works on paper like Machine Turn Quickly, (above) Francis Picabia continued his involvement in the Dada movement through 1919 in Zürich and Paris, before breaking away from it after developing an interest in Surrealist art. Yves Tanguy, René Magritte and Salvador Dalí are particularly known for their realistic depictions of dream imagery and fantastic manifestations of the imagination. Joan Miró's The Tilled Field of 1923–1924 verges on abstraction, this early painting of a complex of objects and figures, and arrangements of sexually active characters; was Miró's first Surrealist masterpiece. Miró's The Tilled Field also contains several parallels to Bosch's Garden of Earthly Delights: similar flocks of birds; pools from which living creatures emerge; and oversize disembodied ears all echo the Dutch master's work that Miró saw as a young painter in The Prado. The more abstract Joan Miró, Jean Arp, André Masson, and Max Ernst were very influential, especially in the United States during the 1940s. Throughout the 1930s, Surrealism continued to become more visible to the public at large. A Surrealist group developed in Britain and, according to Breton, their 1936 London International Surrealist Exhibition was a high water mark of the period and became the model for international exhibitions. Surrealist groups in Japan, and especially in Latin America, the Caribbean and in Mexico produced innovative and original works.

Dalí and Magritte created some of the most widely recognized images of the movement. The 1928/1929 painting This Is Not A Pipe, by Magritte is the subject of a Michel Foucault 1973 book, This is not a Pipe (English edition, 1991), that discusses the painting and its paradox. Dalí joined the group in 1929, and participated in the rapid establishment of the visual style between 1930 and 1935.

1931 marked a year when several Surrealist painters produced works which marked turning points in their stylistic evolution: in one example, liquid shapes become the trademark of Dalí, particularly in his The Persistence of Memory, which features the image of watches that sag as if they are melting. Evocations of time and its compelling mystery and absurdity.

The characteristics of this style – a combination of the depictive, the abstract, and the psychological – came to stand for the alienation which many people felt in the modernist period, combined with the sense of reaching more deeply into the psyche, to be "made whole with one's individuality."

Max Ernst studied philosophy and psychology in Bonn and was interested in the alternative realities experienced by the insane. His paintings may have been inspired by the psychoanalyst Sigmund Freud's study of the delusions of a paranoiac, Daniel Paul Schreber.

During the 1920s André Masson's work was enormously influential in helping the newly arrived in Paris and young artist Joan Miró find his roots in the new Surrealist painting. Miró acknowledged in letters to his dealer Pierre Matisse the importance of Masson as an example to him in his early years in Paris.

Long after personal, political and professional tensions have fragmented the Surrealist group into thin air and ether, Magritte, Miró, Dalí and the other Surrealists continue to define a visual program in the arts. Other prominent surrealist artists include Giorgio de Chirico, Méret Oppenheim, Toyen, Grégoire Michonze, Roberto Matta, Kay Sage, Leonora Carrington, Dorothea Tanning, and Leonor Fini among others.

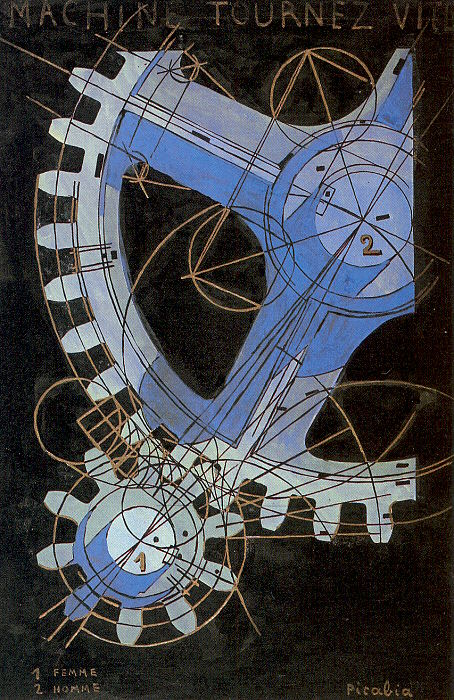
Francis Picabia 1916, Dada

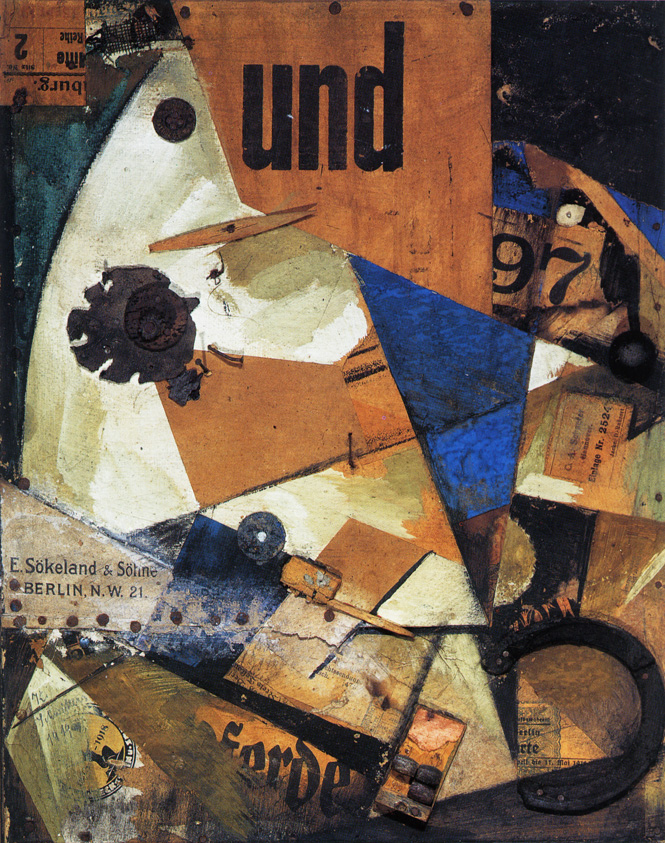
Kurt Schwitters, 1919, painted collage, Dada

Max Ernst, 1921, Surrealism

André Masson, 1922, early Surrealism

==== Before and after the war ====
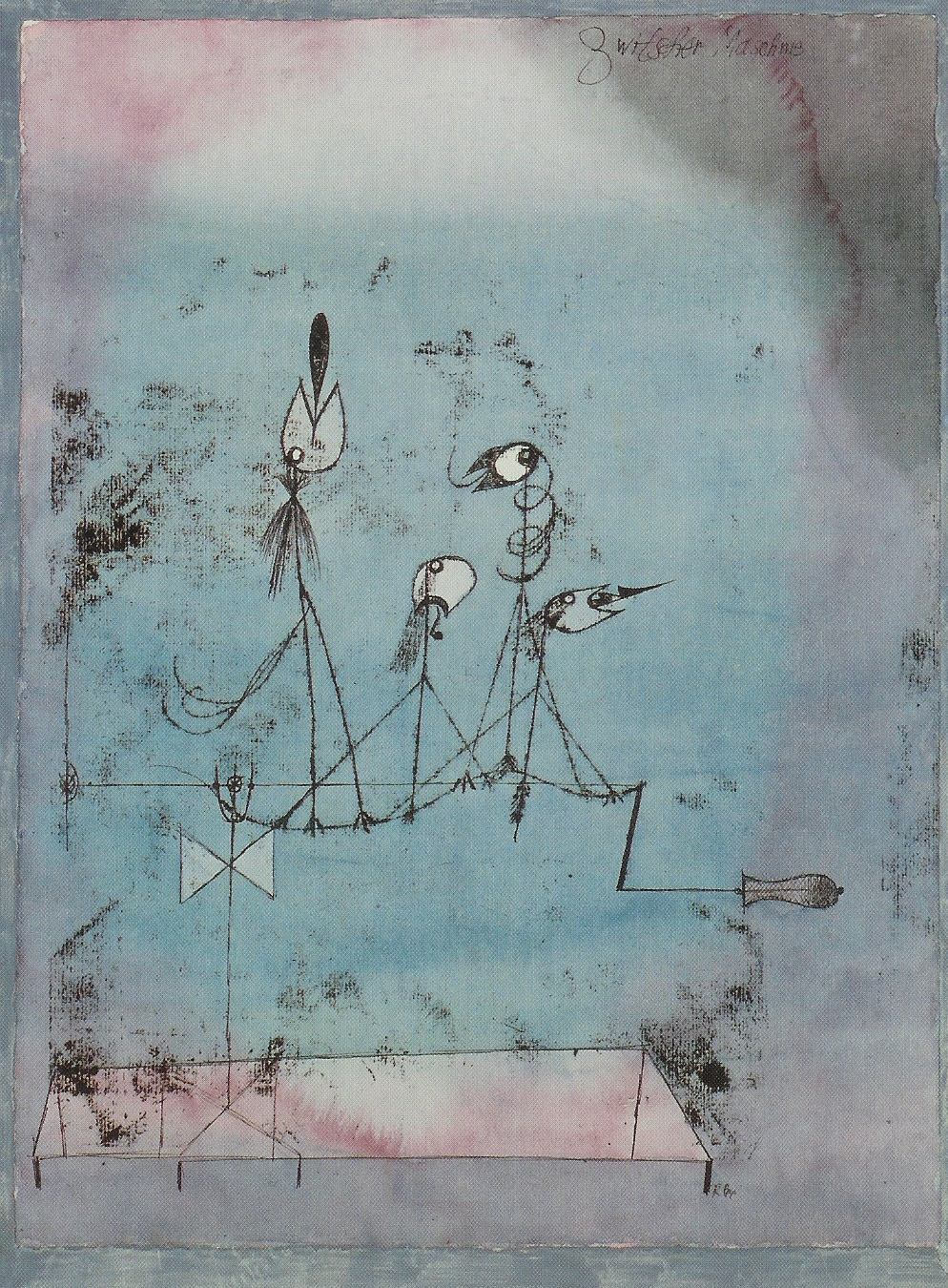
Paul Klee, 1922, Bauhaus

Der Blaue Reiter was a German movement lasting from 1911 to 1914, fundamental to Expressionism, along with Die Brücke which was founded the previous decade in 1905 and was a group of German expressionist artists formed in Dresden in 1905. Founding members of Die Brücke were Fritz Bleyl, Erich Heckel, Ernst Ludwig Kirchner and Karl Schmidt-Rottluff. Later members included Max Pechstein, Otto Mueller and others. The group was one of the seminal ones, which in due course had a major impact on the evolution of modern art in the 20th century and created the style of Expressionism.

Wassily Kandinsky, Franz Marc, August Macke, Alexej von Jawlensky, Marianne von Werefkin, Lyonel Feininger and others founded the Der Blaue Reiter group in response to the rejection of Kandinsky's painting Last Judgement from an exhibition. Der Blaue Reiter lacked a central artistic manifesto, but was centered around Kandinsky and Marc. Artists Gabriele Münter and Paul Klee were also involved.

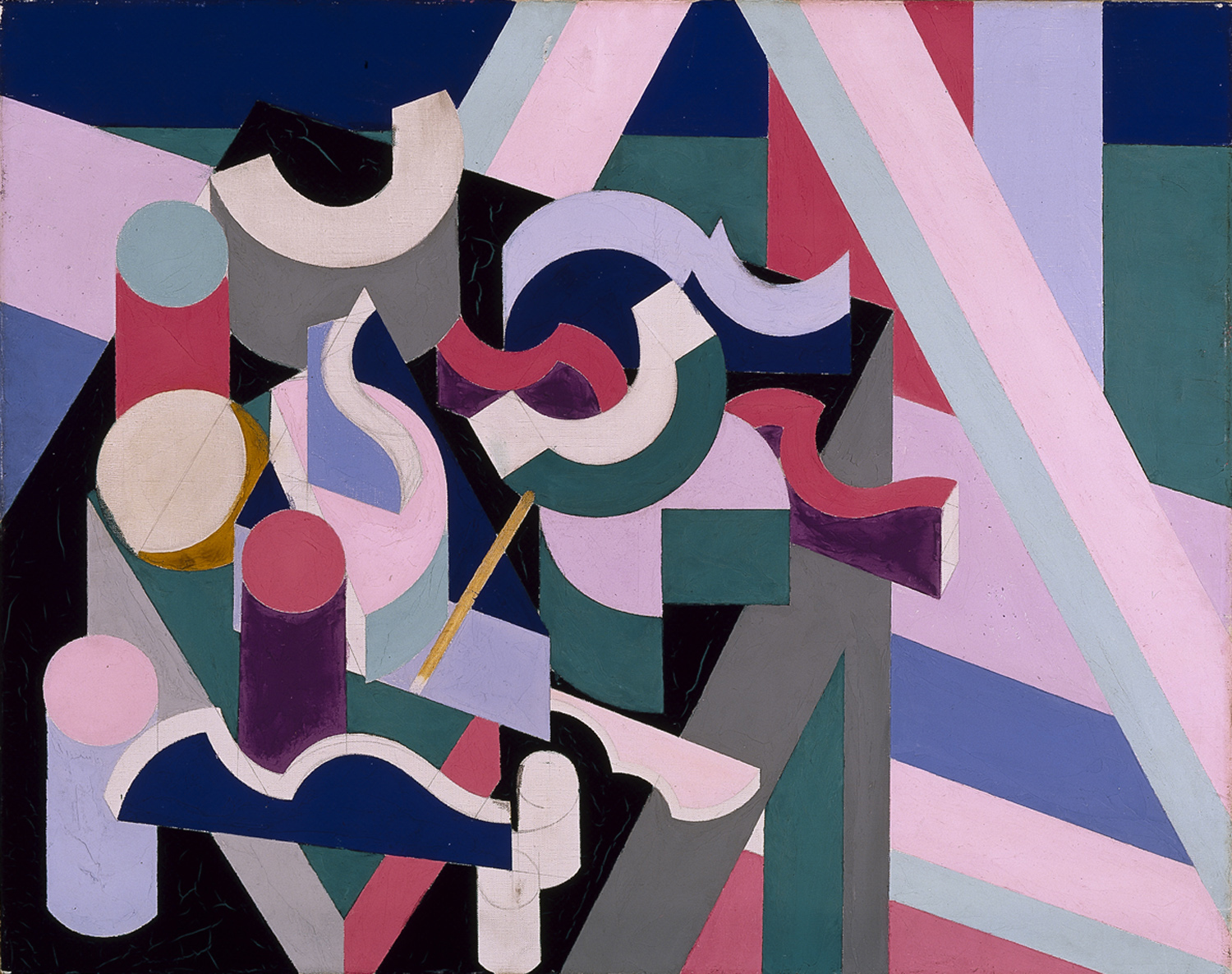
Patrick Henry Bruce, American modernism, 1924

The name of the movement comes from a painting by Kandinsky created in 1903. It is also claimed that the name could have derived from Marc's enthusiasm for horses and Kandinsky's love of the colour blue. For Kandinsky, blue is the colour of spirituality: the darker the blue, the more it awakens human desire for the eternal.

In the USA during the period between World War I and World War II painters tended to go to Europe for recognition. Artists like Marsden Hartley, Patrick Henry Bruce, Gerald Murphy and Stuart Davis, created reputations abroad. In New York City, Albert Pinkham Ryder and Ralph Blakelock were influential and important figures in advanced American painting between 1900 and 1920. During the 1920s photographer Alfred Stieglitz exhibited Georgia O'Keeffe, Arthur Dove, Alfred Henry Maurer, Charles Demuth, John Marin and other artists including European Masters Henri Matisse, Auguste Rodin, Henri Rousseau, Paul Cézanne, and Pablo Picasso, at his gallery the 291.

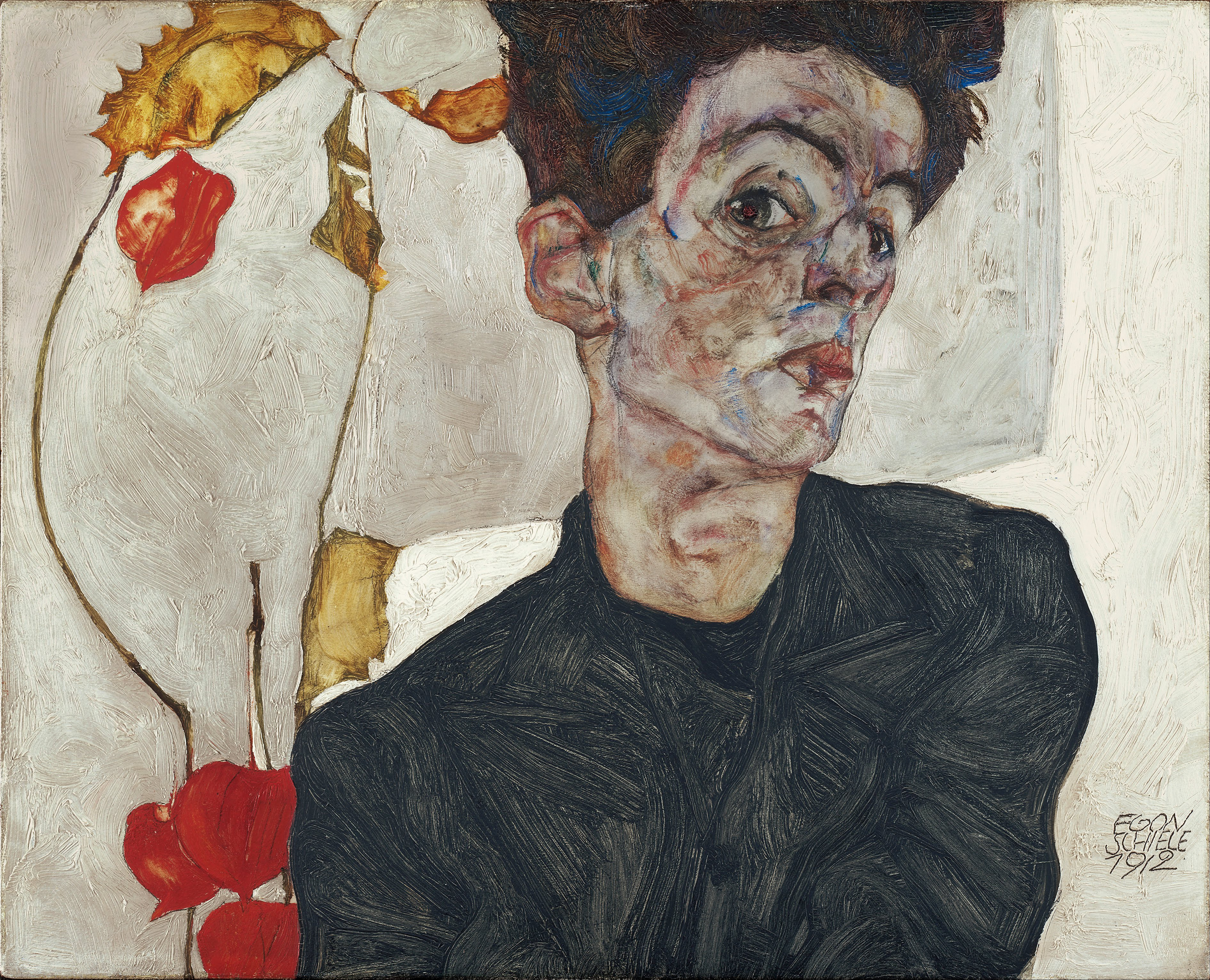
Egon Schiele, Symbolism and Expressionism 1912

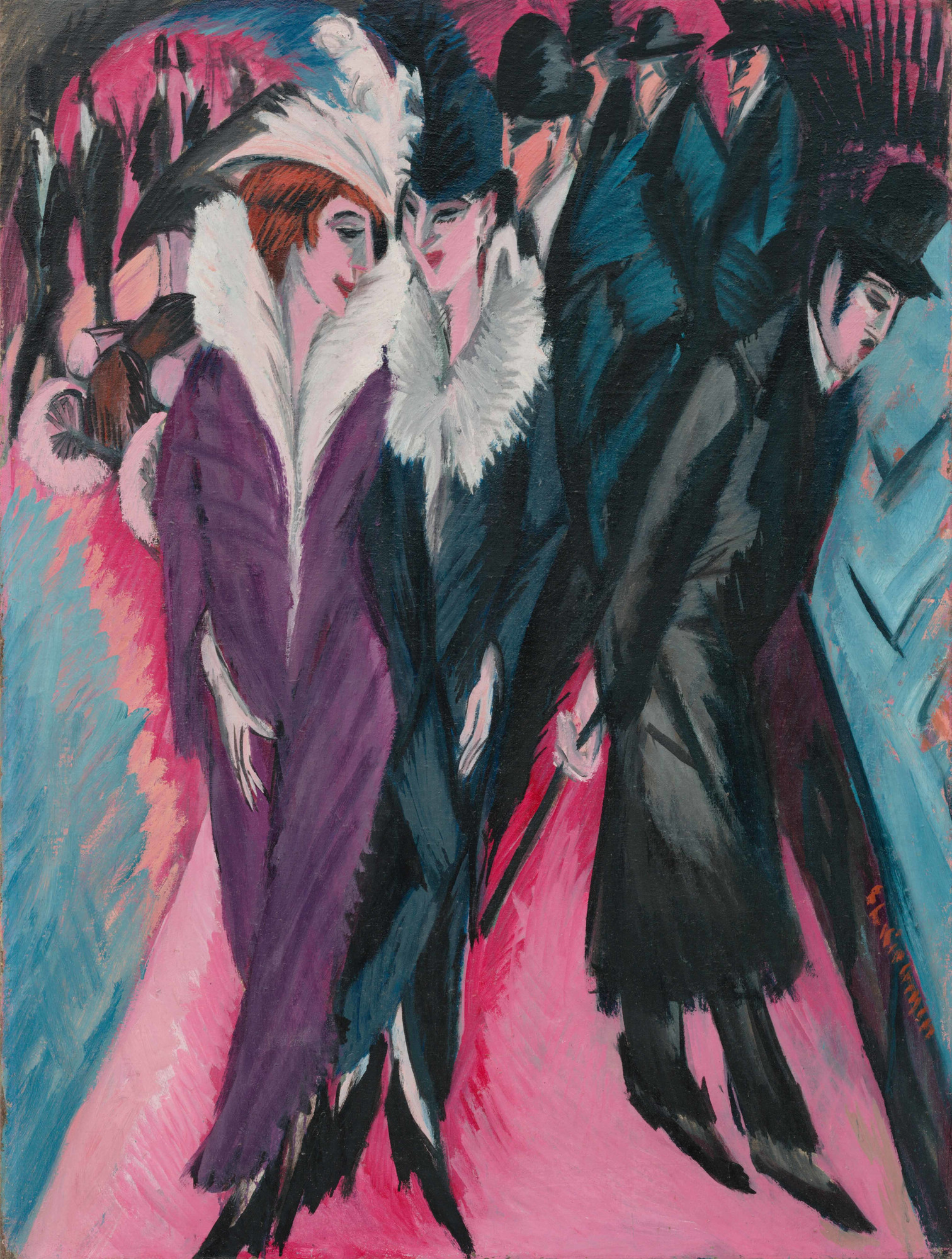
Ernst Kirchner, Die Brücke 1913

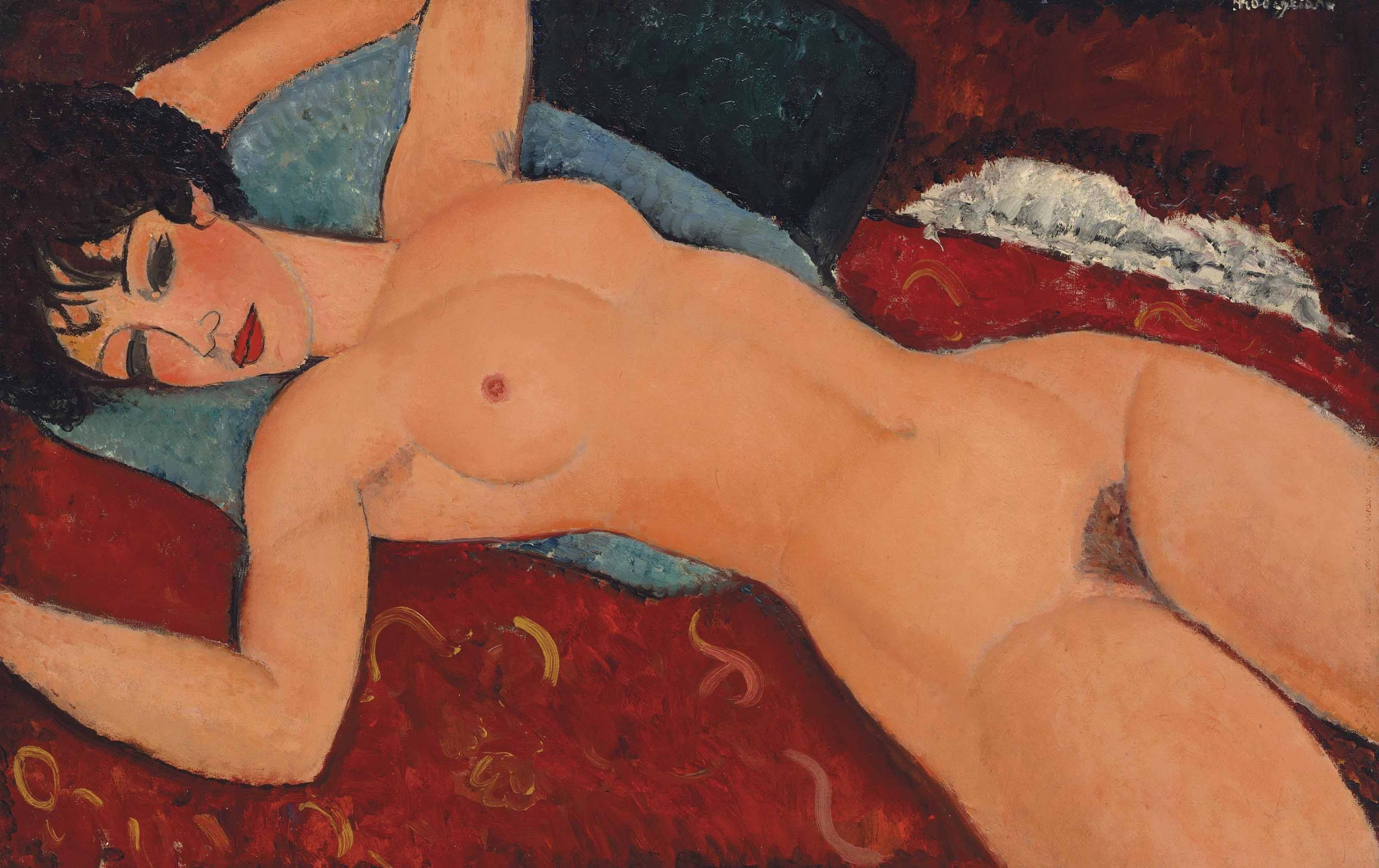
Amedeo Modigliani Symbolism and Expressionism 1917

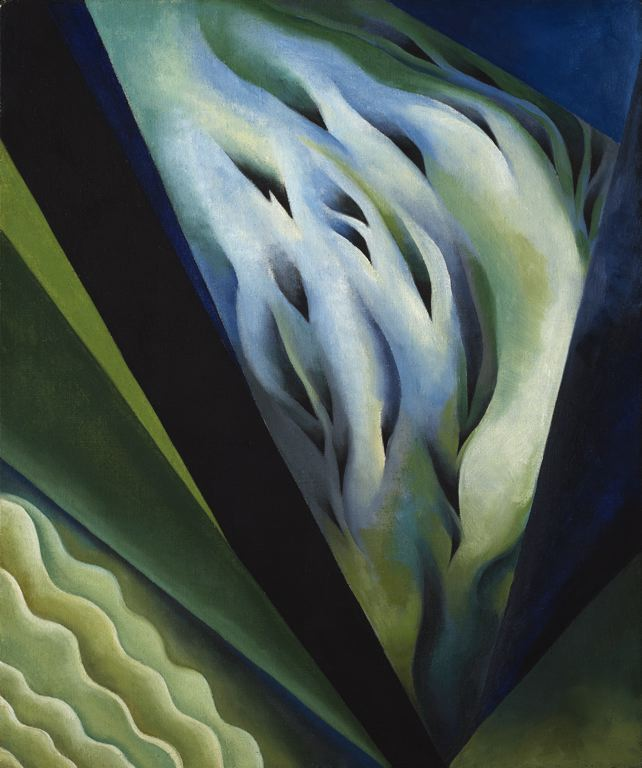
Georgia O'Keeffe, American Modernism, 1921

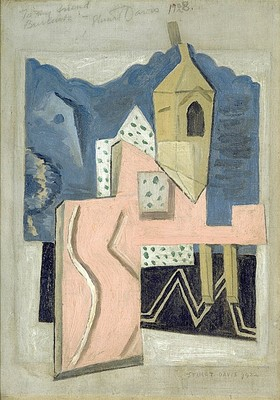
Stuart Davis, American Modernism 1922

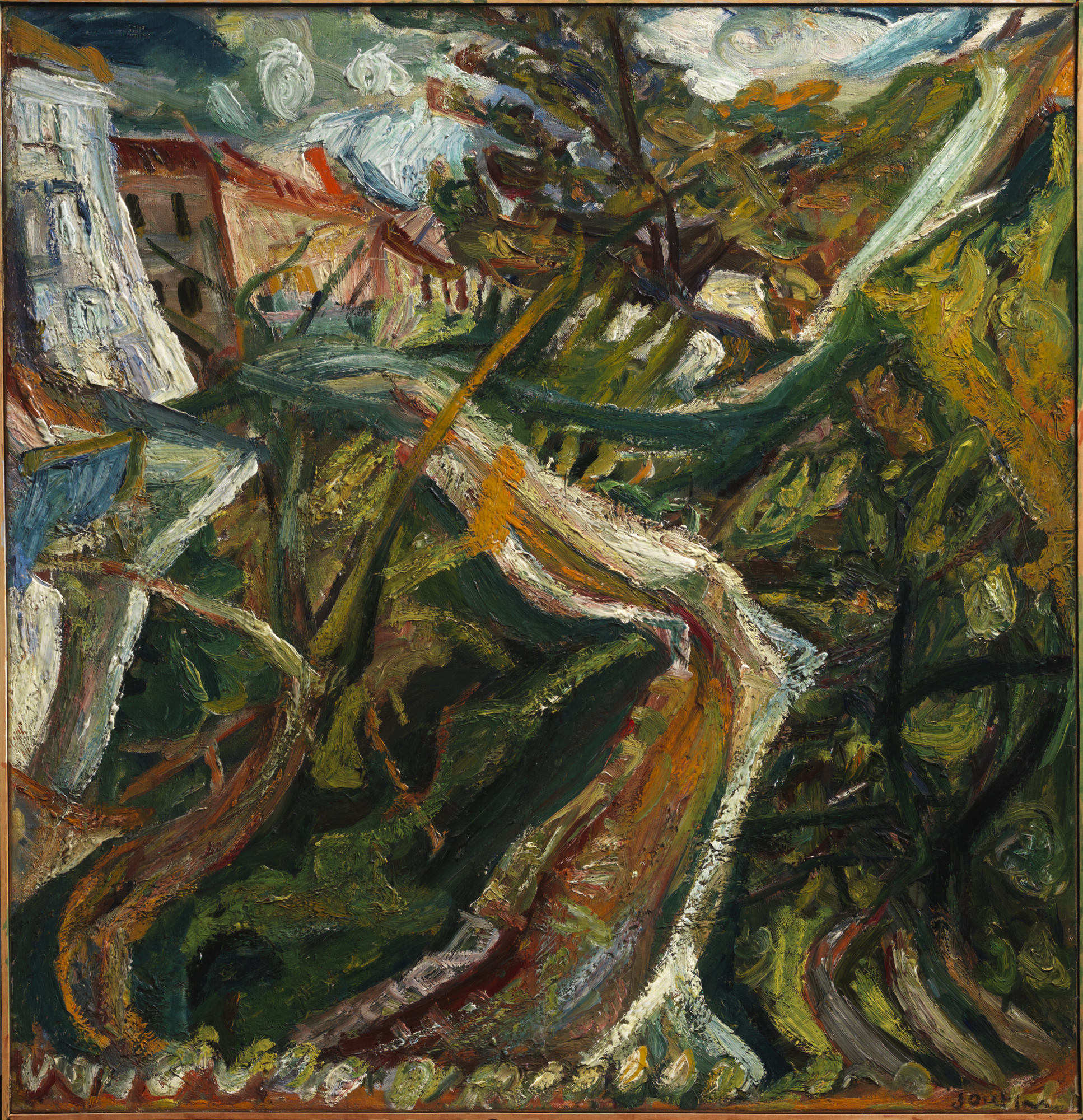
Chaïm Soutine, Expressionism, c. 1920

==== Social consciousness ====
George Grosz, 1920, Neue Sachlichkeit

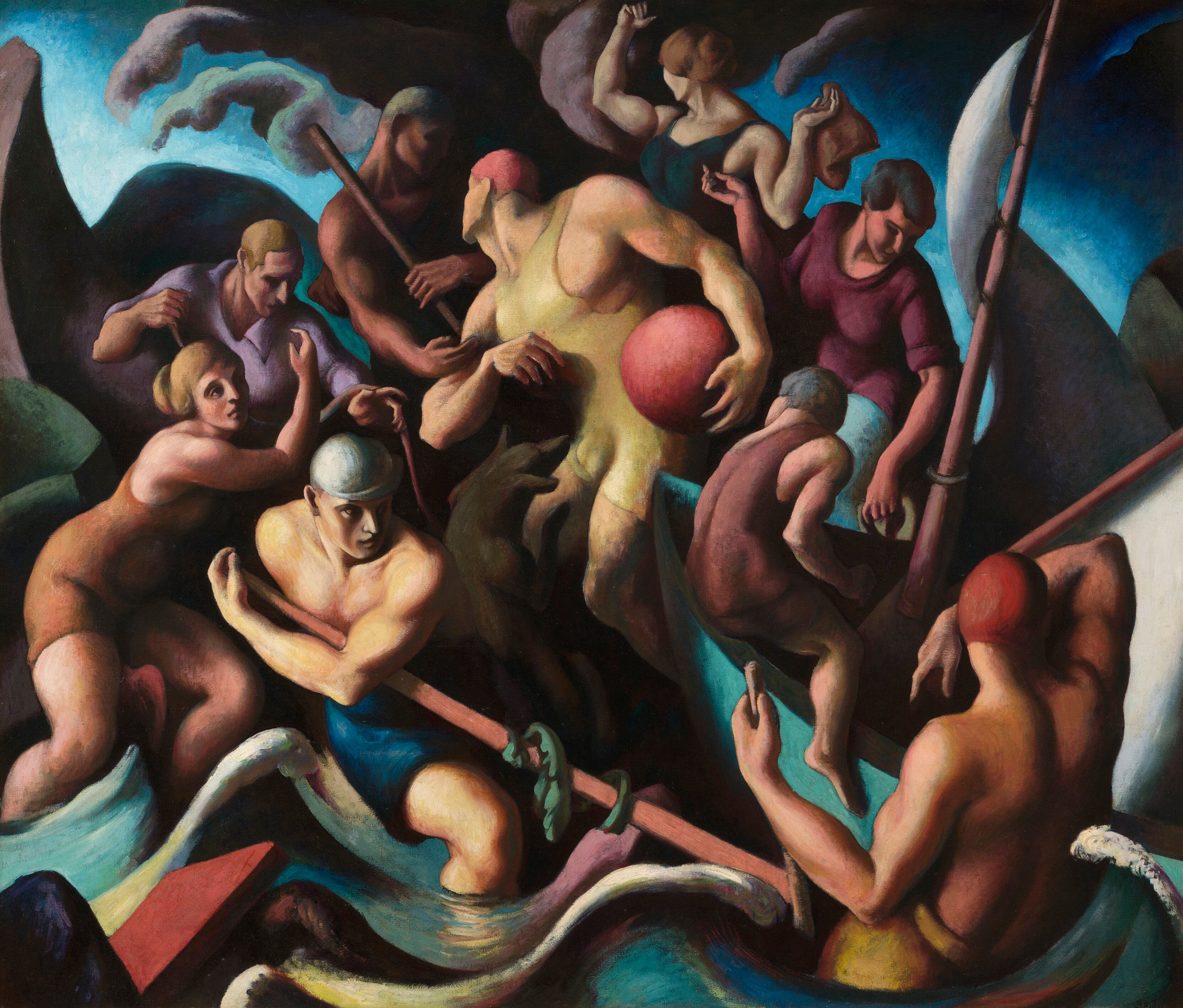
Thomas Hart Benton 1920, Regionalism

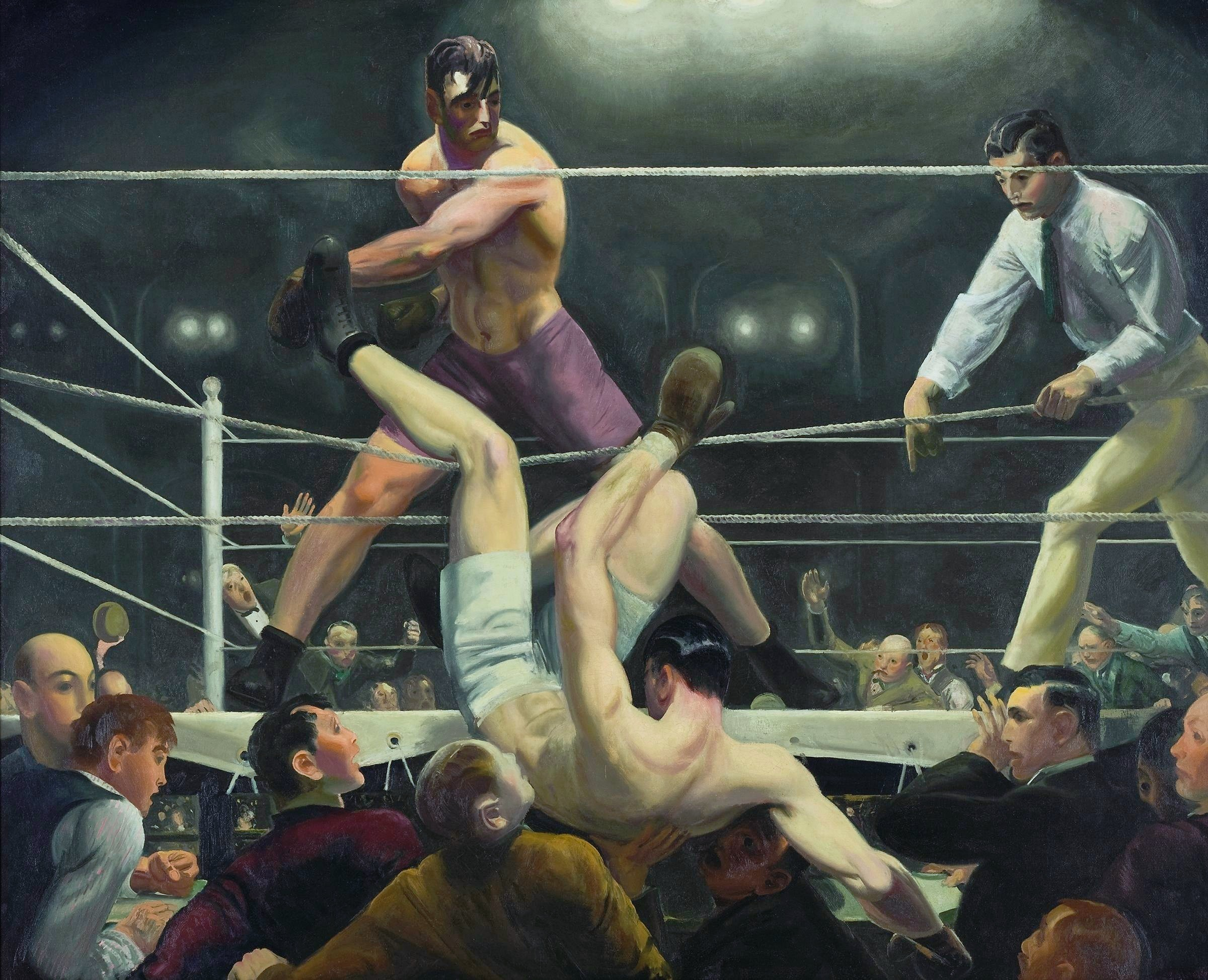
George Bellows, 1924, American realism

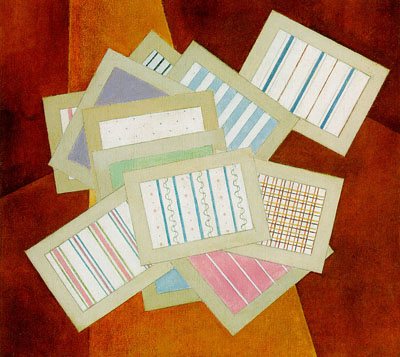
Charles Demuth Spring, 1921, American Precisionism (proto Pop Art)

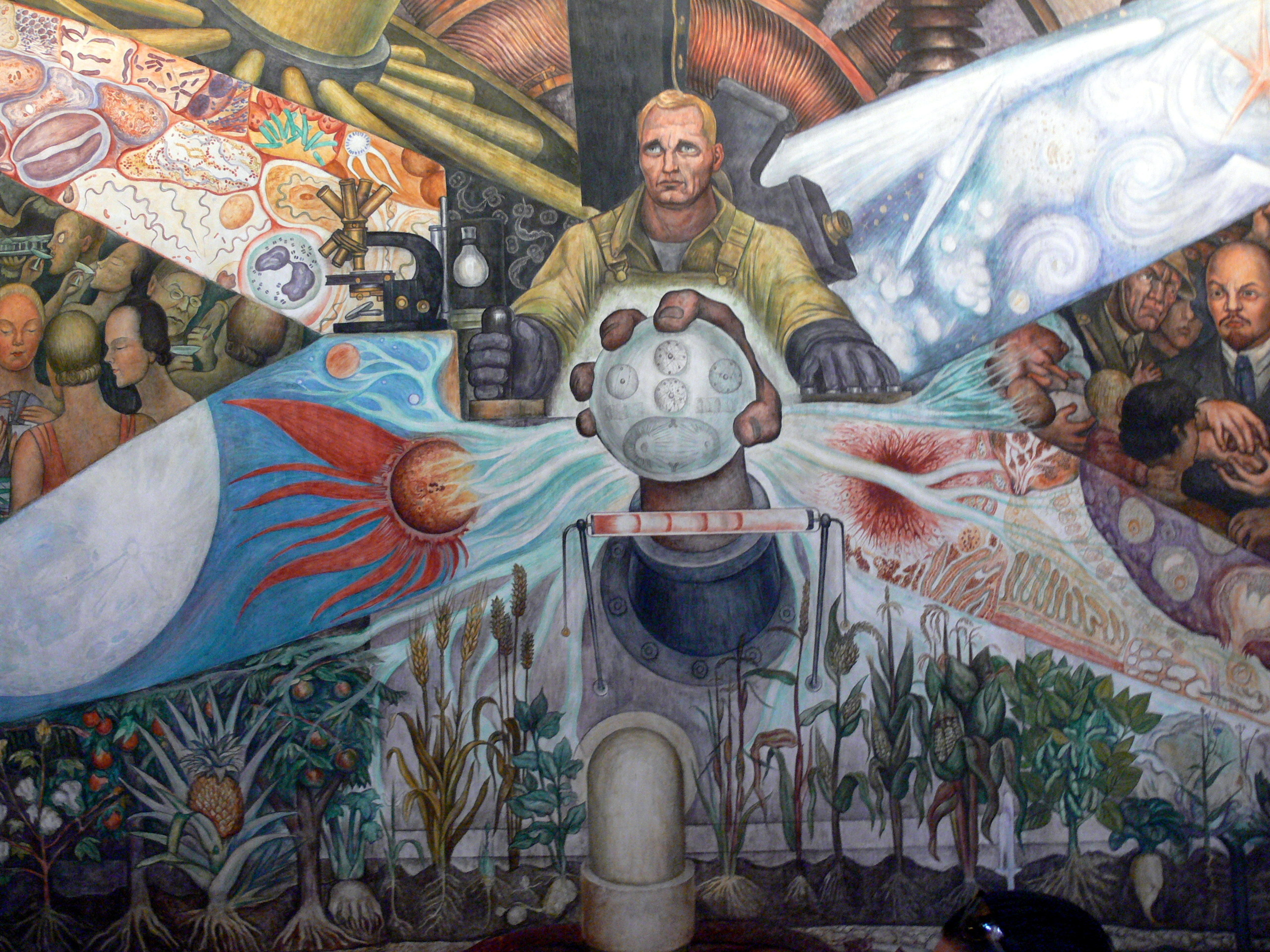
Diego Rivera, Recreation of Man at the Crossroads (renamed Man, Controller of the Universe), originally created in 1934, Mexican muralism movement

During the 1920s and the 1930s and the Great Depression, Surrealism, late Cubism, the Bauhaus, De Stijl, Dada, German Expressionism, Expressionism, and modernist and masterful color painters like Henri Matisse and Pierre Bonnard characterized the European art scene. In Germany Max Beckmann, Otto Dix, George Grosz and others politicized their paintings, foreshadowing the coming of World War II. While in America American Scene painting and the social realism and regionalism movements that contained both political and social commentary dominated the art world. Artists like Ben Shahn, Thomas Hart Benton, Grant Wood, George Tooker, John Steuart Curry, Reginald Marsh, and others became prominent. In Latin America besides the Uruguayan painter Joaquín Torres García and Rufino Tamayo from Mexico, the muralist movement with Diego Rivera, David Siqueiros, José Orozco, Pedro Nel Gómez and Santiago Martinez Delgado and the Symbolist paintings by Frida Kahlo began a renaissance of the arts for the region, with a use of color and historic, and political messages. Frida Kahlo's Symbolist works also relate strongly to Surrealism and to the Magic Realism movement in literature. The psychological drama in many of Kahlo's self portraits (above) underscore the vitality and relevance of her paintings to artists in the 21st century.

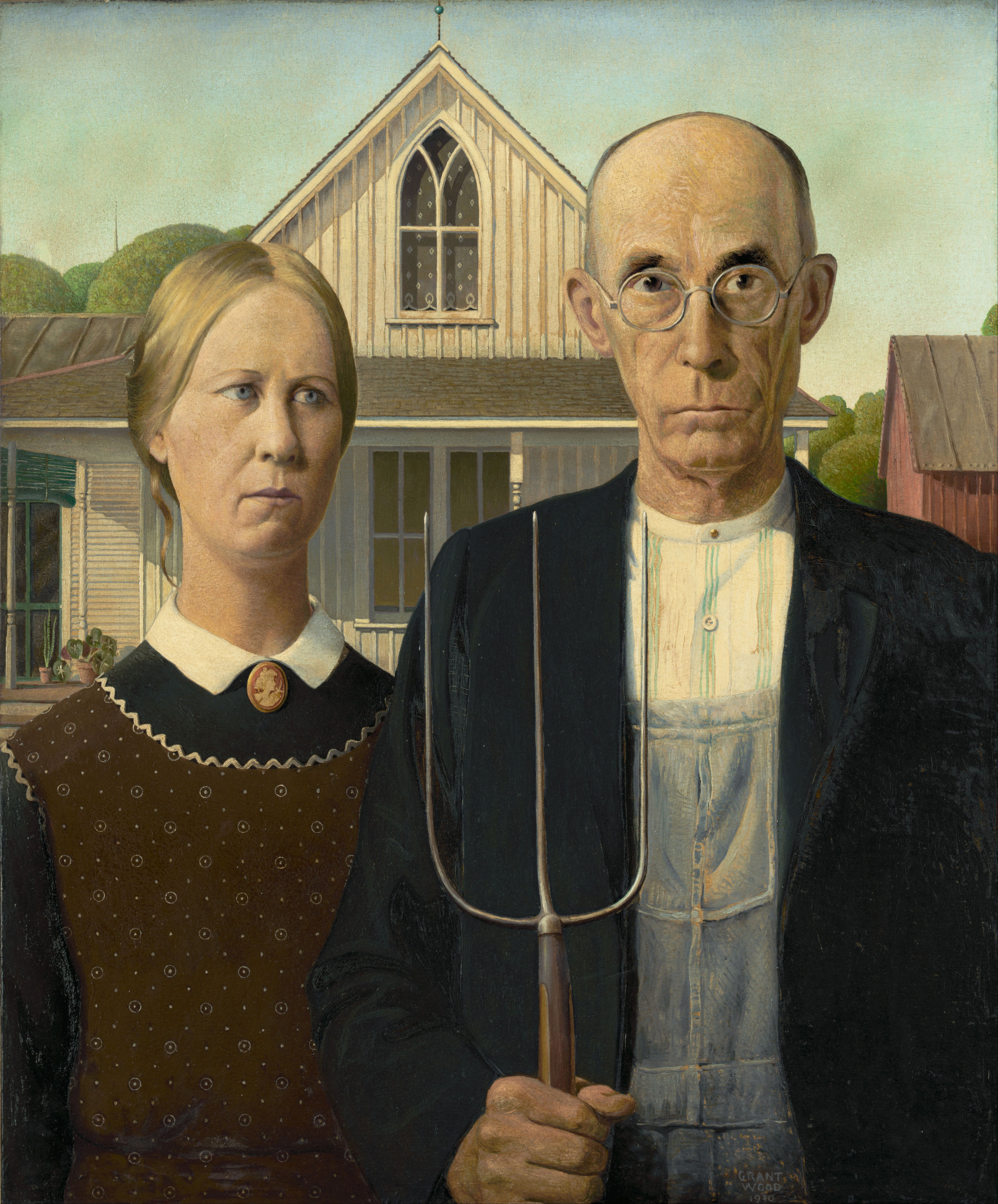
Grant Wood, 1930, social realism

American Gothic is a painting by Grant Wood from 1930. Portraying a pitchfork-holding farmer and a younger woman in front of a house of Carpenter Gothic style, it is one of the most familiar images in 20th-century American art. Art critics had favorable opinions about the painting, like Gertrude Stein and Christopher Morley, they assumed the painting was meant to be a satire of rural small-town life. It was thus seen as part of the trend towards increasingly critical depictions of rural America, along the lines of Sherwood Anderson's 1919 Winesburg, Ohio, Sinclair Lewis' 1920 Main Street, and Carl Van Vechten's The Tattooed Countess in literature. However, with the onset of the Great Depression, the painting came to be seen as a depiction of steadfast American pioneer spirit.

Diego Rivera is perhaps best known by the public world for his 1933 mural, "Man at the Crossroads", in the lobby of the RCA Building at Rockefeller Center. When his patron Nelson Rockefeller discovered that the mural included a portrait of Vladimir Lenin and other communist imagery, he fired Rivera, and the unfinished work was eventually destroyed by Rockefeller's staff. The film Cradle Will Rock includes a dramatization of the controversy. Frida Kahlo (Rivera's wife's) works are often characterized by their stark portrayals of pain. Of her 143 paintings 55 are self-portraits, which frequently incorporate symbolic portrayals of her physical and psychological wounds. Kahlo was deeply influenced by indigenous Mexican culture, which is apparent in her paintings' bright colors and dramatic symbolism. Christian and Jewish themes are often depicted in her work as well; she combined elements of the classic religious Mexican tradition—which were often bloody and violent—with surrealist renderings. While her paintings are not overtly Christian they certainly contain elements of the macabre Mexican Christian style of religious paintings.

Political activism was an important piece of David Siqueiros' life, and frequently inspired him to set aside his artistic career. His art was deeply rooted in the Mexican Revolution, a violent and chaotic period in Mexican history in which various social and political factions fought for recognition and power. The period from the 1920s to the 1950s is known as the Mexican Renaissance, and Siqueiros was active in the attempt to create an art that was at once Mexican and universal. He briefly gave up painting to focus on organizing miners in Jalisco.

==== World conflict ====
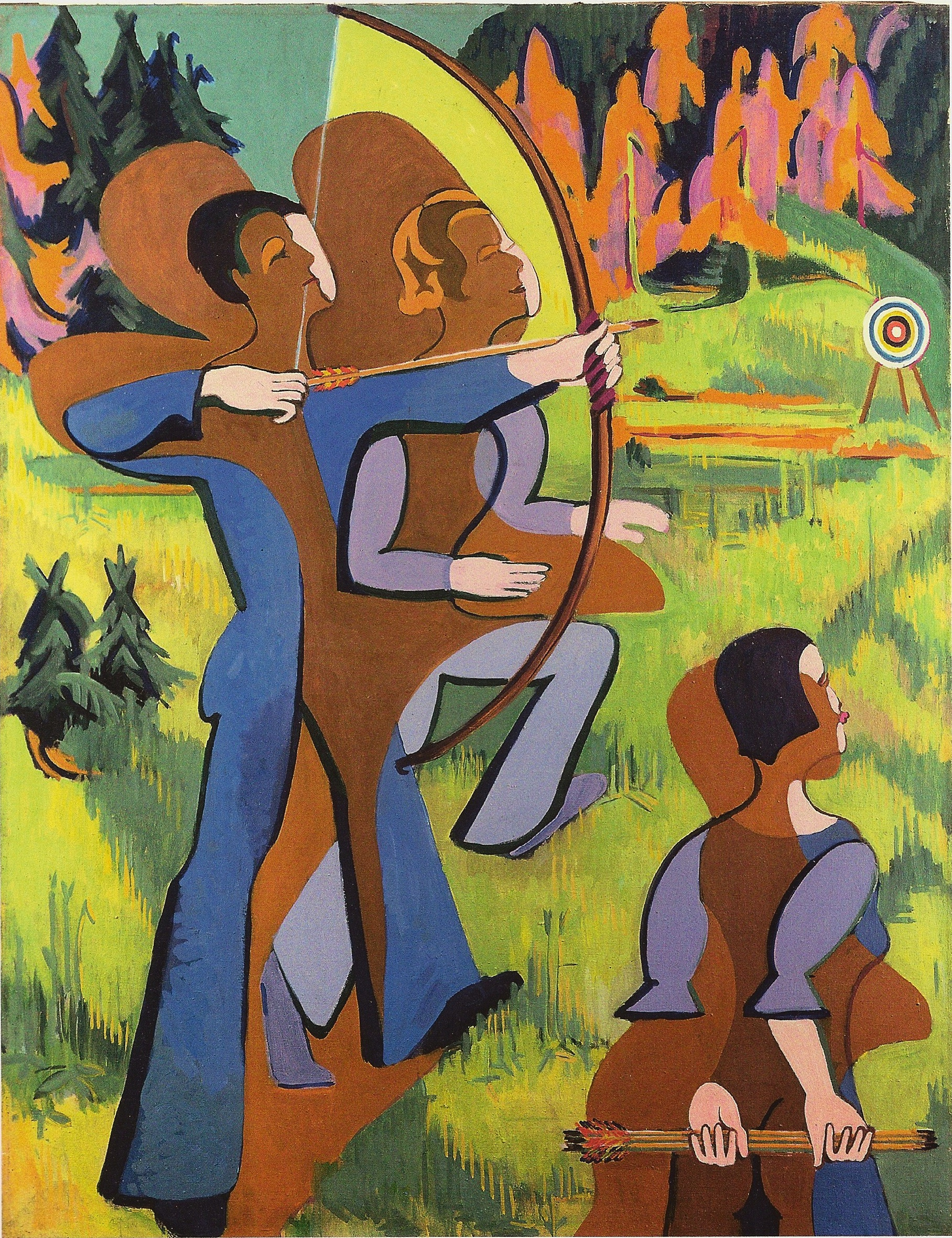
Ernst Ludwig Kirchner, 1935–1937, German Expressionism

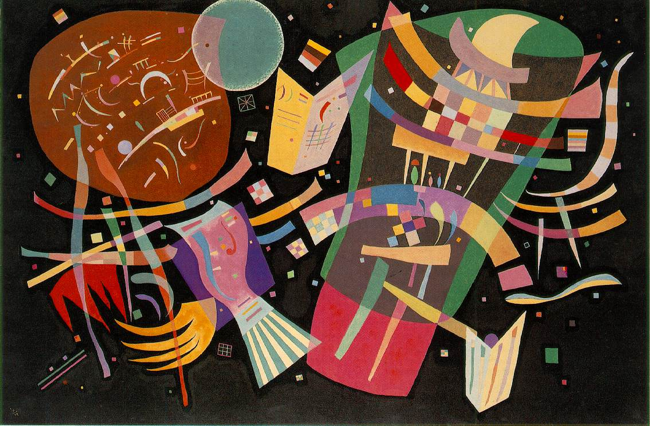
Wassily Kandinsky Composition X 1939, Geometric abstraction

During the 1930s radical leftist politics characterized many of the artists connected to Surrealism, including Pablo Picasso. On 26 April 1937, during the Spanish Civil War, the Basque town of Gernika was the scene of the "Bombing of Gernika" by the Condor Legion of Nazi Germany's Luftwaffe. The Germans were attacking to support the efforts of Francisco Franco to overthrow the Basque Government and the Spanish Republican government. The town was devastated, though the Biscayan assembly and the Oak of Gernika survived. Pablo Picasso painted his mural sized Guernica to commemorate the horrors of the bombing.

In its final form, Guernica is an immense black and white, 3.5 metres (11 feet) tall and 7.8 metres (26 feet) wide mural painted in oil. The mural presents a scene of death, violence, brutality, suffering, and helplessness without portraying their immediate causes. The choice to paint in black and white contrasts with the intensity of the scene depicted and invokes the immediacy of a newspaper photograph. Picasso painted the mural sized painting called Guernica in protest of the bombing. The painting was first exhibited in Paris in 1937, then Scandinavia, then London in 1938 and finally in 1939 at Picasso's request the painting was sent to the United States in an extended loan (for safekeeping) at MoMA. The painting went on a tour of museums throughout the USA until its final return to the Museum of Modern Art in New York City where it was exhibited for nearly thirty years. Finally in accord with Pablo Picasso's wish to give the painting to the people of Spain as a gift, it was sent to Spain in 1981.

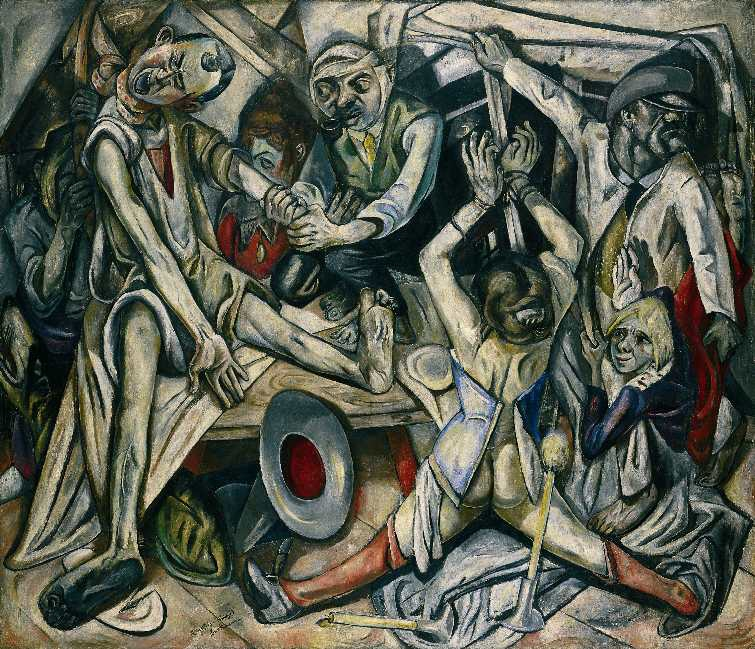
Max Beckmann, The Night (Die Nacht), 1918–1919, Kunstsammlung Nordrhein-Westfalen, Düsseldorf

During the Great Depression of the 1930s, through the years of World War II American art was characterized by Social Realism and American Scene Painting in the work of Grant Wood, Edward Hopper, Ben Shahn, Thomas Hart Benton, and several others. Nighthawks (1942) is a painting by Edward Hopper that portrays people sitting in a downtown diner late at night. It is not only Hopper's most famous painting, but one of the most recognizable in American art. It is currently in the collection of the Art Institute of Chicago. The scene was inspired by a diner (since demolished) in Greenwich Village, Hopper's home neighborhood in Manhattan. Hopper began painting it immediately after the attack on Pearl Harbor. After this event there was a large feeling of gloominess over the country, a feeling that is portrayed in the painting. The urban street is empty outside the diner, and inside none of the three patrons is apparently looking or talking to the others but instead is lost in their own thoughts. This portrayal of modern urban life as empty or lonely is a common theme throughout Hopper's work.

The Dynamic for artists in Europe during the 1930s deteriorated rapidly as the Nazi's power in Germany and across Eastern Europe increased. The climate became so hostile for artists and art associated with Modernism and abstraction that many left for the Americas. Degenerate art was a term adopted by the Nazi regime in Germany for virtually all modern art. Such art was banned on the grounds that it was un-German or Jewish Bolshevist in nature, and those identified as degenerate artists were subjected to sanctions. These included being dismissed from teaching positions, being forbidden to exhibit or to sell their art, and in some cases being forbidden to produce art entirely.

Degenerate Art was also the title of an exhibition, mounted by the Nazis in Munich in 1937, consisting of modernist artworks chaotically hung and accompanied by text labels deriding the art. Designed to inflame public opinion against modernism, the exhibition subsequently traveled to several other cities in Germany and Austria. German artist Max Beckmann and scores of others fled Europe for New York. In New York City a new generation of young and exciting Modernist painters led by Arshile Gorky, Willem de Kooning, and others were just beginning to come of age.

Arshile Gorky's portrait of someone who might be Willem de Kooning (above) is an example of the evolution of abstract expressionism from the context of figure painting, cubism and surrealism. Along with his friends de Kooning and John D. Graham Gorky created bio-morphically shaped and abstracted figurative compositions that by the 1940s evolved into totally abstract paintings. Gorky's work seems to be a careful analysis of memory, emotion and shape, using line and color to express feeling and nature.

==== Towards mid-century ====
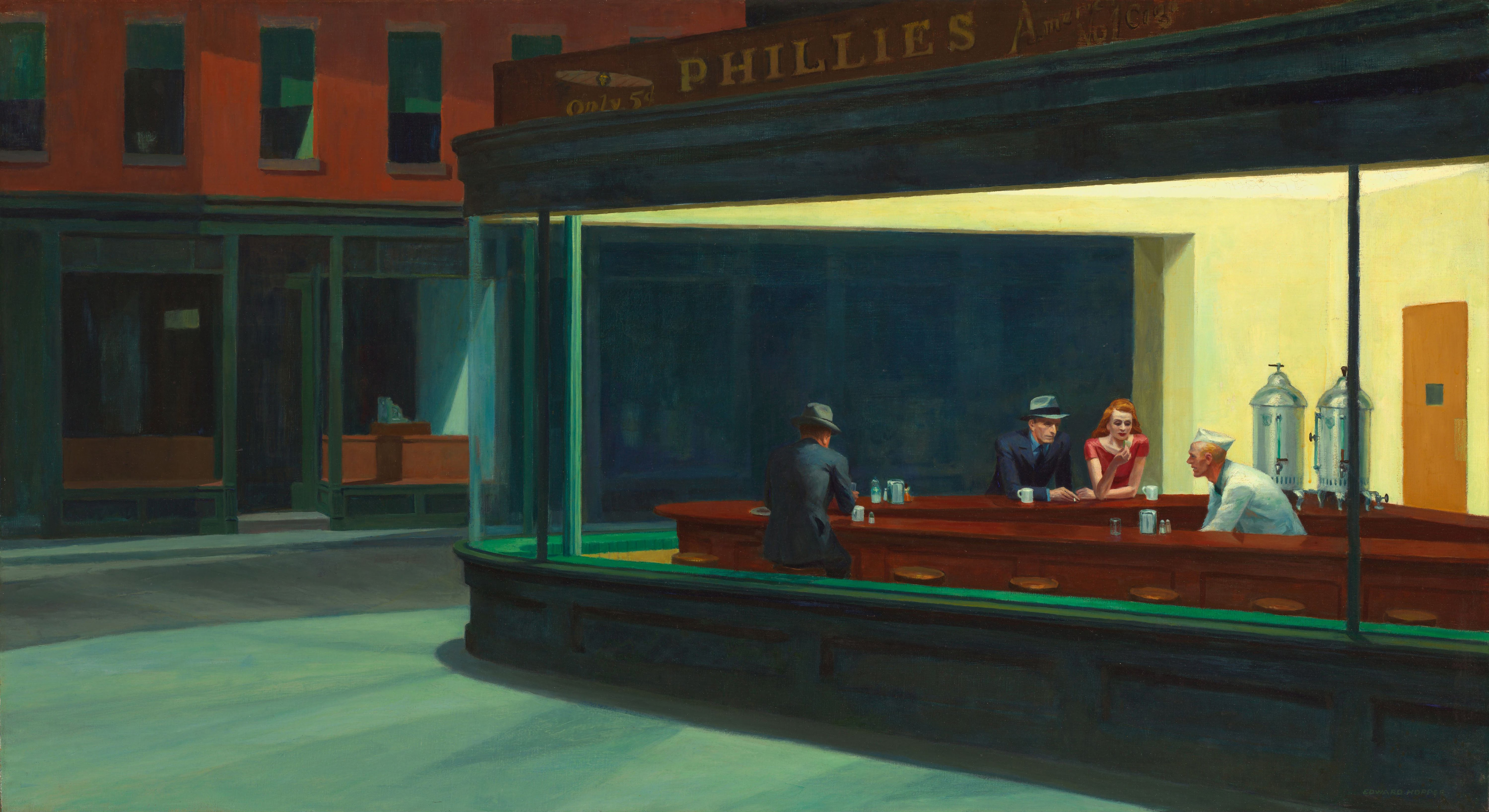
Edward Hopper, Nighthawks, 1942, an American Scene painting

The 1940s in New York City heralded the triumph of American abstract expressionism, a modernist movement that combined lessons learned from Henri Matisse, Pablo Picasso, Surrealism, Joan Miró, Cubism, Fauvism, and early Modernism via great teachers in America like Hans Hofmann and John D. Graham. American artists benefited from the presence of Piet Mondrian, Fernand Léger, Max Ernst and the André Breton group, Pierre Matisse's gallery, and Peggy Guggenheim's gallery The Art of This Century, as well as other factors. The figurative work of Francis Bacon, Frida Kahlo, Edward Hopper, Lucian Freud, Andrew Wyeth and others served as a kind of alternative to abstract expressionism.

Post-Second World War American painting called Abstract expressionism included artists like Jackson Pollock, Willem de Kooning, Arshile Gorky, Mark Rothko, Hans Hofmann, Clyfford Still, Franz Kline, Adolph Gottlieb, Mark Tobey, Barnett Newman, James Brooks, Philip Guston, Robert Motherwell, Conrad Marca-Relli, Jack Tworkov, William Baziotes, Richard Pousette-Dart, Ad Reinhardt, Hedda Sterne, Jimmy Ernst, Esteban Vicente, Bradley Walker Tomlin, and Theodoros Stamos, among others. American Abstract expressionism got its name in 1946 from the art critic Robert Coates. It is seen as combining the emotional intensity and self-denial of the German Expressionists with the anti-figurative aesthetic of the European abstract schools such as futurism, the Bauhaus and synthetic cubism. Abstract expressionism, action painting, and Color Field painting are synonymous with the New York School.

Technically Surrealism was an important predecessor for abstract expressionism with its emphasis on spontaneous, automatic or subconscious creation. Jackson Pollock's dripping paint onto a canvas laid on the floor is a technique that has its roots in the work of André Masson. Another important early manifestation of what came to be abstract expressionism is the work of American Northwest artist Mark Tobey, especially his "white writing" canvases, which, though generally not large in scale, anticipate the "all over" look of Pollock's drip paintings.

==== Abstract expressionism ====
Additionally, Abstract expressionism has an image of being rebellious, anarchic, highly idiosyncratic and, some feel, rather nihilistic. In practice, the term is applied to any number of artists working (mostly) in New York who had quite different styles, and even applied to work which is not especially abstract nor expressionist. Pollock's energetic "action paintings", with their "busy" feel, are different both technically and aesthetically, to the violent and grotesque Women series of Willem de Kooning. As seen above in the gallery Woman V is one of a series of six paintings made by de Kooning between 1950 and 1953 that depict a three-quarter-length female figure. He began the first of these paintings, Woman I collection: The Museum of Modern Art, New York City, in June 1950, repeatedly changing and painting out the image until January or February 1952, when the painting was abandoned unfinished. The art historian Meyer Schapiro saw the painting in de Kooning's studio soon afterwards and encouraged the artist to persist. De Kooning's response was to begin three other paintings on the same theme; Woman II collection: The Museum of Modern Art, New York City, Woman III, Tehran Museum of Contemporary Art, Woman IV, Nelson-Atkins Museum of Art, Kansas City, Missouri. During the summer of 1952, spent at East Hampton, de Kooning further explored the theme through drawings and pastels. He may have finished work on Woman I by the end of June, or possibly as late as November 1952, and probably the other three women pictures were concluded at much the same time. The Woman series are decidedly figurative paintings. Another important artist is Franz Kline, as demonstrated by his painting High Street, 1950 as with Jackson Pollock and other Abstract Expressionists, was labelled an "action painter" because of his seemingly spontaneous and intense style, focusing less, or not at all, on figures or imagery, but on the actual brush strokes and use of canvas.

Clyfford Still, Barnett Newman, Adolph Gottlieb, and the serenely shimmering blocks of color in Mark Rothko's work (which is not what would usually be called expressionist and which Rothko denied was abstract), are classified as abstract expressionists, albeit from what Clement Greenberg termed the Color Field direction of abstract expressionism. Both Hans Hofmann and Robert Motherwell (gallery) can be comfortably described as practitioners of action painting and Color Field painting.

Abstract expressionism has many stylistic similarities to the Russian artists of the early 20th century such as Wassily Kandinsky. Although it is true that spontaneity or of the impression of spontaneity characterized many of the abstract expressionists works, most of these paintings involved careful planning, especially since their large size demanded it. An exception might be the drip paintings of Pollock.

Why this style gained mainstream acceptance in the 1950s is a matter of debate. American Social realism had been the mainstream in the 1930s. It had been influenced not only by the Great Depression but also by the Social Realists of Mexico such as David Alfaro Siqueiros and Diego Rivera. The political climate after World War II did not long tolerate the social protests of those painters. Abstract expressionism arose during World War II and began to be showcased during the early 1940s at galleries in New York like The Art of This Century Gallery. The late 1940s through the mid-1950s ushered in the McCarthy era. It was after World War II and a time of political conservatism and extreme artistic censorship in the United States. Some people have conjectured that since the subject matter was often totally abstract, Abstract expressionism became a safe strategy for artists to pursue this style. Abstract art could be seen as apolitical. Or if the art was political, the message was largely for the insiders. However, those theorists are in the minority. As the first truly original school of painting in America, Abstract expressionism demonstrated the vitality and creativity of the country in the post-war years, as well as its ability (or need) to develop an aesthetic sense that was not constrained by the European standards of beauty.

Although Abstract expressionism spread quickly throughout the United States, the major centers of this style were New York City and California, especially in the New York School, and the San Francisco Bay area. Abstract expressionist paintings share certain characteristics, including the use of large canvases, an "all-over" approach, in which the whole canvas is treated with equal importance (as opposed to the center being of more interest than the edges). The canvas as the arena became a credo of action painting, while the integrity of the picture plane became a credo of the Color Field painters. Many other artists began exhibiting their abstract expressionist related paintings during the 1950s including Alfred Leslie, Sam Francis, Joan Mitchell, Helen Frankenthaler, Cy Twombly, Milton Resnick, Michael Goldberg, Norman Bluhm, Ray Parker, Nicolas Carone, Grace Hartigan, Friedel Dzubas, and Robert Goodnough among others.

During the 1950s Color Field painting initially referred to a particular type of abstract expressionism, especially the work of Mark Rothko, Clyfford Still, Barnett Newman, Robert Motherwell and Adolph Gottlieb. It essentially involved abstract paintings with large, flat expanses of color that expressed the sensual, and visual feelings and properties of large areas of nuanced surface. Art critic Clement Greenberg perceived Color Field painting as related to but different from Action painting. The overall expanse and gestalt of the work of the early color field painters speaks of an almost religious experience, awestruck in the face of an expanding universe of sensuality, color and surface. During the early-to-mid-1960s, Color Field painting came to refer to the styles of artists like Jules Olitski, Kenneth Noland, and Helen Frankenthaler, whose works were related to second-generation abstract expressionism, and to younger artists like Larry Zox, and Frank Stella, – all moving in a new direction. Artists like Clyfford Still, Mark Rothko, Hans Hofmann, Morris Louis, Jules Olitski, Kenneth Noland, Helen Frankenthaler, Larry Zox, and others often used greatly reduced references to nature, and they painted with a highly articulated and psychological use of color. In general these artists eliminated recognizable imagery. In Mountains and Sea, from 1952, a seminal work of Color Field painting by Helen Frankenthaler the artist used the stain technique for the first time.

In Europe there was the continuation of Surrealism, Cubism, Dada and the works of Matisse. Also in Europe, Tachisme (the European equivalent to Abstract expressionism) took hold of the newest generation. Serge Poliakoff, Nicolas de Staël, Georges Mathieu, Vieira da Silva, Jean Dubuffet, Yves Klein and Pierre Soulages among others are considered important figures in post-war European painting.

Eventually abstract painting in America evolved into movements such as Neo-Dada, Color Field painting, Post painterly abstraction, Op art, hard-edge painting, Minimal art, shaped canvas painting, lyrical abstraction, Neo-expressionism and the continuation of Abstract expressionism. As a response to the tendency toward abstraction imagery emerged through various new movements, notably Pop art.

==== Pop art ====
Earlier in England in 1956 the term Pop Art was used by Lawrence Alloway for paintings that celebrated consumerism of the post World War II era. This movement rejected abstract expressionism and its focus on the hermeneutic and psychological interior, in favor of art which depicted, and often celebrated material consumer culture, advertising, and iconography of the mass production age. The early works of David Hockney and the works of Richard Hamilton Peter Blake and Eduardo Paolozzi were considered seminal examples in the movement.

Pop art in America was to a large degree initially inspired by the works of Jasper Johns, Larry Rivers, and Robert Rauschenberg. Although the paintings of Gerald Murphy, Stuart Davis and Charles Demuth during the 1920s and 1930s set the table for pop art in America. In New York City during the mid-1950s Robert Rauschenberg and Jasper Johns created works of art that at first seemed to be continuations of Abstract expressionist painting. Actually their works and the work of Larry Rivers, were radical departures from abstract expressionism especially in the use of banal and literal imagery and the inclusion and the combining of mundane materials into their work. The innovations of Johns' specific use of various images and objects like chairs, numbers, targets, beer cans and the American flag; Rivers paintings of subjects drawn from popular culture such as George Washington crossing the Delaware, and his inclusions of images from advertisements like the camel from Camel cigarettes, and Rauschenberg's surprising constructions using inclusions of objects and pictures taken from popular culture, hardware stores, junkyards, the city streets, and taxidermy gave rise to a radical new movement in American art. Eventually by 1963 the movement came to be known worldwide as pop art.

American pop art is exemplified by artists: Andy Warhol, Claes Oldenburg, Wayne Thiebaud, James Rosenquist, Jim Dine, Tom Wesselmann and Roy Lichtenstein among others. Lichtenstein's most important work is arguably Whaam! (1963, Tate Modern, London), one of the earliest known examples of pop art, adapted a comic-book panel from a 1962 issue of DC Comics' All-American Men of War. The painting depicts a fighter aircraft firing a rocket into an enemy plane, with a red-and-yellow explosion. The cartoon style is heightened by the use of the onomatopoeic lettering "Whaam!" and the boxed caption "I pressed the fire control... and ahead of me rockets blazed through the sky..." Pop art merges popular and mass culture with fine art, while injecting humor, irony, and recognizable imagery and content into the mix. In October 1962 the Sidney Janis Gallery mounted The New Realists the first major pop art group exhibition in an uptown art gallery in New York City. Sidney Janis mounted the exhibition in a 57th Street storefront near his gallery at 15 E. 57th Street. The show sent shockwaves through the New York School and reverberated worldwide. Earlier in the fall of 1962 an historically important and ground-breaking New Painting of Common Objects exhibition of pop art, curated by Walter Hopps at the Pasadena Art Museum sent shock waves across the Western United States.

While in the downtown scene in New York City's East Village 10th Street galleries artists were formulating an American version of Pop Art. Claes Oldenburg had his storefront and made painted objects, and the Green Gallery on 57th Street began to show Tom Wesselmann and James Rosenquist. Later Leo Castelli exhibited other American artists including the bulk of the careers of Andy Warhol and Roy Lichtenstein and his use of Benday dots, a technique used in commercial reproduction. There is a connection between the radical works of Duchamp, and Man Ray, the rebellious Dadaists – with a sense of humor; and pop artists like Alex Katz (who became known for his parodies of portrait photography and suburban life), Claes Oldenburg, Andy Warhol, Roy Lichtenstein and the others.

While throughout the 20th century many painters continued to practice landscape and figurative painting with contemporary subjects and solid technique, like Milton Avery, John D. Graham, Fairfield Porter, Edward Hopper, Balthus, Francis Bacon, Nicolas de Staël, Andrew Wyeth, Lucian Freud, Frank Auerbach, Philip Pearlstein, David Park, Nathan Oliveira, David Hockney, Malcolm Morley, Richard Estes, Ralph Goings, Audrey Flack, Chuck Close, Susan Rothenberg, Eric Fischl, Vija Celmins and Richard Diebenkorn.

==== Figurative, landscape, still-Life, seascape, and Realism ====
During the 1930s through the 1960s abstract painting in America and Europe evolved into movements such as abstract expressionism, Color Field painting, Post painterly abstraction, Op art, hard-edge painting, Minimal art, shaped canvas painting, and lyrical abstraction. Other artists reacted as a response to the tendency toward abstraction, allowing figurative imagery to continue through various new contexts like the Bay Area Figurative Movement in the 1950s and new forms of expressionism from the 1940s through the 1960s. In Italy during this time, Giorgio Morandi was the foremost still life painter, exploring a wide variety of approaches to depicting everyday bottles and kitchen implements. Throughout the 20th century many painters practiced Realism and used expressive imagery; practicing landscape and figurative painting with contemporary subjects and solid technique, and unique expressivity like still-life painter Giorgio Morandi, Milton Avery, John D. Graham, Fairfield Porter, Edward Hopper, Andrew Wyeth, Balthus, Francis Bacon, Leon Kossoff, Frank Auerbach, Lucian Freud, Philip Pearlstein, Willem de Kooning, Arshile Gorky, Grace Hartigan, Robert De Niro, Sr., Elaine de Kooning and others. Along with Henri Matisse, Pablo Picasso, Pierre Bonnard, Georges Braque, and other 20th-century masters. In particular Milton Avery through his use of color and his interest in seascape and landscape paintings connected with the Color field aspect of Abstract expressionism as manifested by Adolph Gottlieb and Mark Rothko as well as the lessons American painters took from the work of Henri Matisse.

Head VI, 1949 is a painting by the Irish born artist Francis Bacon and is an example of Post World War II European Expressionism. The work shows a distorted version of the Portrait of Innocent X painted by the Spanish artist Diego Velázquez in 1650. The work is one of a series of variants of the Velázquez painting which Bacon executed throughout the 1950s and early 1960s, over a total of forty-five works. When asked why he was compelled to revisit the subject so often, Bacon replied that he had nothing against the Popes, that he merely "wanted an excuse to use these colours, and you can't give ordinary clothes that purple colour without getting into a sort of false fauve manner." The Pope in this version seethes with anger and aggression, and the dark colors give the image a grotesque and nightmarish appearance. The pleated curtains of the backdrop are rendered transparent, and seem to fall through the Pope's face. Italian painter Giorgio Morandi was an important 20th-century early pioneer of Minimalism. Born in Bologna, Italy, in 1890, throughout his career, Morandi concentrated almost exclusively on still lifes and landscapes, except for a few self-portraits. With great sensitivity to tone, color, and compositional balance, he would depict the same familiar bottles and vases again and again in paintings notable for their simplicity of execution. Morandi executed 133 etchings, a significant body of work in its own right, and his drawings and watercolors often approach abstraction in their economy of means. Through his simple and repetitive motifs and economical use of color, value and surface, Morandi became a prescient and important forerunner of Minimalism. He died in Bologna in 1964.

After World War II the term School of Paris often referred to Tachisme, the European equivalent of American Abstract expressionism and those artists are also related to Cobra. Important proponents being Jean Dubuffet, Pierre Soulages, Nicolas de Staël, Hans Hartung, Serge Poliakoff, and Georges Mathieu, among several others. During the early 1950s Dubuffet (who was always a figurative artist), and de Staël, abandoned abstraction, and returned to imagery via figuration and landscape. De Staël 's work was quickly recognised within the post-war art world, and he became one of the most influential artists of the 1950s. His return to representation (seascapes, footballers, jazz musicians, seagulls) during the early 1950s can be seen as an influential precedent for the American Bay Area Figurative Movement, as many of those abstract painters like Richard Diebenkorn, David Park, Elmer Bischoff, Wayne Thiebaud, Nathan Oliveira, Joan Brown and others made a similar move; returning to imagery during the mid-1950s. Much of de Staël 's late work – in particular his thinned, and diluted oil on canvas abstract landscapes of the mid-1950s predicts Color Field painting and Lyrical Abstraction of the 1960s and 1970s. Nicolas de Staël's bold and intensely vivid color in his last paintings predict the direction of much of contemporary painting that came after him including Pop art of the 1960s.

==== Art brut, New Realism, Bay Area Figurative Movement, neo-Dada, photorealism ====
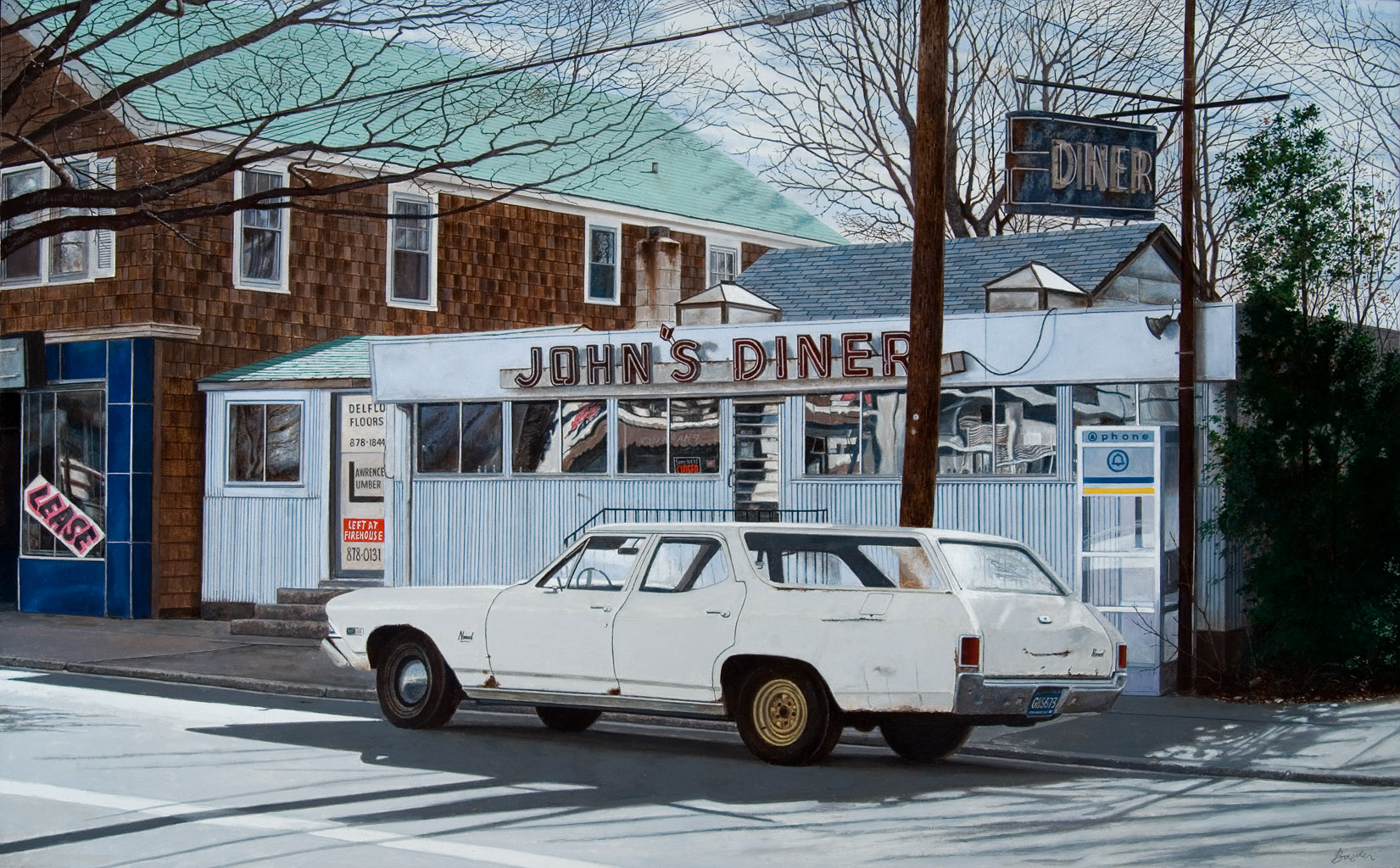
John Baeder, Photorealism

During the 1950s and 1960s as abstract painting in America and Europe evolved into movements such as Color Field painting, post-painterly abstraction, op art, hard-edge painting, minimal art, shaped canvas painting, lyrical abstraction, and the continuation of Abstract expressionism. Other artists reacted as a response to the tendency toward abstraction with art brut, as seen in Court les rues, 1962, by Jean Dubuffet, fluxus, neo-Dada, New Realism, allowing imagery to re-emerge through various new contexts like pop art, the Bay Area Figurative Movement (a prime example is Diebenkorn's Cityscape I, (Landscape No. 1), 1963, Oil on canvas, 60 1/4 x 50 1/2 inches, collection: San Francisco Museum of Modern Art) and later in the 1970s Neo-expressionism. The Bay Area Figurative Movement of whom David Park, Elmer Bischoff, Nathan Oliveira and Richard Diebenkorn whose painting Cityscape 1, 1963 is a typical example were influential members flourished during the 1950s and 1960s in California. Although throughout the 20th century painters continued to practice Realism and use imagery, practicing landscape and figurative painting with contemporary subjects and solid technique, and unique expressivity like Milton Avery, Edward Hopper, Jean Dubuffet, Francis Bacon, Frank Auerbach, Lucian Freud, Philip Pearlstein, and others. Younger painters practiced the use of imagery in new and radical ways. Yves Klein, Martial Raysse, Niki de Saint Phalle, Wolf Vostell, David Hockney, Alex Katz, Malcolm Morley, Ralph Goings, Audrey Flack, Richard Estes, Chuck Close, Susan Rothenberg, Eric Fischl, John Baeder and Vija Celmins were a few who became prominent between the 1960s and the 1980s. Fairfield Porter was largely self-taught, and produced representational work in the midst of the Abstract Expressionist movement. His subjects were primarily landscapes, domestic interiors and portraits of family, friends and fellow artists, many of them affiliated with the New York School of writers, including John Ashbery, Frank O'Hara, and James Schuyler. Many of his paintings were set in or around the family summer house on Great Spruce Head Island, Maine.

Also during the 1960s and 1970s, there was a reaction against painting. Critics like Douglas Crimp viewed the work of artists like Ad Reinhardt, and declared the "death of painting". Artists began to practice new ways of making art. New movements gained prominence some of which are: Fluxus, Happening, Video art, Installation art Mail art, the situationists, Conceptual art, Postminimalism, Earth art, arte povera, performance art and body art among others.

Neo-Dada is also a movement that started in the 1950s and 1960s and was related to Abstract expressionism only with imagery. Featuring the emergence of combined manufactured items, with artist materials, moving away from previous conventions of painting. This trend in art is exemplified by the work of Jasper Johns and Robert Rauschenberg, whose "combines" in the 1950s were forerunners of Pop Art and Installation art, and made use of the assemblage of large physical objects, including stuffed animals, birds and commercial photography. Robert Rauschenberg, Jasper Johns, Larry Rivers, John Chamberlain, Claes Oldenburg, George Segal, Jim Dine, and Edward Kienholz among others were important pioneers of both abstraction and Pop Art; creating new conventions of art-making; they made acceptable in serious contemporary art circles the radical inclusion of unlikely materials as parts of their works of art.

==== New abstraction from the 1950s through the 1980s ====
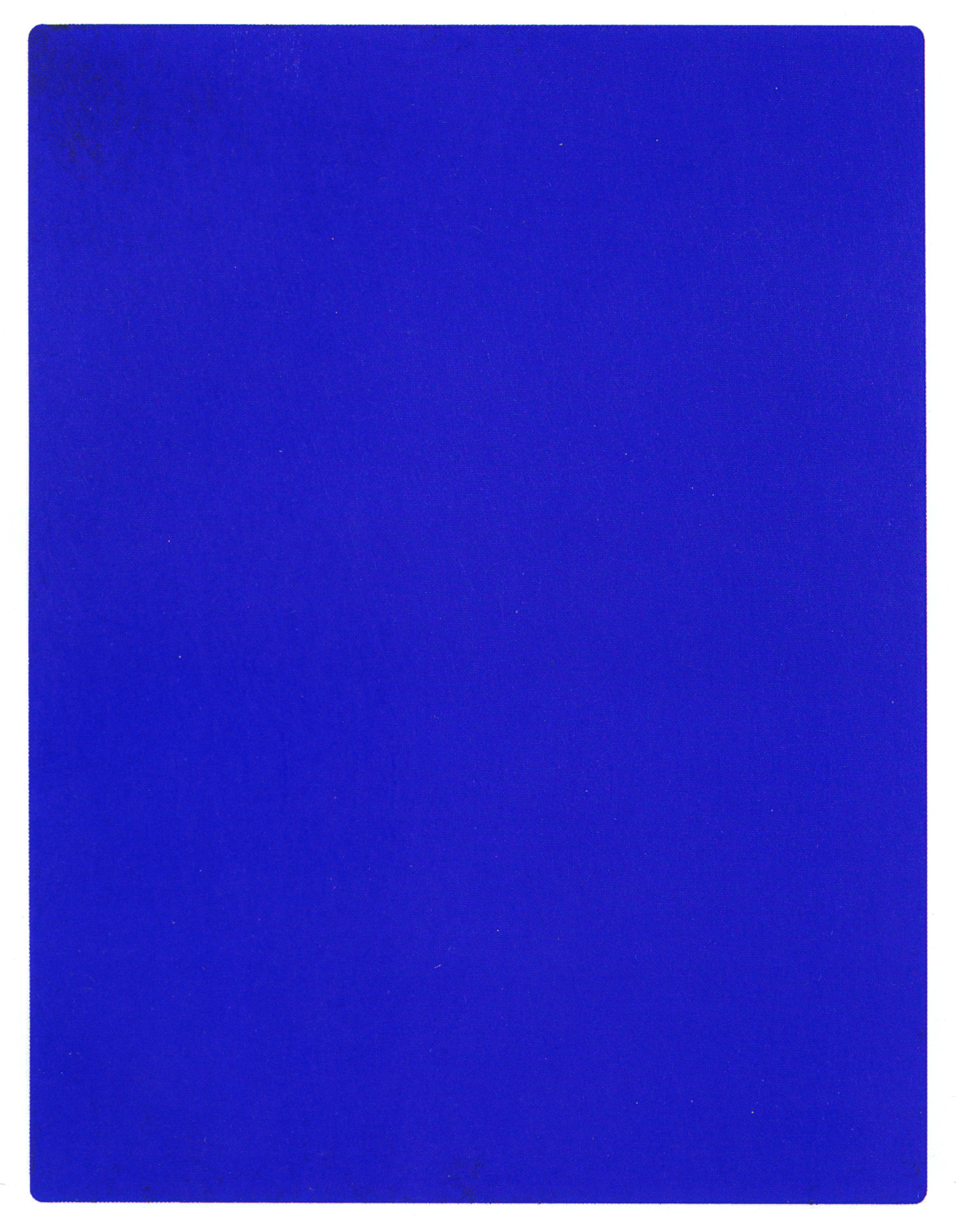
Yves Klein, 1962, monochrome painting

Color Field painting clearly pointed toward a new direction in American painting, away from abstract expressionism. Color Field painting is related to post-painterly abstraction, suprematism, abstract expressionism, hard-edge painting and Lyrical Abstraction. During the 1960s and 1970s abstract painting continued to develop in America through varied styles. Geometric abstraction, Op art, hard-edge painting, Color Field painting and minimal painting, were some interrelated directions for advanced abstract painting as well as some other new movements. Morris Louis was an important pioneer in advanced Color Field painting, his work can serve as a bridge between abstract expressionism, Color Field painting, and minimal art. Two influential teachers Josef Albers and Hans Hofmann introduced a new generation of American artists to their advanced theories of color and space. Josef Albers is best remembered for his work as a Geometric abstractionist painter and theorist. Most famous of all are the hundreds of paintings and prints that make up the series Homage to the Square. In this rigorous series, begun in 1949, Albers explored chromatic interactions with flat colored squares arranged concentrically on the canvas. Albers' theories on art and education were formative for the next generation of artists. His own paintings form the foundation of both hard-edge painting and Op art.

Josef Albers, Hans Hofmann, Ilya Bolotowsky, Burgoyne Diller, Victor Vasarely, Bridget Riley, Richard Anuszkiewicz, Frank Stella, Morris Louis, Kenneth Noland, Ellsworth Kelly, Barnett Newman, Larry Poons, Ronald Davis, Larry Zox, Al Held and some others like Mino Argento, are artists closely associated with Geometric abstraction, Op art, Color Field painting, and in the case of Hofmann and Newman Abstract expressionism as well.

In 1965, an exhibition called The Responsive Eye, curated by William C. Seitz, was held at the Museum of Modern Art, in New York City. The works shown were wide-ranging, encompassing the Minimalism of Frank Stella, the Op art of Larry Poons, the work of Alexander Liberman, alongside the masters of the Op Art movement: Victor Vasarely, Richard Anuszkiewicz, Bridget Riley and others. The exhibition focused on the perceptual aspects of art, which result both from the illusion of movement and the interaction of color relationships. Op art, also known as optical art, is a style present in some paintings and other works of art that use optical illusions. Op art is also closely akin to geometric abstraction and hard-edge painting. Although sometimes the term used for it is perceptual abstraction.

Op art is a method of painting concerning the interaction between illusion and picture plane, between understanding and seeing. Op art works are abstract, with many of the better known pieces made in only black and white. When the viewer looks at them, the impression is given of movement, hidden images, flashing and vibration, patterns, or alternatively, of swelling or warping.

Color Field painting sought to rid art of superfluous rhetoric. Artists like Clyfford Still, Mark Rothko, Hans Hofmann, Morris Louis, Jules Olitski, Kenneth Noland, Helen Frankenthaler, John Hoyland, Larry Zox, and others often used greatly reduced references to nature, and they painted with a highly articulated and psychological use of color. In general these artists eliminated recognizable imagery. Certain artists quoted references to past or present art, but in general color field painting presents abstraction as an end in itself. In pursuing this direction of modern art, artists wanted to present each painting as one unified, cohesive, monolithic image.

==== Washington Color School, Shaped canvas, Abstract illusionism, Lyrical abstraction ====
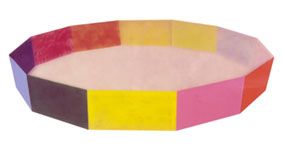
Ronald Davis 1968, Abstract Illusionism

The Washington Color School, was an art movement starting during the 1950s–1970s in Washington, D.C., in the United States, built of abstract expressionist artists. The movement emerged during a time when society, the arts, and people were changing quickly. The founders of this movement are Morris Louis and Kenneth Noland, however four more artists were part of the initial art exhibition in 1965.

Frank Stella, Kenneth Noland, Ellsworth Kelly, Barnett Newman, Ronald Davis, Neil Williams, Robert Mangold, Charles Hinman, Richard Tuttle, David Novros, and Alvin Loving are examples of artists associated with the use of the shaped canvas during the period beginning in the early 1960s. Many Geometric abstract artists, minimalists, and Hard-edge painters elected to use the edges of the image to define the shape of the painting rather than accepting the rectangular format. In fact, the use of the shaped canvas is primarily associated with paintings of the 1960s and 1970s that are coolly abstract, formalistic, geometrical, objective, rationalistic, clean-lined, brashly sharp-edged, or minimalist in character. The Andre Emmerich Gallery, the Leo Castelli Gallery, the Richard Feigen Gallery, and the Park Place Gallery were important showcases for Color Field painting, shaped canvas painting and Lyrical Abstraction in New York City during the 1960s. There is a connection with post-painterly abstraction, which reacted against abstract expressionisms' mysticism, hyper-subjectivity, and emphasis on making the act of painting itself dramatically visible – as well as the solemn acceptance of the flat rectangle as an almost ritual prerequisite for serious painting. During the 1960s Color Field painting and Minimal art were often closely associated with each other. In actuality by the early 1970s both movements became decidedly diverse.

Another related movement of the late 1960s, Lyrical Abstraction (the term being coined by Larry Aldrich, the founder of the Aldrich Contemporary Art Museum, Ridgefield Connecticut), encompassed what Aldrich said he saw in the studios of many artists at that time. It is also the name of an exhibition that originated in the Aldrich Museum and traveled to the Whitney Museum of American Art and other museums throughout the United States between 1969 and 1971.

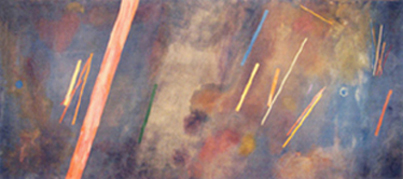
Ronnie Landfield, 1968, Lyrical Abstraction

Lyrical Abstraction in the late 1960s is characterized by the paintings of Dan Christensen, Ronnie Landfield, Peter Young and others, and along with the fluxus movement and postminimalism (a term first coined by Robert Pincus-Witten in the pages of Artforum in 1969) sought to expand the boundaries of abstract painting and minimalism by focusing on process, new materials and new ways of expression. Postminimalism often incorporating industrial materials, raw materials, fabrications, found objects, installation, serial repetition, and often with references to Dada and Surrealism is best exemplified in the sculptures of Eva Hesse. Lyrical Abstraction, conceptual art, postminimalism, Earth art, video, performance art, installation art, along with the continuation of fluxus, abstract expressionism, Color Field painting, hard-edge painting, minimal art, op art, pop art, photorealism and New Realism extended the boundaries of contemporary art in the mid-1960s through the 1970s. Lyrical Abstraction is a type of freewheeling abstract painting that emerged in the mid-1960s when abstract painters returned to various forms of painterly, pictorial, expressionism with a predominate focus on process, gestalt and repetitive compositional strategies in general.

Lyrical Abstraction shares similarities with color field painting and abstract expressionism, Lyrical Abstraction as exemplified by the 1968 Ronnie Landfield painting For William Blake, (above) especially in the freewheeling usage of paint – texture and surface. Direct drawing, calligraphic use of line, the effects of brushed, splattered, stained, squeegeed, poured, and splashed paint superficially resemble the effects seen in abstract expressionism and color field painting. However, the styles are markedly different. Setting it apart from abstract expressionism and action painting of the 1940s and 1950s is the approach to composition and drama. As seen in action painting there is an emphasis on brushstrokes, high compositional drama, dynamic compositional tension. While in Lyrical Abstraction there is a sense of compositional randomness, all over composition, low key and relaxed compositional drama and an emphasis on process, repetition, and an all over sensibility.

==== Hard-edge painting, minimalism, postminimalism, monochrome painting ====
Brice Marden, 1966/1986, Monochrome painting

Agnes Martin, Robert Mangold, Brice Marden, Jo Baer, Robert Ryman, Richard Tuttle, Neil Williams, David Novros, Paul Mogenson, Charles Hinman are examples of artists associated with Minimalism and (exceptions of Martin, Baer and Marden) the use of the shaped canvas also during the period beginning in the early 1960s. Many Geometric abstract artists, minimalists, and hard-edge painters elected to use the edges of the image to define the shape of the painting rather than accepting the rectangular format. In fact, the use of the shaped canvas is primarily associated with paintings of the 1960s and 1970s that are coolly abstract, formalistic, geometrical, objective, rationalistic, clean-lined, brashly sharp-edged, or minimalist in character. The Bykert Gallery, and the Park Place Gallery were important showcases for Minimalism and shaped canvas painting in New York City during the 1960s.

During the 1960s and 1970s artists such as Robert Motherwell, Adolph Gottlieb, Phillip Guston, Lee Krasner, Cy Twombly, Robert Rauschenberg, Jasper Johns, Richard Diebenkorn, Josef Albers, Elmer Bischoff, Agnes Martin, Al Held, Sam Francis, Ellsworth Kelly, Morris Louis, Helen Frankenthaler, Gene Davis, Frank Stella, Kenneth Noland, Joan Mitchell, Friedel Dzubas, and younger artists like Brice Marden, Robert Mangold, Sam Gilliam, John Hoyland, Sean Scully, Pat Steir, Elizabeth Murray, Larry Poons, Walter Darby Bannard, Larry Zox, Ronnie Landfield, Ronald Davis, Dan Christensen, Joan Snyder, Ross Bleckner, Archie Rand, Susan Crile, and dozens of others produced a wide variety of paintings.

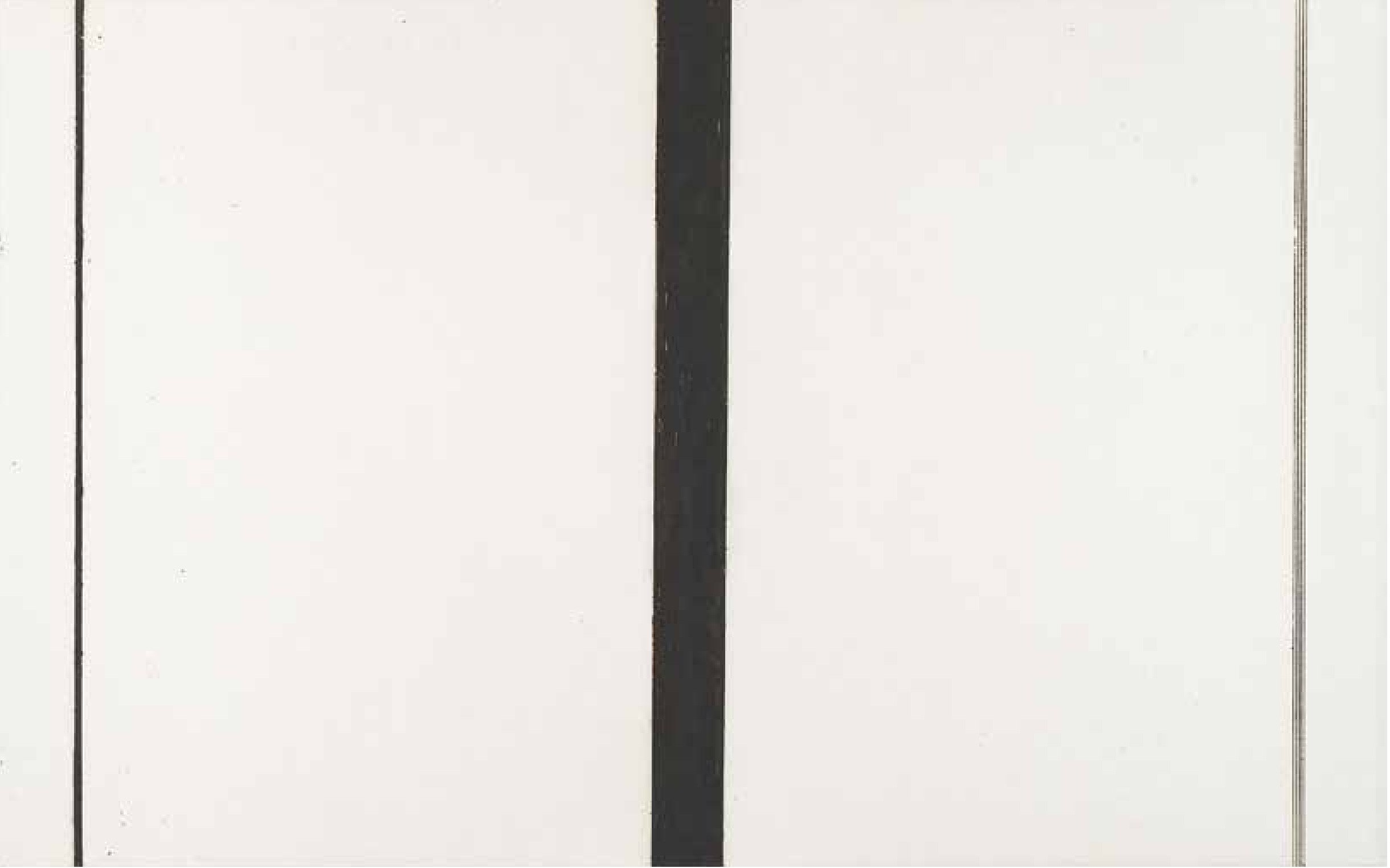
Barnett Newman, Untitled Etching 1 (First Version), 1968, Minimalism

During the 1960s and 1970s, there was a reaction against abstract painting. Some critics viewed the work of artists like Ad Reinhardt, and declared the 'death of painting'. Artists began to practice new ways of making art. New movements gained prominence some of which are: postminimalism, Earth art, video art, installation art, arte povera, performance art, body art, fluxus, happening, mail art, the situationists and conceptual art among others.

However still other important innovations in abstract painting took place during the 1960s and the 1970s characterized by monochrome painting and hard-edge painting inspired by Ad Reinhardt, Barnett Newman, Milton Resnick, and Ellsworth Kelly. Ranging from geometric abstraction in a variety of mediums to non-representational gestural painting, monochromatic works continue to be an important influence in contemporary art. Ranging from geometric abstraction in a variety of mediums to non-representational gestural painting, monochromatic works continue to be an important influence in contemporary art. Artists as diverse as Agnes Martin, Al Held, Larry Zox, Frank Stella, Larry Poons, Brice Marden and others explored the power of simplification. The convergence of Color Field painting, minimal art, hard-edge painting, Lyrical Abstraction, and postminimalism blurred the distinction between movements that became more apparent in the 1980s and 1990s. The neo-expressionism movement is related to earlier developments in abstract expressionism, neo-Dada, Lyrical Abstraction and postminimal painting.

==== Neo Expressionism ====
In the late 1960s an abstract expressionist painter Philip Guston helped to lead a transition from abstract expressionism to Neo-expressionism in painting, abandoning the so-called "pure abstraction" of abstract expressionism in favor of more cartoonish renderings of various personal symbols and objects. These works were inspirational to a new generation of painters interested in a revival of expressive imagery. His painting Painting, Smoking, Eating 1973, seen above in the gallery is an example of Guston's final and conclusive return to representation.

In the late 1970s and early 1980s, there was also a return to painting that occurred almost simultaneously in Italy, Germany, France and Britain. These movements were called Transavantguardia, Neue Wilde, Figuration Libre, Neo-expressionism, the school of London, and in the late 1980s the Stuckists respectively. These paintings were characterized by large formats, free expressive mark making, figuration, myth and imagination. All work in this genre came to be labeled neo-expressionism. Critical reaction was divided. Some critics regarded it as driven by profit motivations by large commercial galleries. This type of art continues in popularity into the 21st century, even after the art crash of the late 1980s. Anselm Kiefer is a leading figure in European Neo-expressionism by the 1980s, Kiefer's themes widened from a focus on Germany's role in civilization to the fate of art and culture in general. His work became more sculptural and involves not only national identity and collective memory, but also occult symbolism, theology and mysticism. The theme of all the work is the trauma experienced by entire societies, and the continual rebirth and renewal in life.

During the late 1970s in the United States painters who began working with invigorated surfaces and who returned to imagery like Susan Rothenberg gained in popularity, especially as seen above in paintings like Horse 2, 1979. During the 1980s American artists like Eric Fischl, David Salle, Jean-Michel Basquiat (who began as a graffiti artist), Julian Schnabel, and Keith Haring, and Italian painters like Mimmo Paladino, Sandro Chia, and Enzo Cucchi, among others defined the idea of Neo-expressionism in America.

Neo-expressionism was a style of modern painting that became popular in the late 1970s and dominated the art market until the mid-1980s. It developed in Europe as a reaction against the conceptual and minimalistic art of the 1960s and 1970s. Neo-expressionists returned to portraying recognizable objects, such as the human body (although sometimes in a virtually abstract manner), in a rough and violently emotional way using vivid colours and banal colour harmonies. The veteran painters Philip Guston, Frank Auerbach, Leon Kossoff, Gerhard Richter, A. R. Penck and Georg Baselitz, along with slightly younger artists like Anselm Kiefer, Eric Fischl, Susan Rothenberg, Francesco Clemente, Jean-Michel Basquiat, Julian Schnabel, Keith Haring, and many others became known for working in this intense expressionist vein of painting.

Painting still holds a respected position in contemporary art. Art is an open field no longer divided by the objective versus non-objective dichotomy. Artists can achieve critical success whether their images are representational or abstract. What has currency is content, exploring the boundaries of the medium, and a refusal to recapitulate the works of the past as an end goal.

==== Contemporary painting into the 21st century ====
At the beginning of the 21st century, Contemporary painting and Contemporary art in general continue in several contiguous modes, characterized by the idea of pluralism. The "crisis" in painting and current art and current art criticism today is brought about by pluralism. There is no consensus as to a representative style of the age. Consequently important works of art continue to be made albeit in a wide variety of styles and aesthetic temperaments, the marketplace being left to judge merit.

Hard-edge painting, geometric abstraction, appropriation, hyperrealism, photorealism, expressionism, minimalism, Lyrical Abstraction, pop art, op art, abstract expressionism, Color Field painting, monochrome painting, neo-expressionism, collage, intermedia painting, assemblage painting, digital painting, postmodern painting, neo-Dada painting, shaped canvas painting, environmental mural painting, traditional figure painting, landscape painting, portrait painting, are a few continuing and current directions in painting at the beginning of the 21st century.

== Americas ==
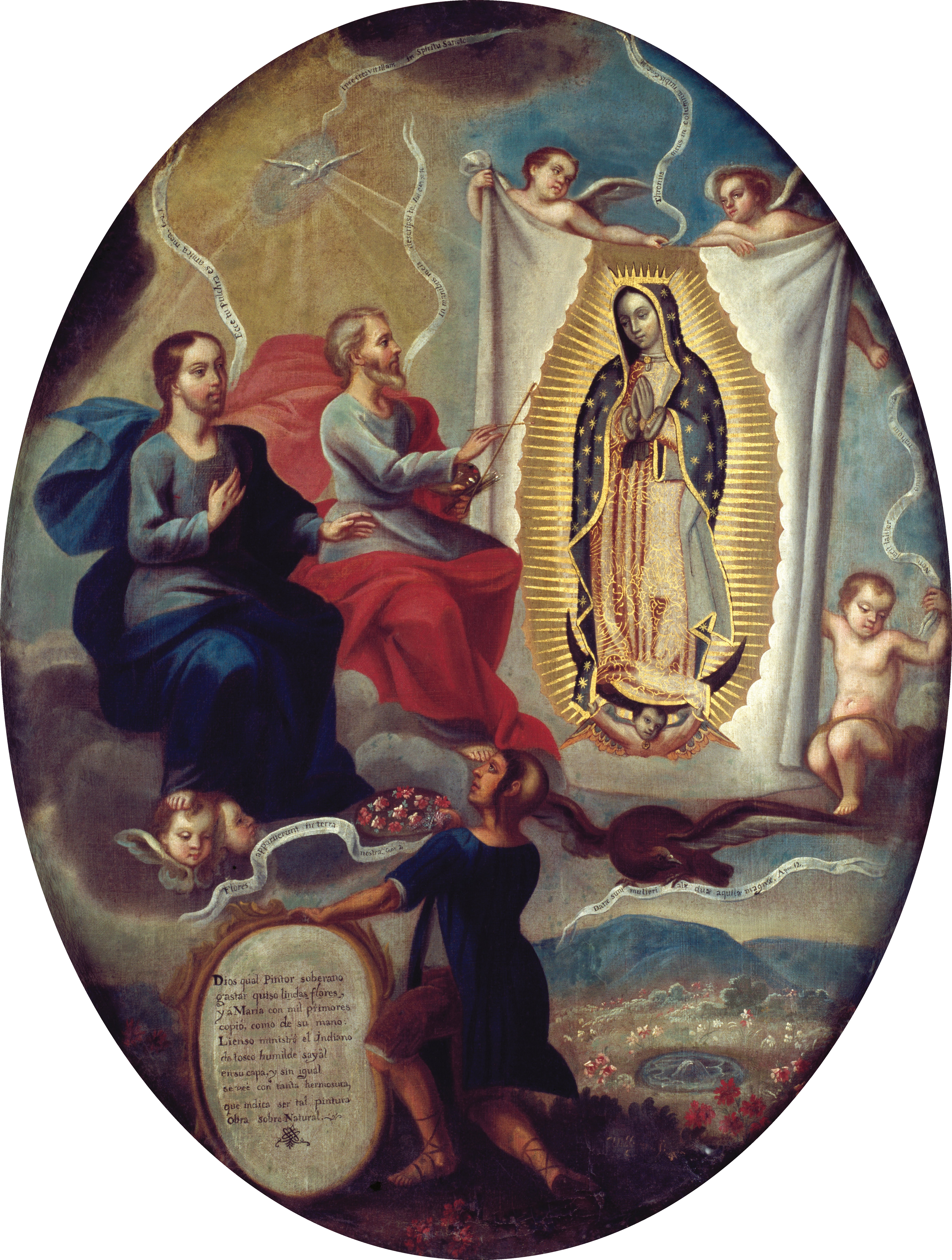
The Eternal Father Painting the Virgin of Guadalupe. Attributed to Joaquín Villegas (1713 – active in 1753) (Mexican) (painter, Museo Nacional de Arte.

During the period before and after European exploration and settlement of the Americas, including North America, Central America, South America and the Islands of the Caribbean, the Antilles, the Lesser Antilles and other island groups, indigenous native cultures produced creative works including architecture, pottery, ceramics, weaving, carving, sculpture, painting and murals as well as other religious and utilitarian objects. Each continent of the Americas hosted societies that were unique and individually developed cultures; that produced totems, works of religious symbolism, and decorative and expressive painted works. African influence was especially strong in the art of the Caribbean and South America. The arts of the indigenous people of the Americas had an enormous impact and influence on European art and vice versa during and after the Age of Exploration. Spain, Portugal, France, The Netherlands, and England were all powerful and influential colonial powers in the Americas during and after the 15th century. By the 19th century cultural influence began to flow both ways across the Atlantic

=== Mexico and Central America ===
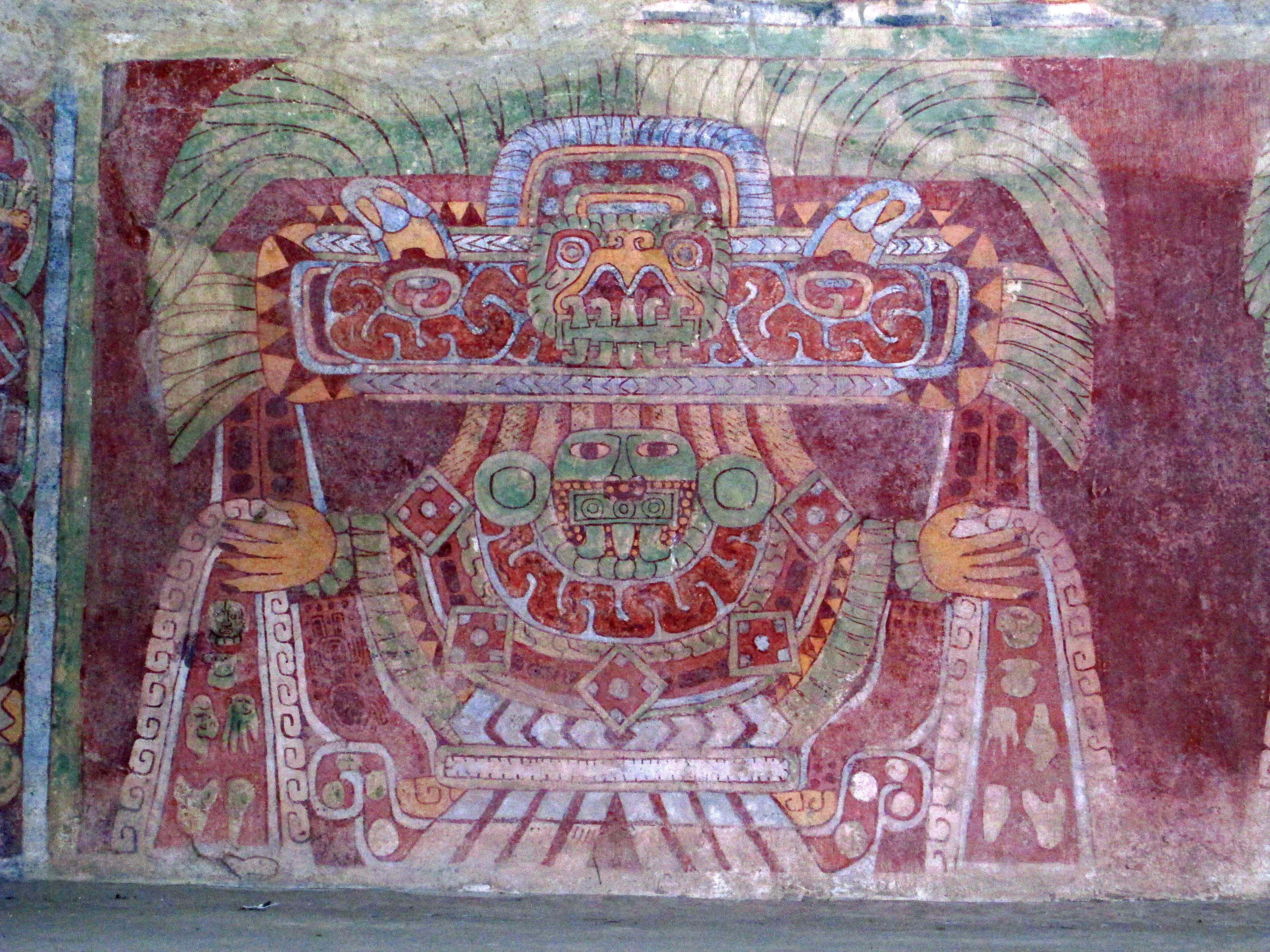
Great Goddess of Teotihuacan mural from the site at Tetitla, Mexico

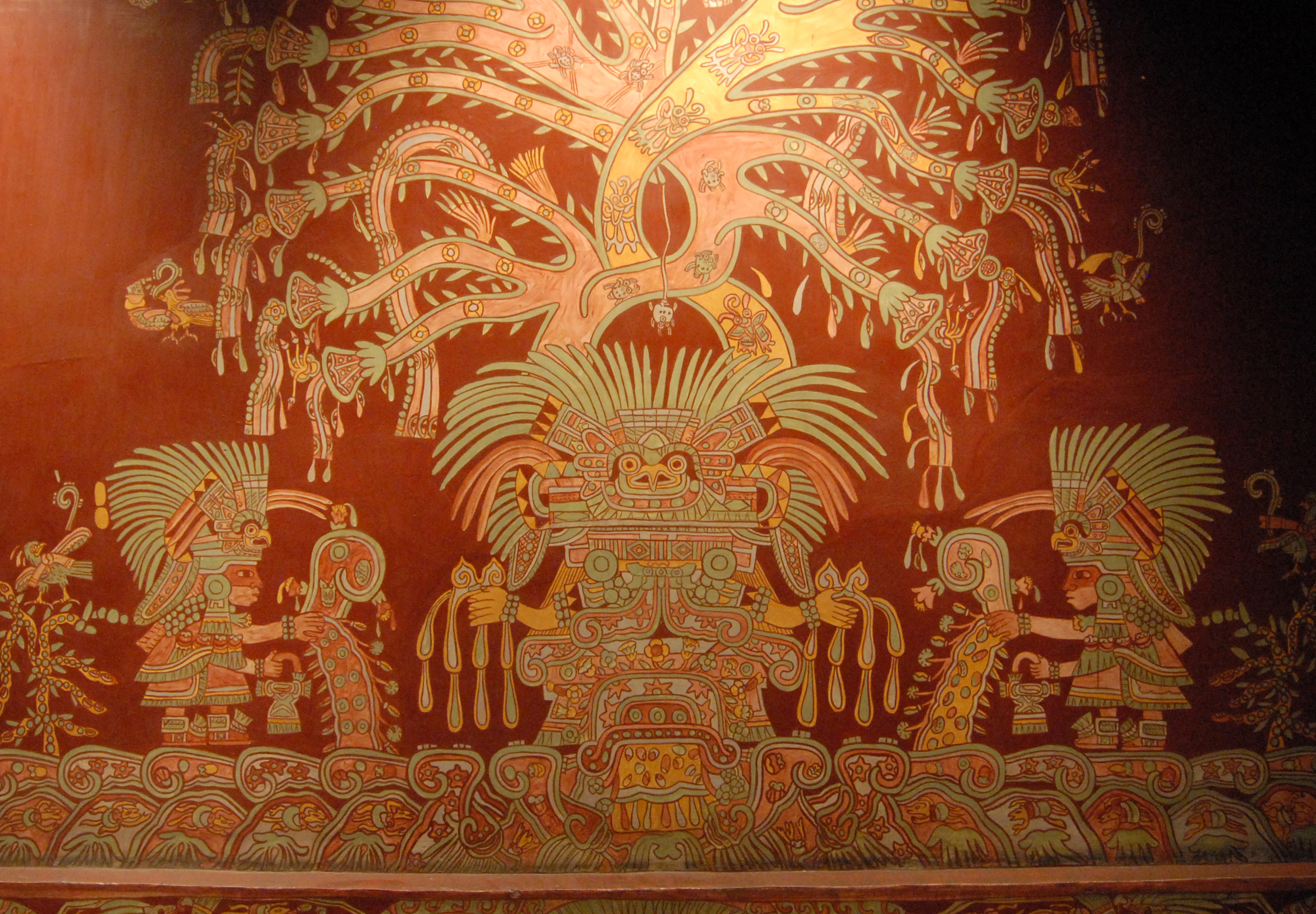
Mural from the Complex of Tepantitla in Teotihuacan, a reproduction in the National Museum of Anthropology in Mexico City

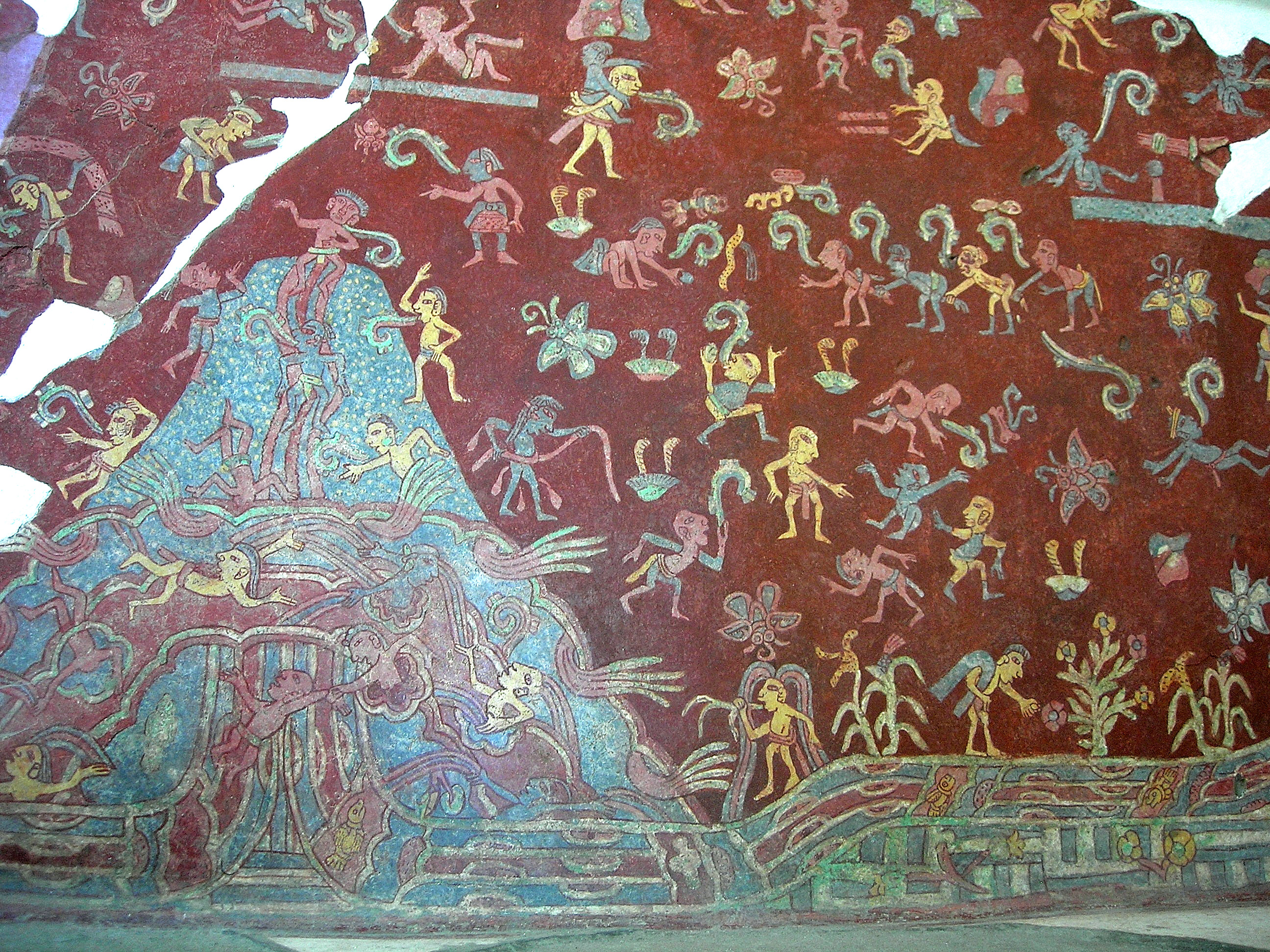
A portion of the mural from the Complex of Tepantitla, represent the Tlalocan one of the levels in the Underworld, Mexico

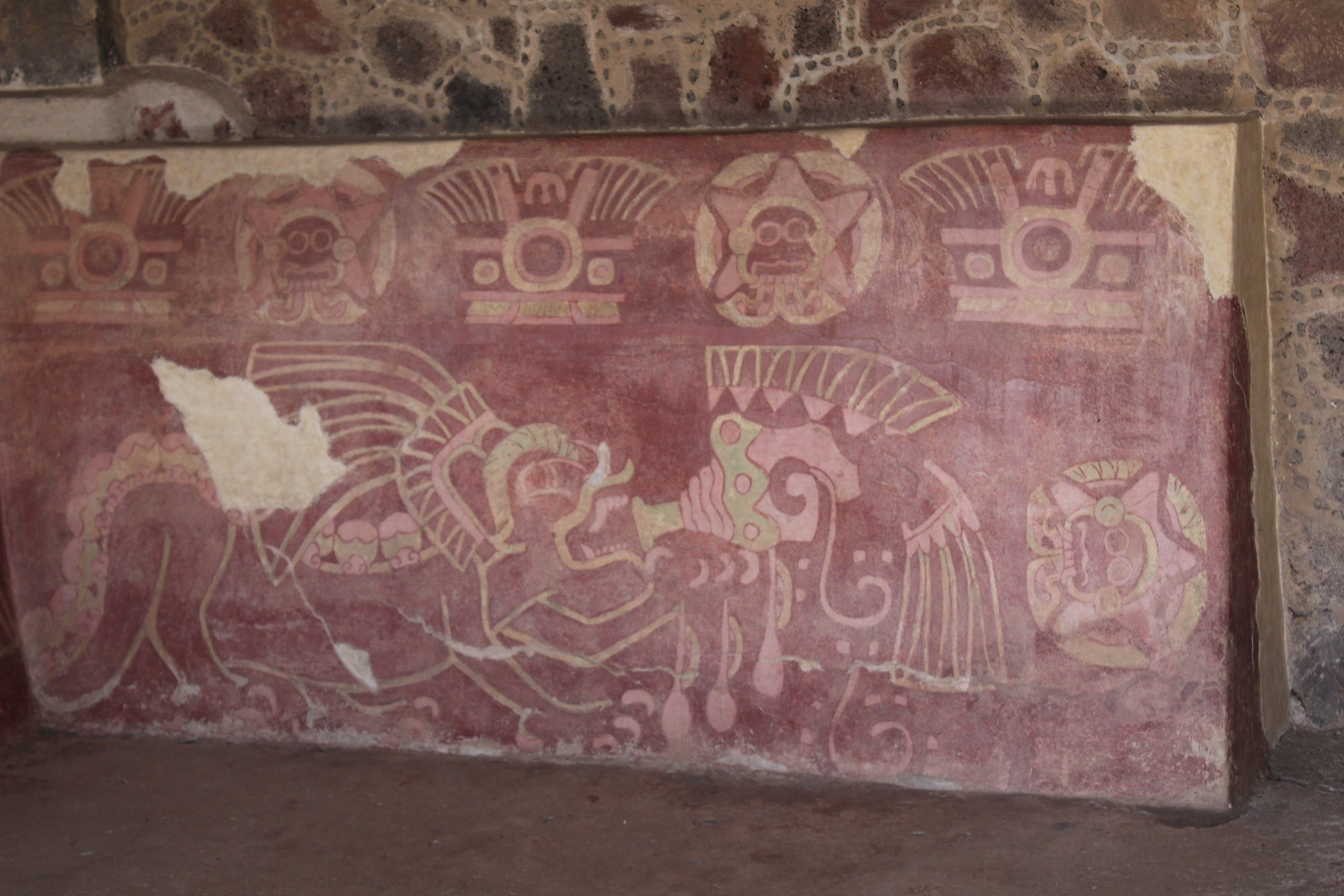
Mural of the Jaguars compound in Teotihuacan.

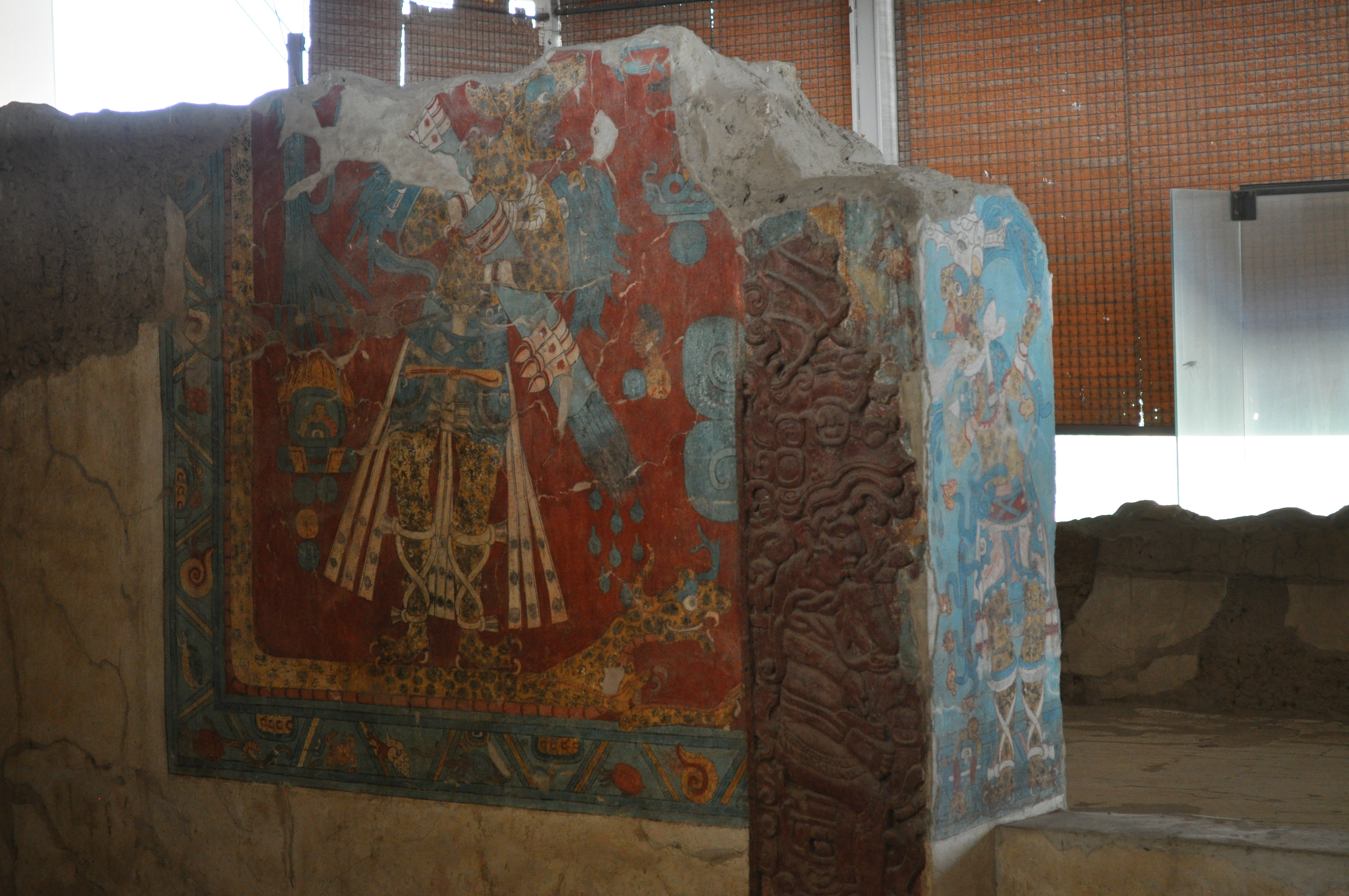
Portic A from Cacaxtla, represent the Man-jaguar

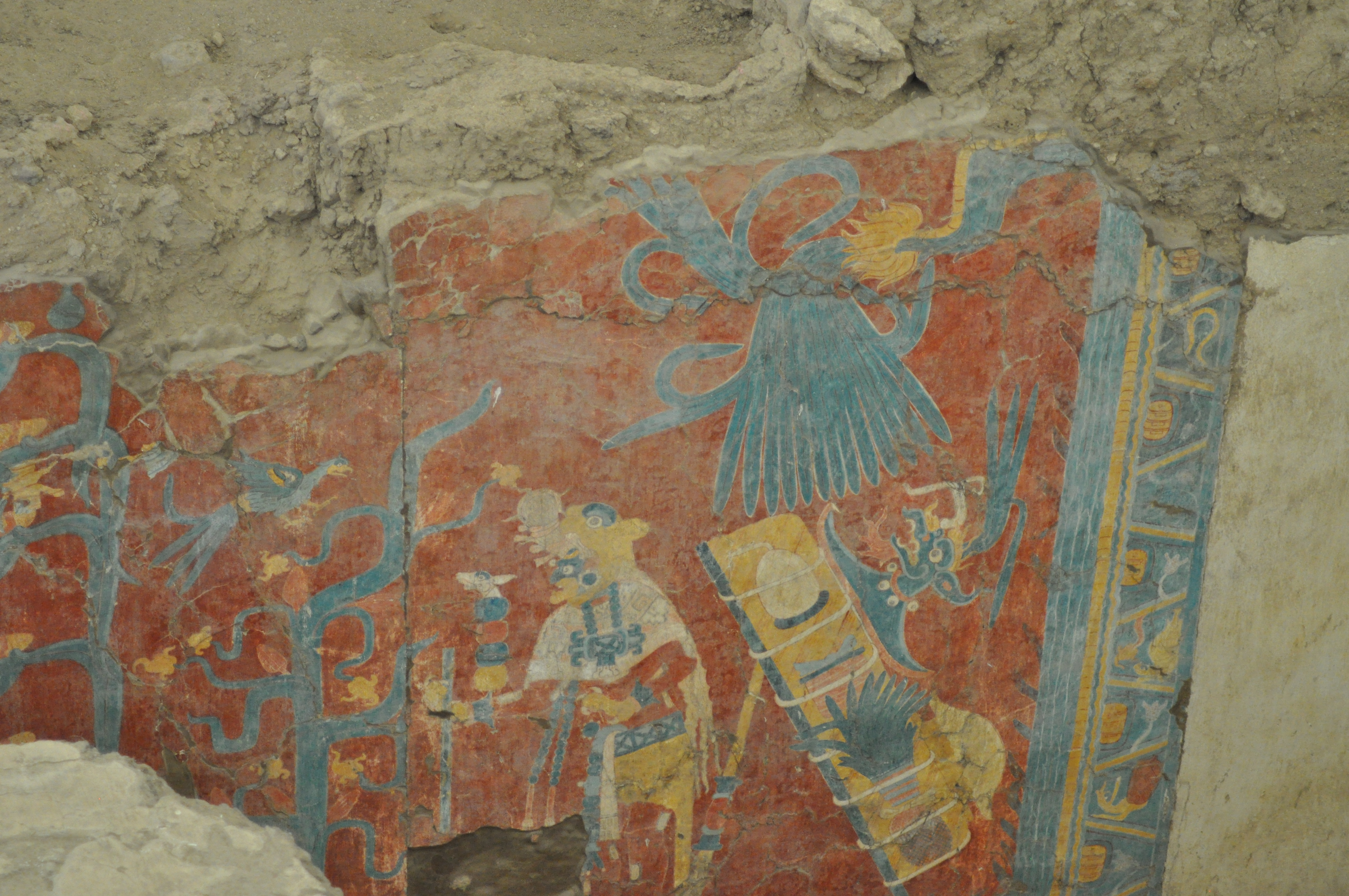
Detail from the Red Temple, c.600–700, Cacaxtla, Mexico

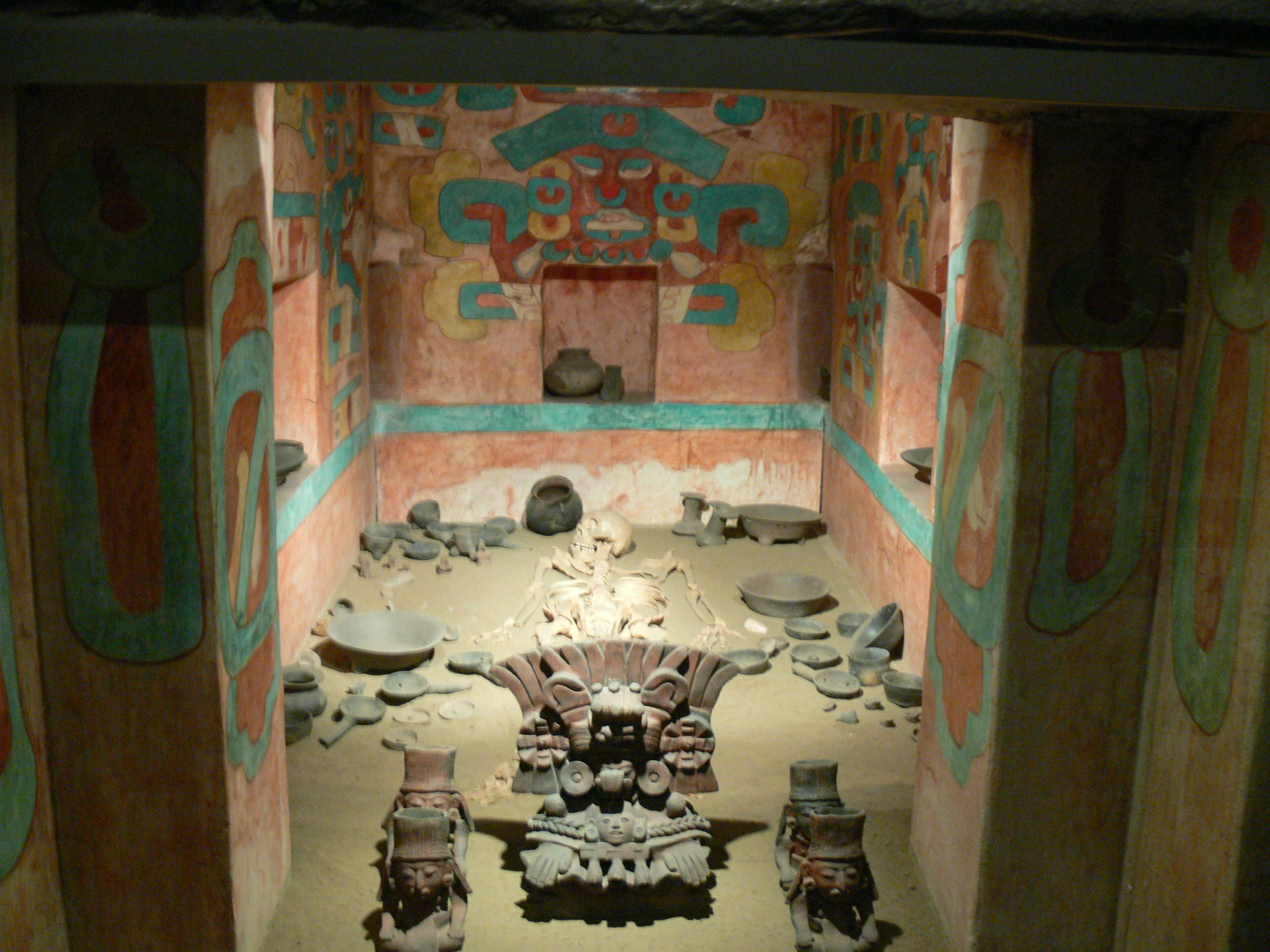
Reconstruction of the Tomb 105 from Monte Alban.

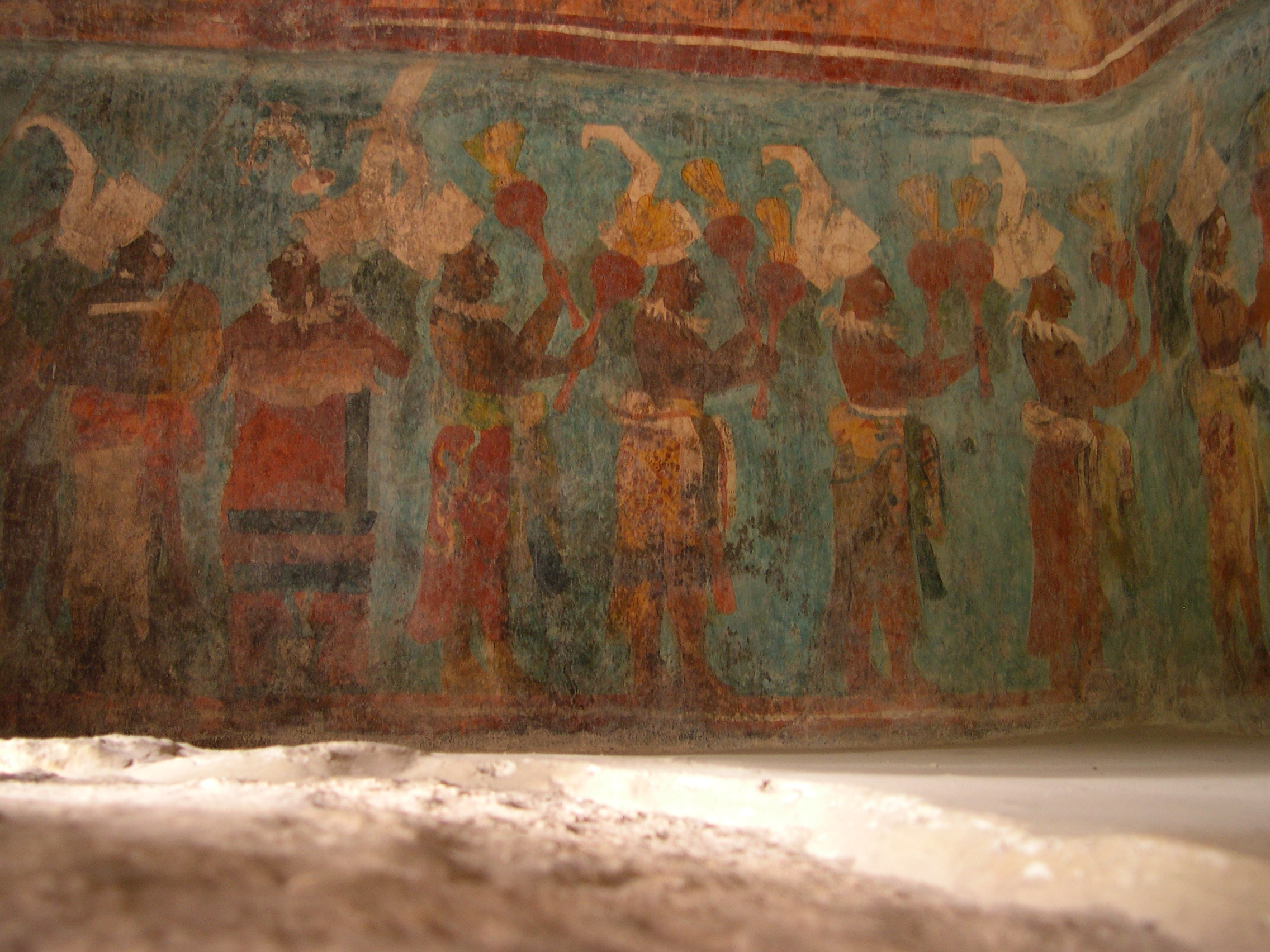
A Mayan mural from Bonampak, Mexico, 580–800 AD.

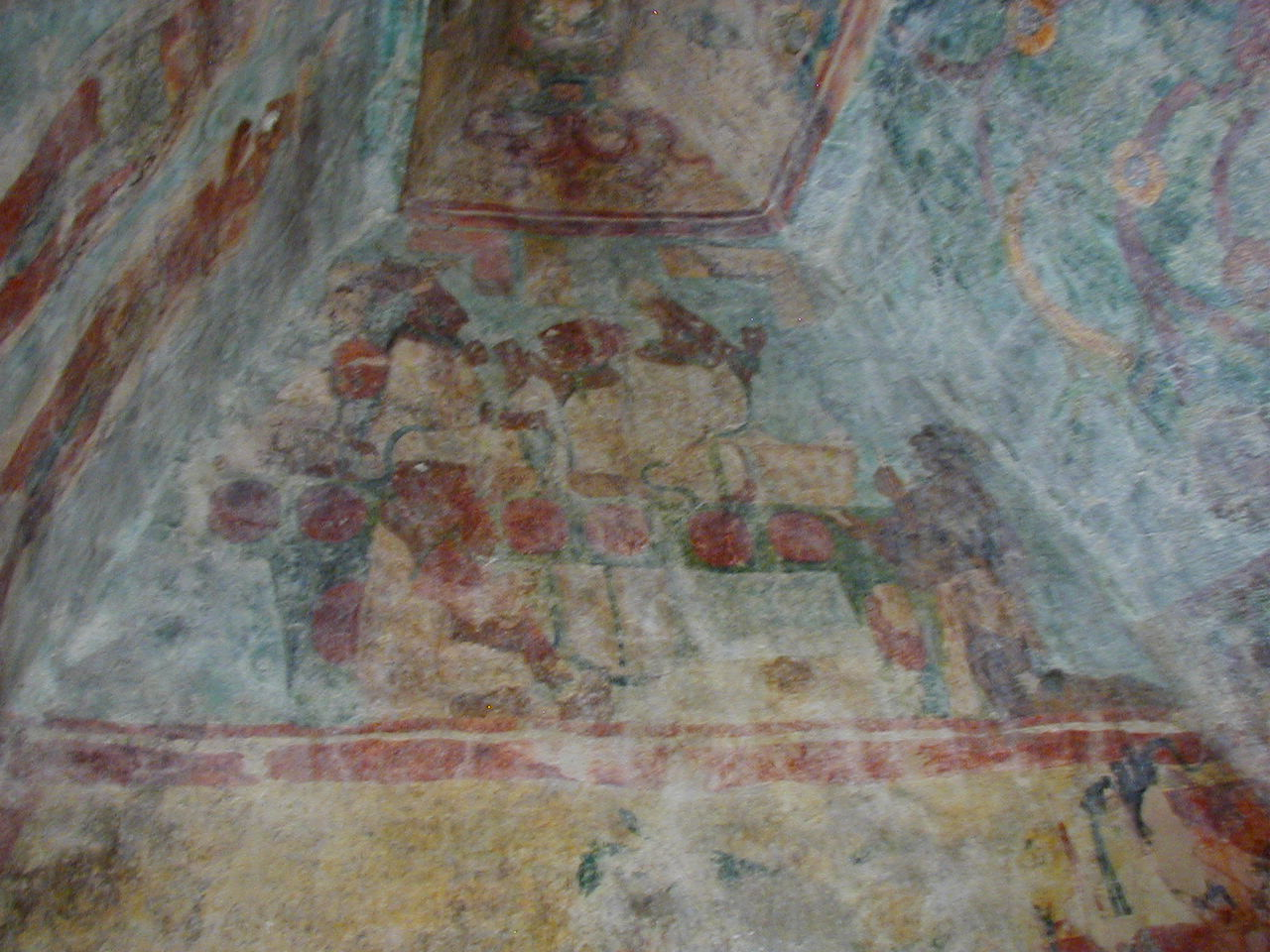
A Mayan mural from Bonampak, 580–800 AD

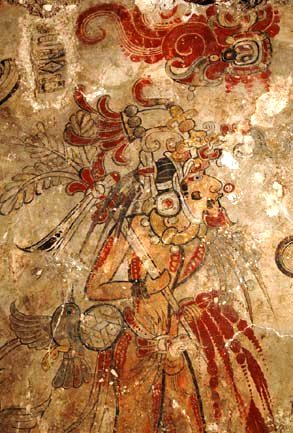
A Mayan mural from San Bartolo, Pre-Classical period (1–250 AD)

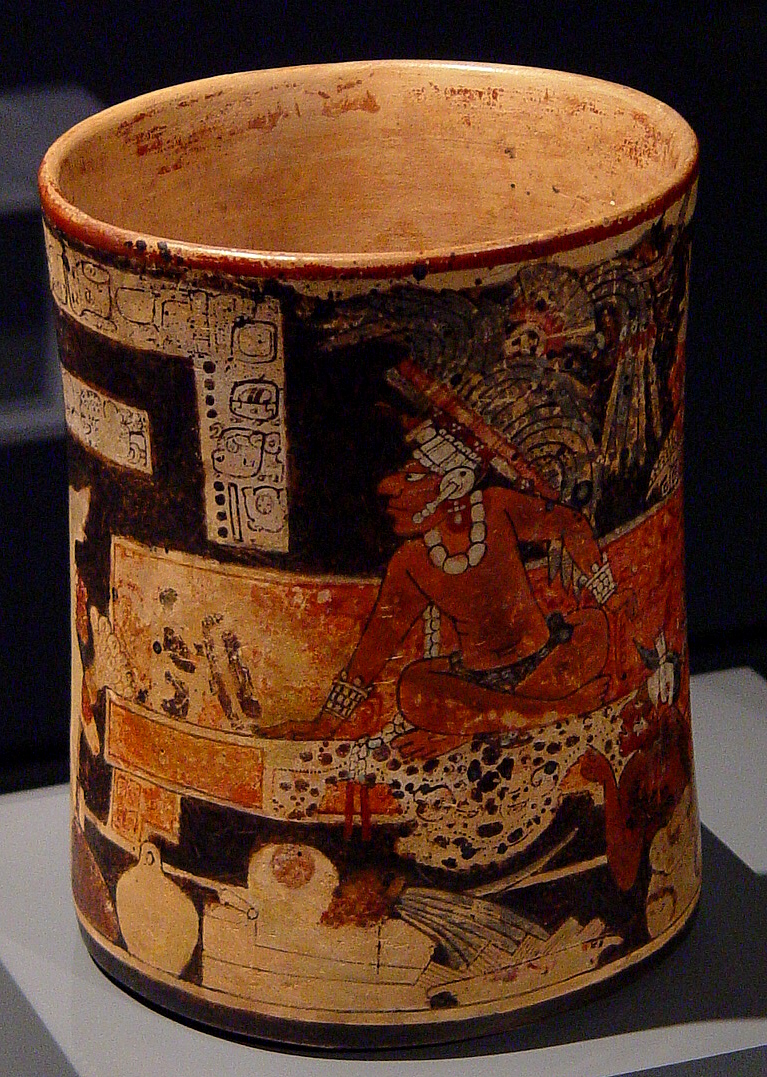
Painting on the Lord of the jaguar pelt throne vase, a scene of the Maya court, 700–800 AD.

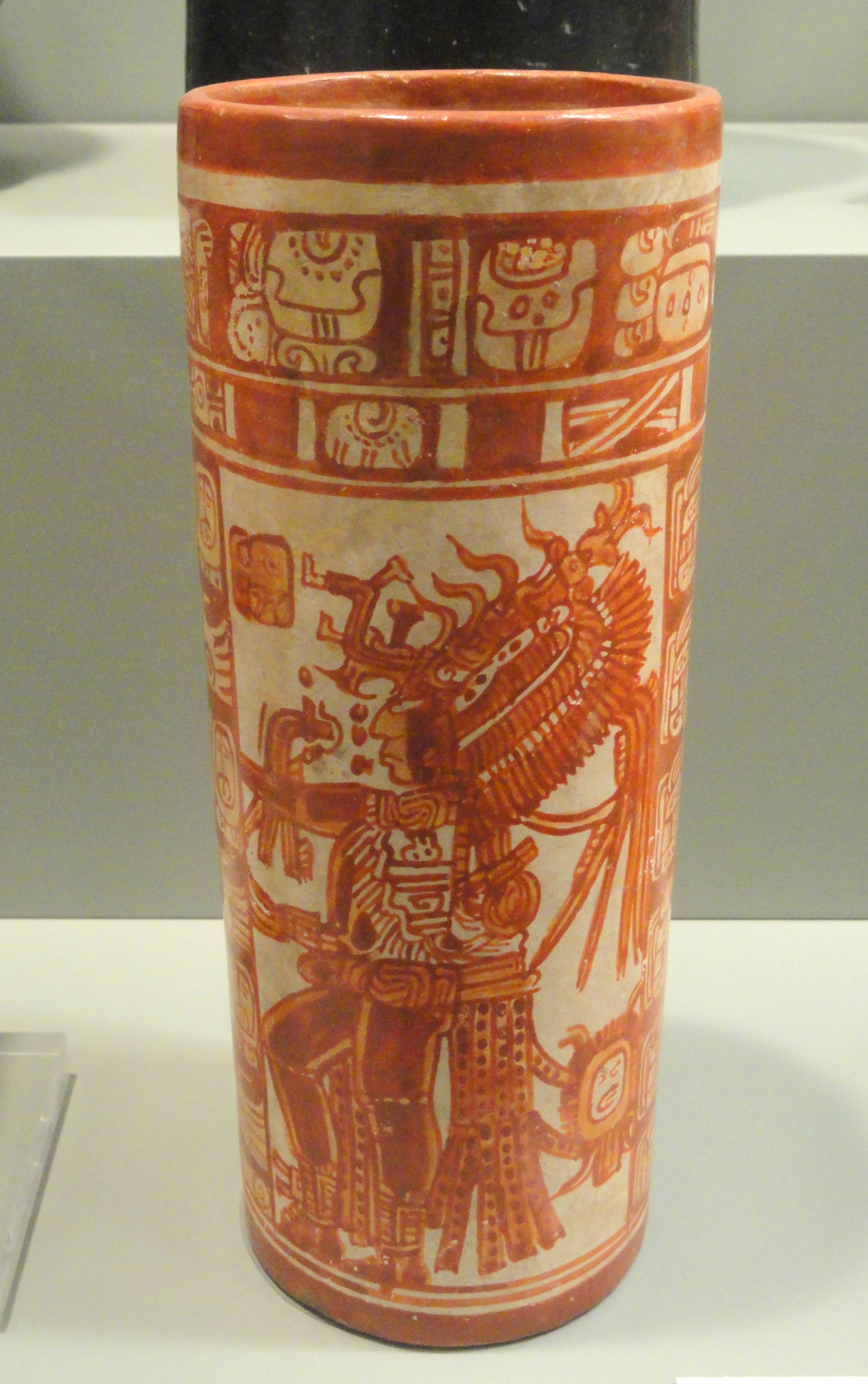
Painting on a Maya vase from the Late Classical Period (600–900)

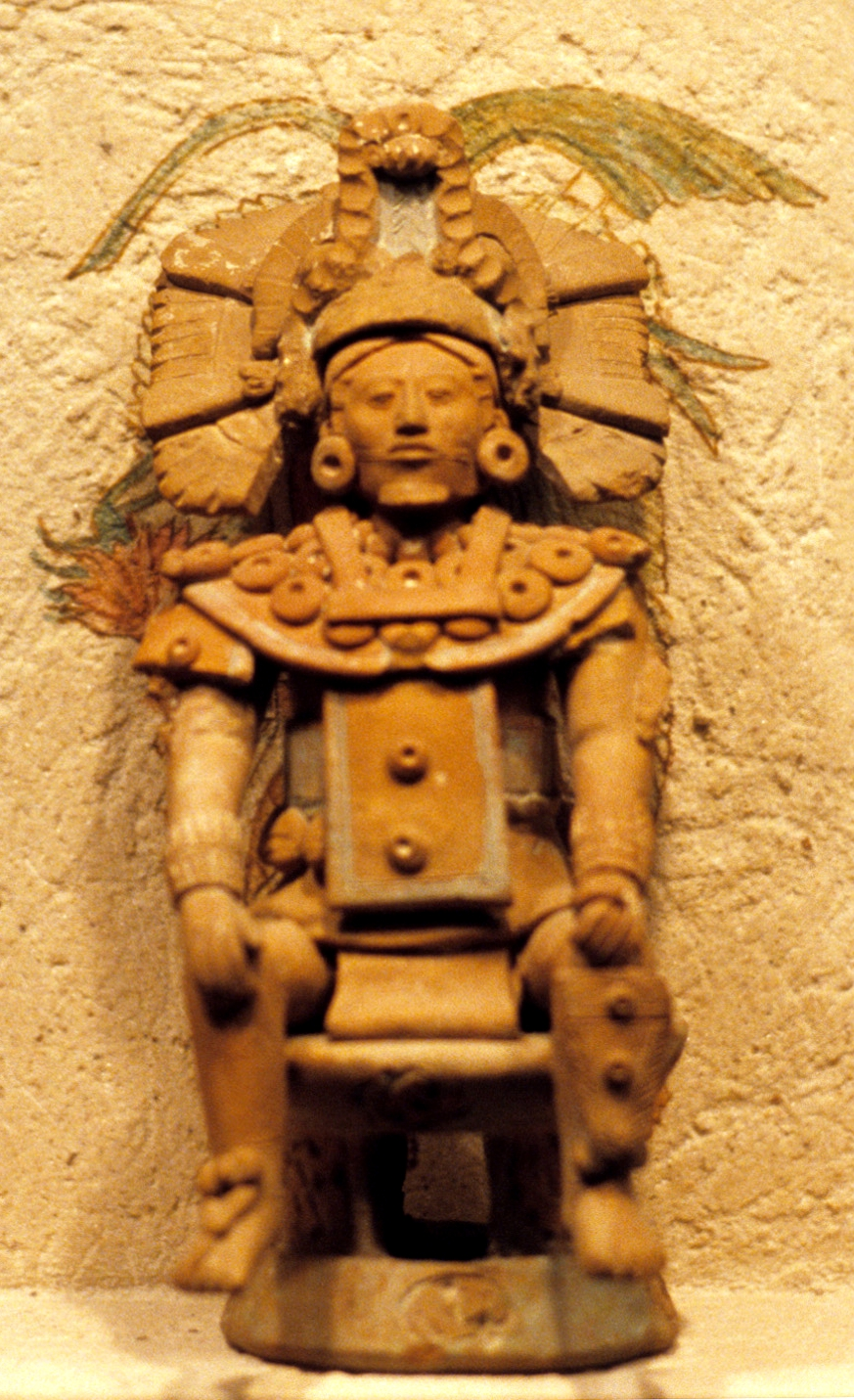
Painted pottery figurine of a King from the burial site at Jaina Island, Mayan art, 400–800 AD

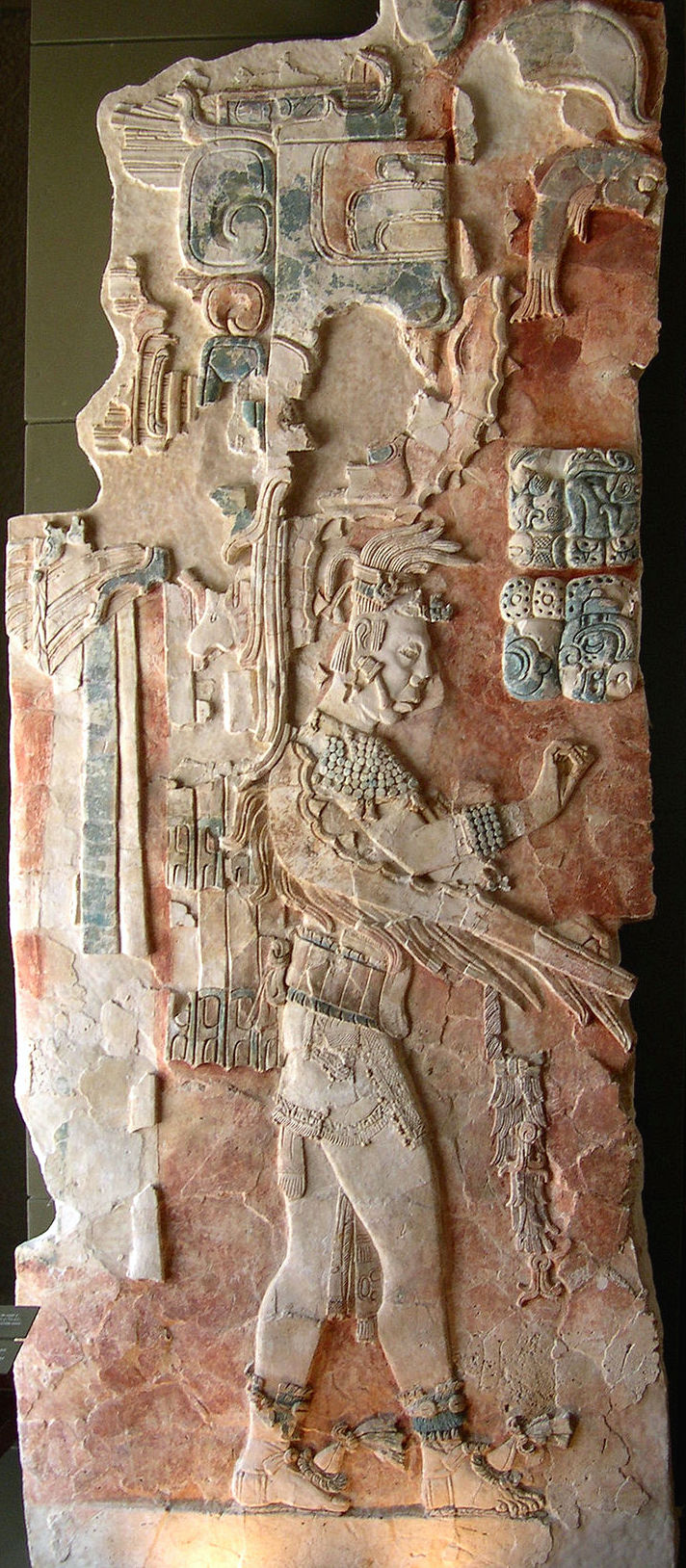
Painted relief of the Maya site Palenque, featuring the son of K'inich Ahkal Mo' Naab' III (678–730s?, r. 722–729).

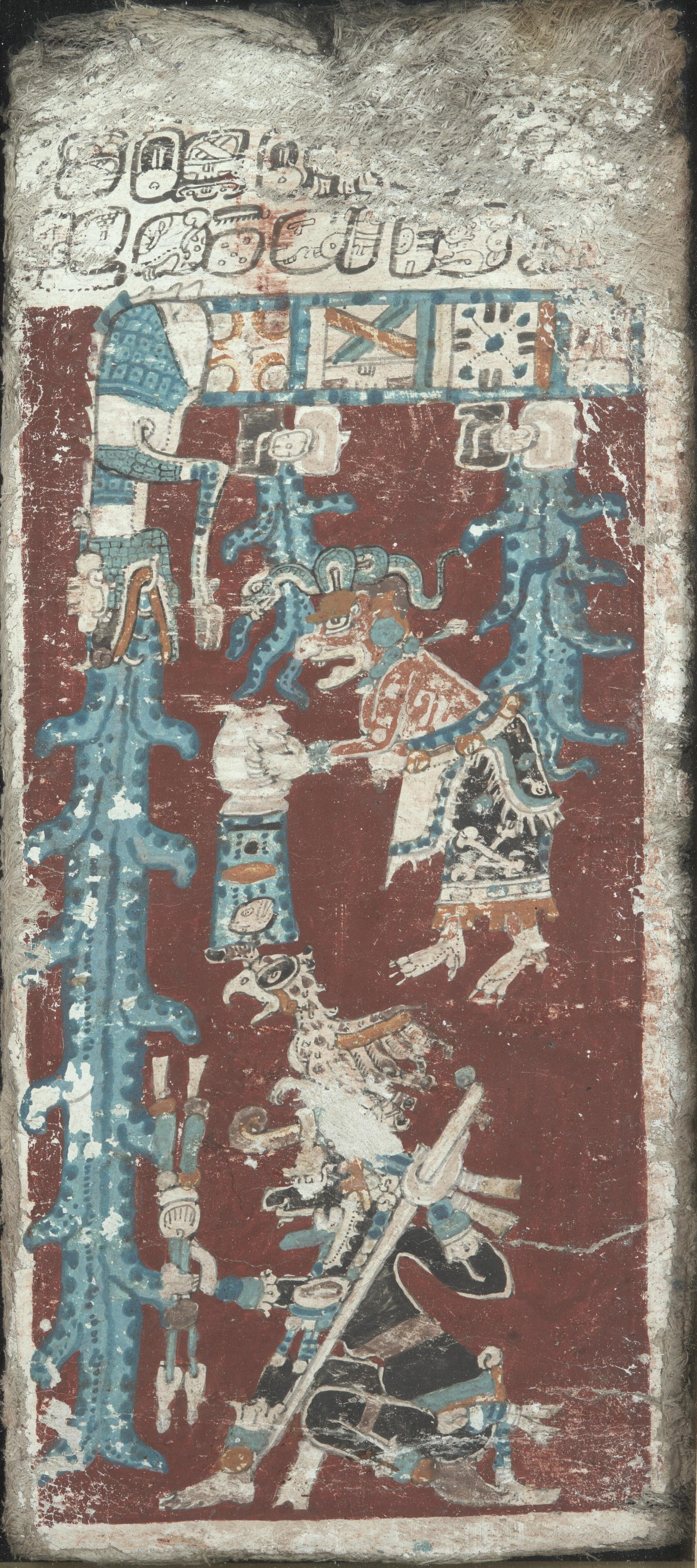
Painting from a Dresden Codex.

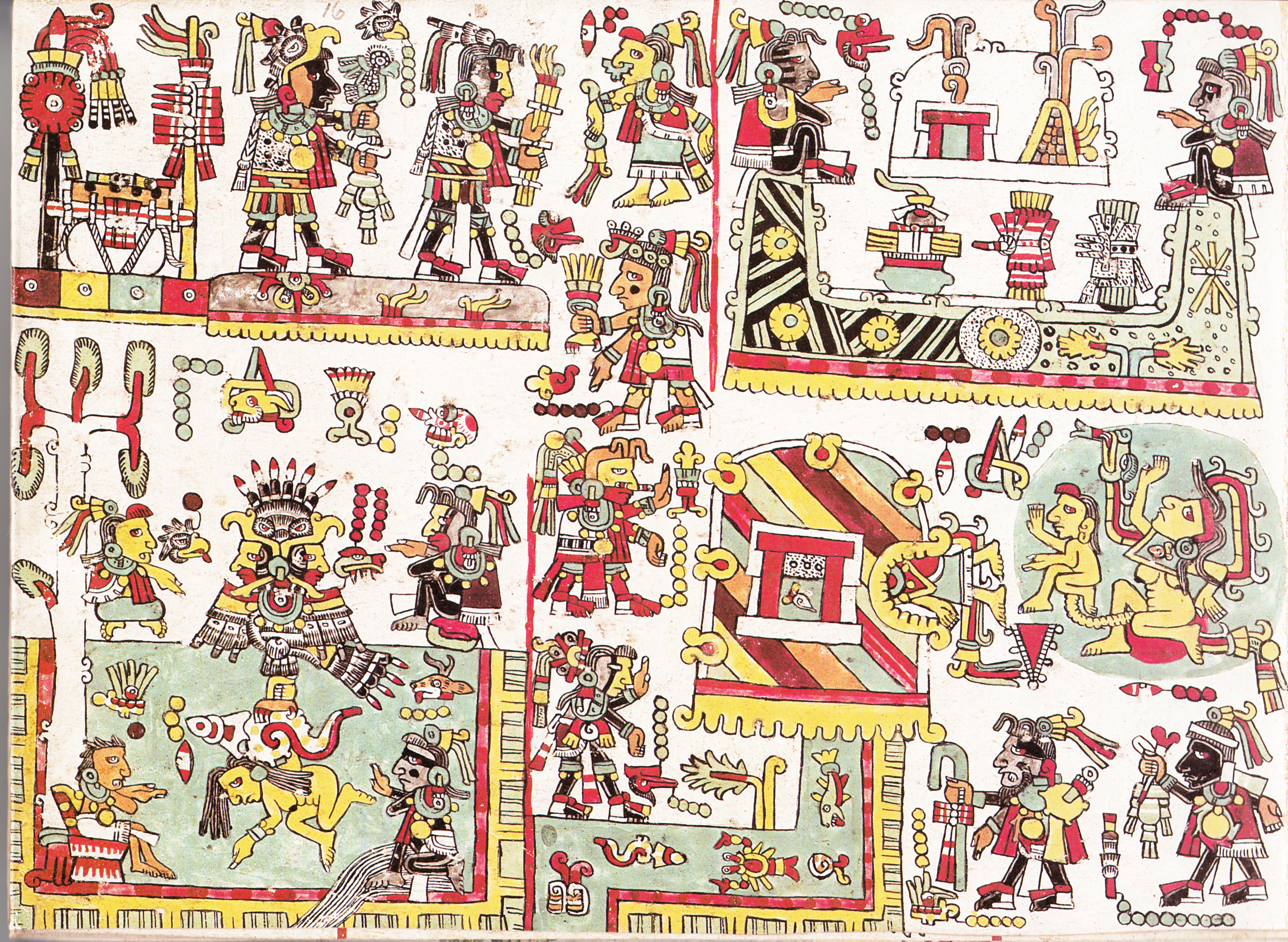
A Mixtec painting from the Codex Zouche-Nuttall.

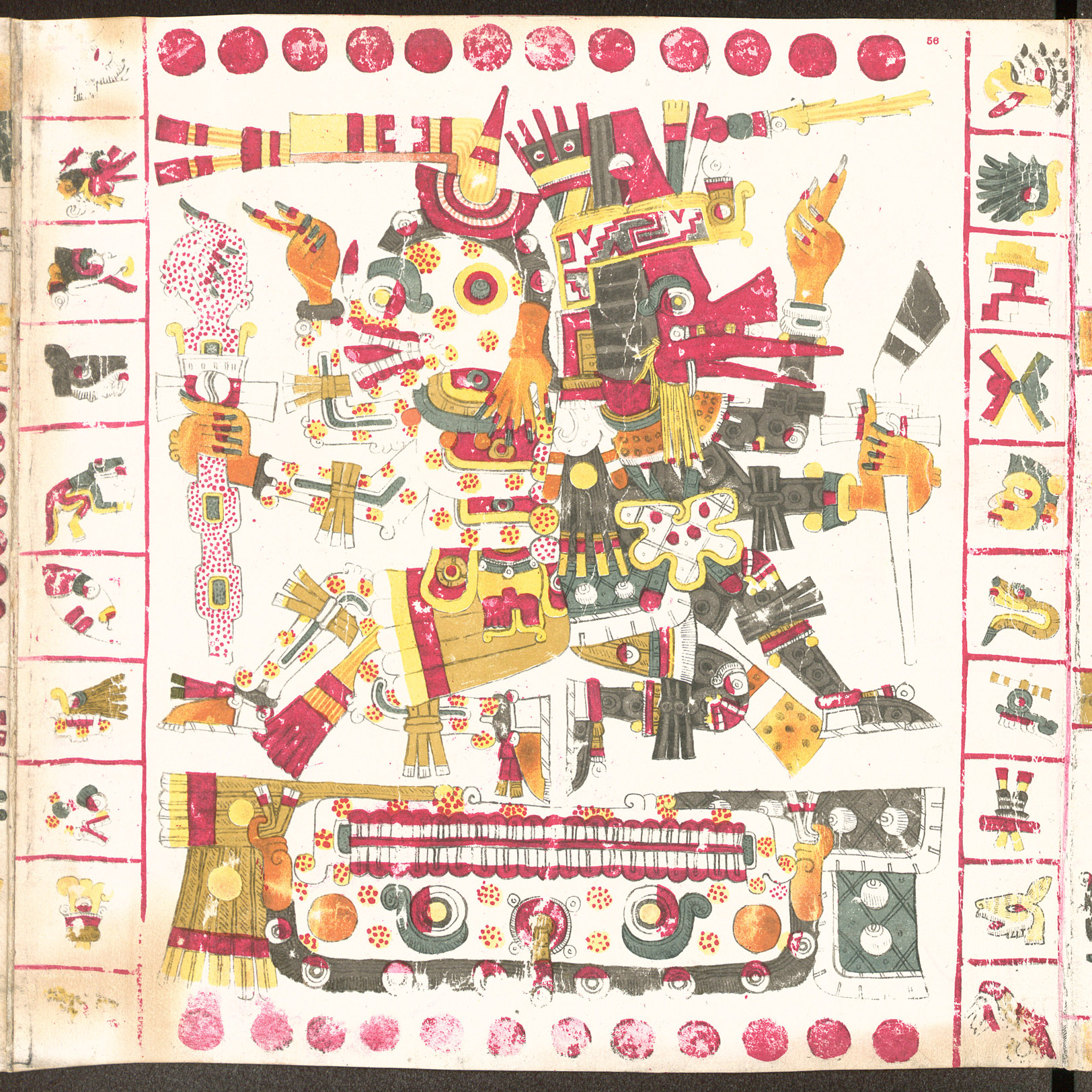
An Aztec painting from the Codex Borgia, represent a Mictlantecuhtli and Quetzalcoatl.

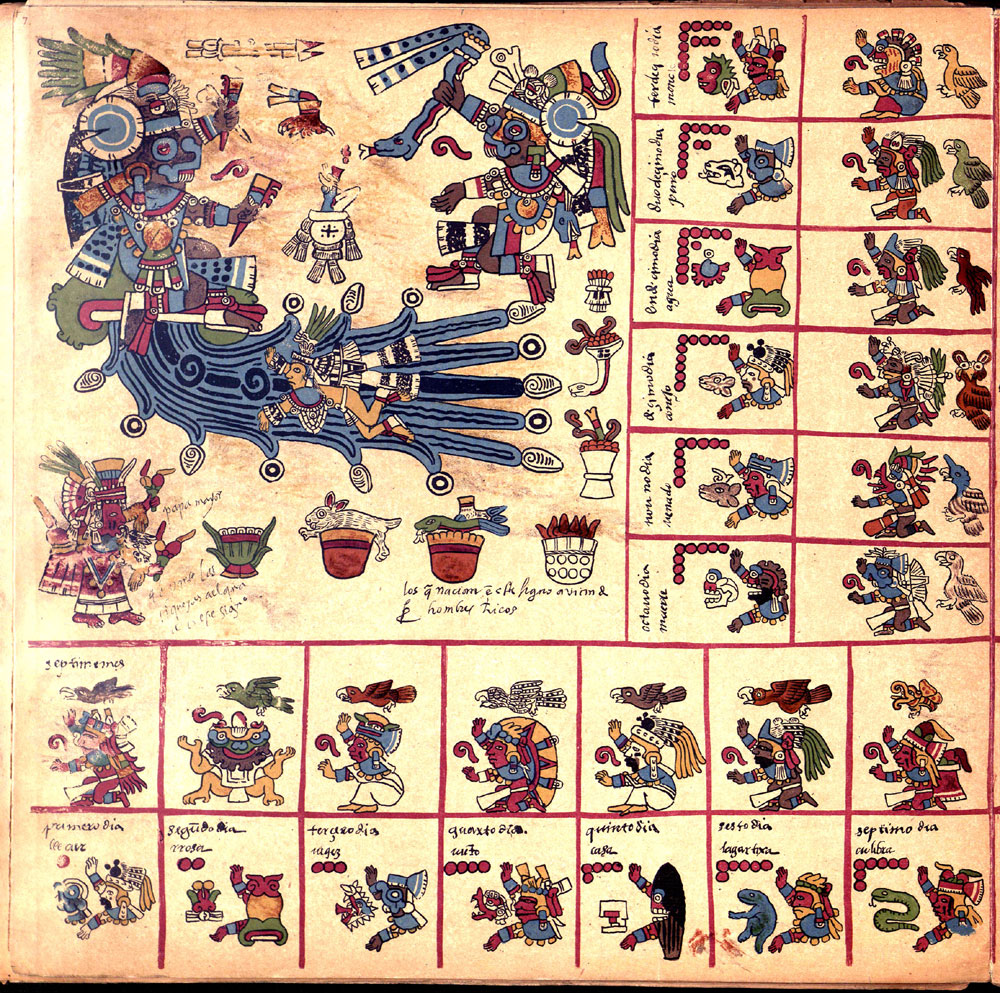
An Aztec painting from the Codex Borbonicus, represent a Tlaloc.

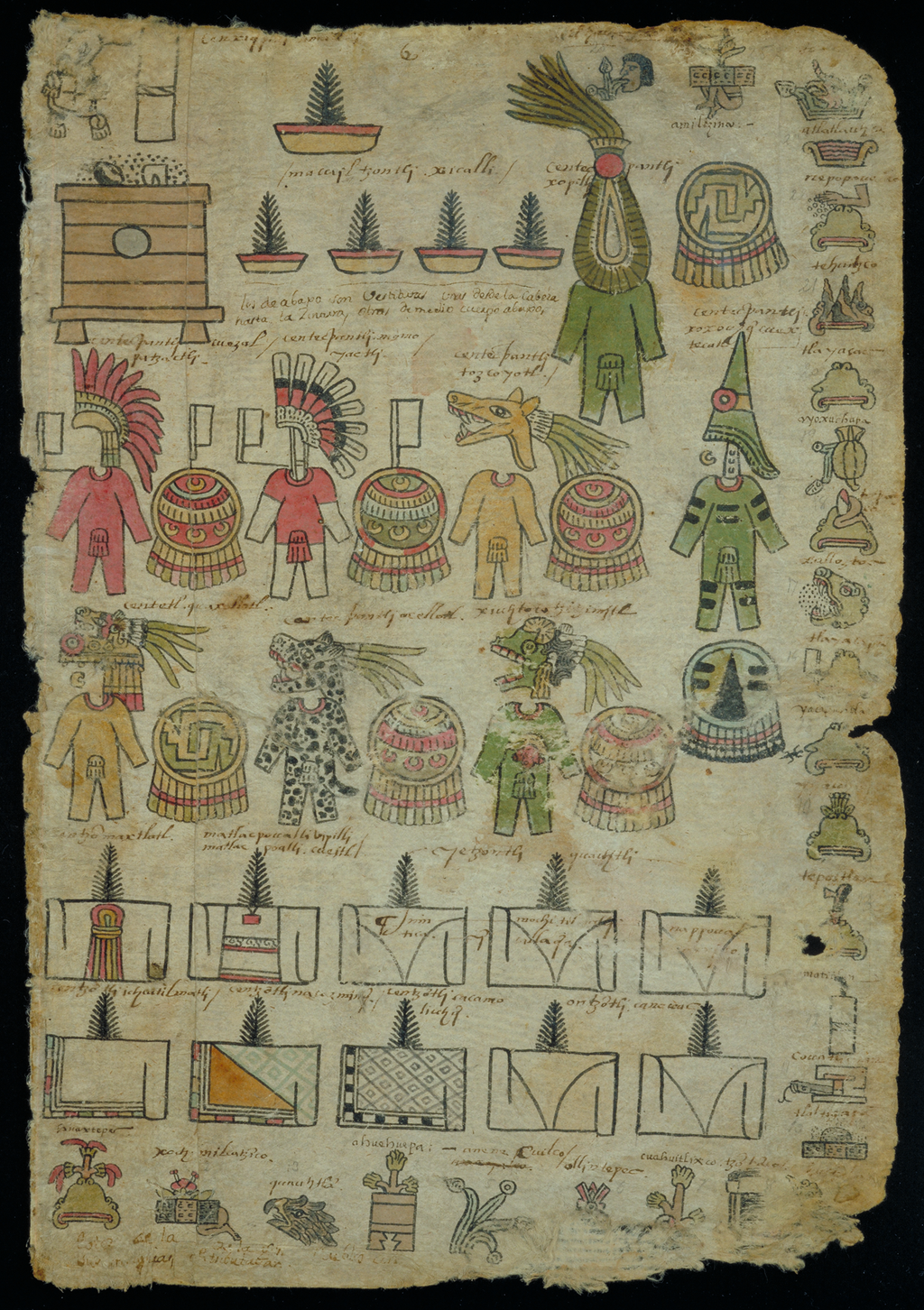
A painting from Matrícula de Tributos showing the Ichcahuipilli, Mexico.

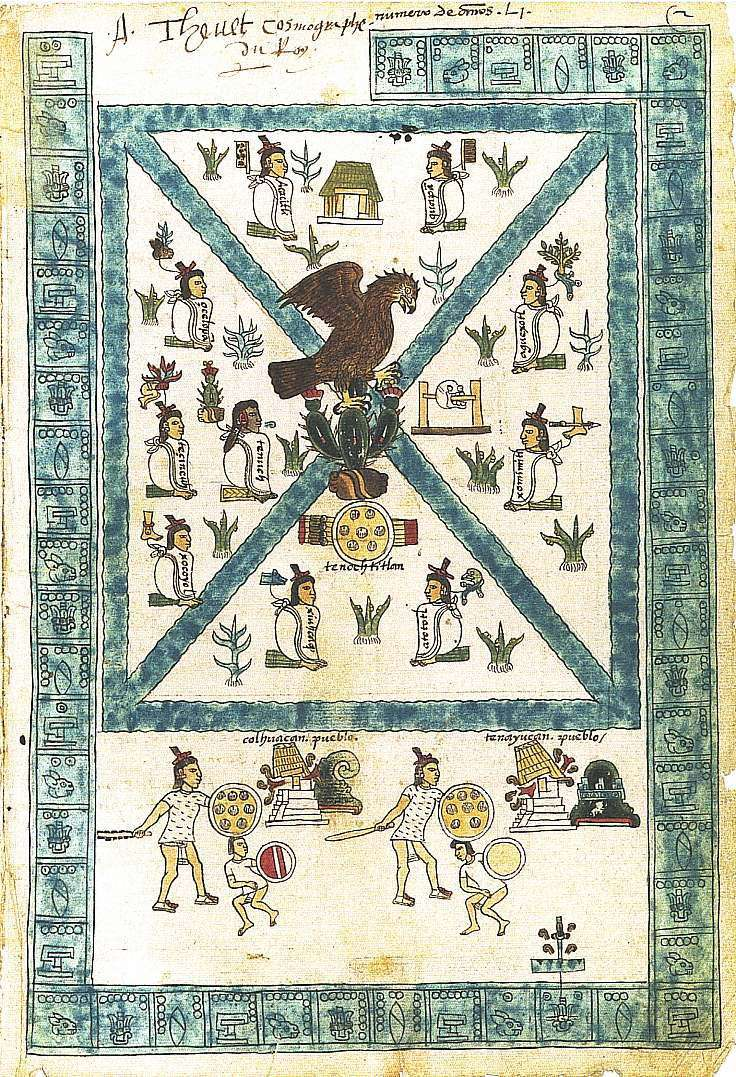
A painting from Codex Mendoza showing the Aztec legend of the foundation of Tenochtitlán, c.1553

=== South America ===
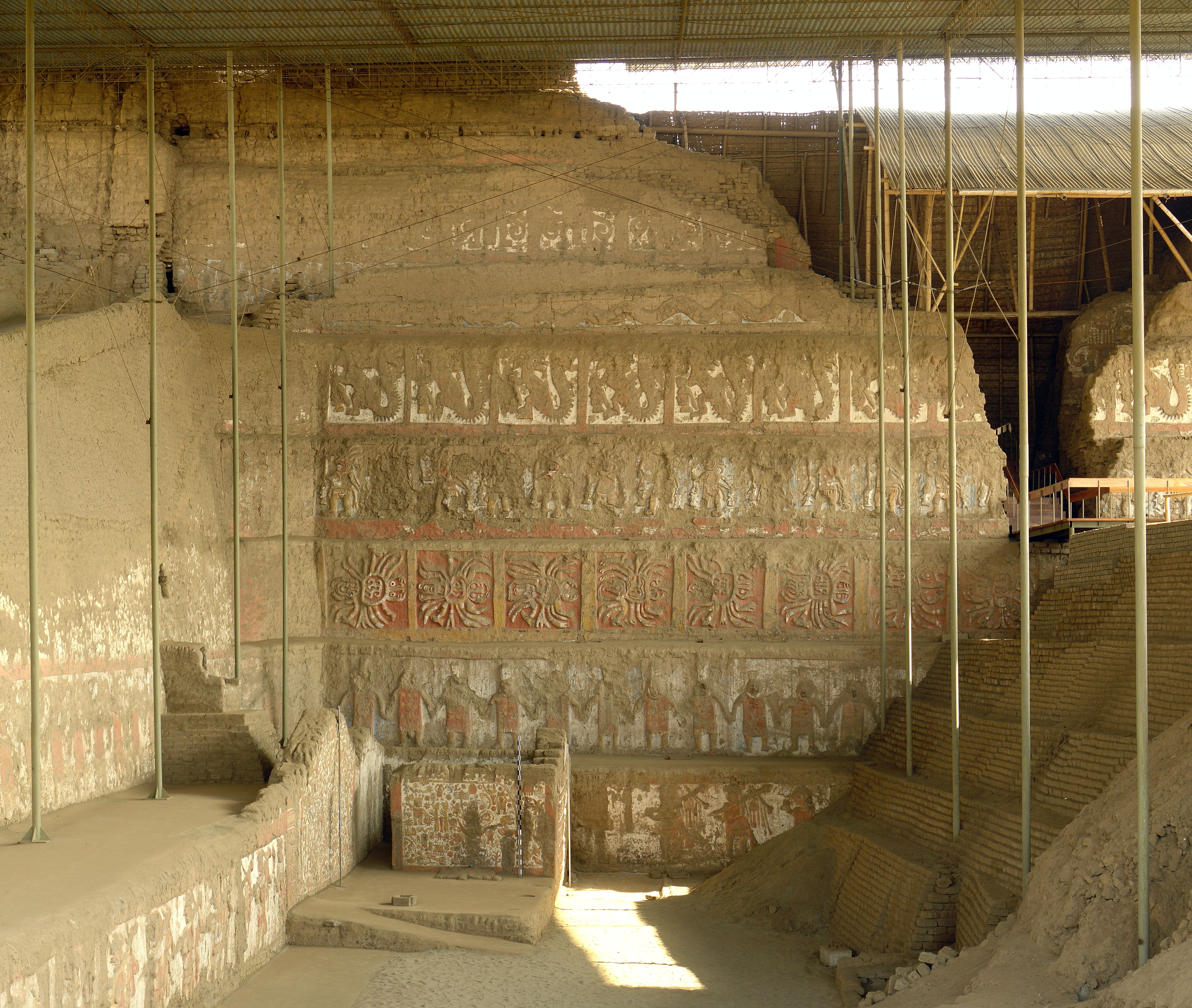
Moche murals from the Huaca de la Luna site, Peru, 100–700 AD.

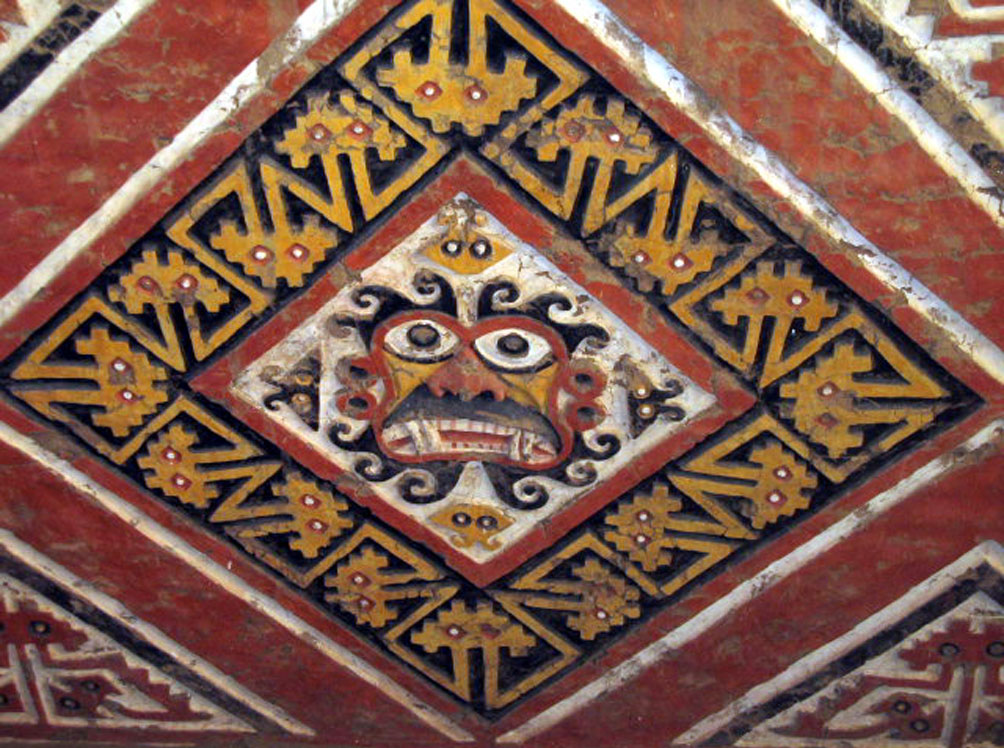
A Moche mural of a decapitator from the Huaca de la Luna site, Peru, 100–700 AD.

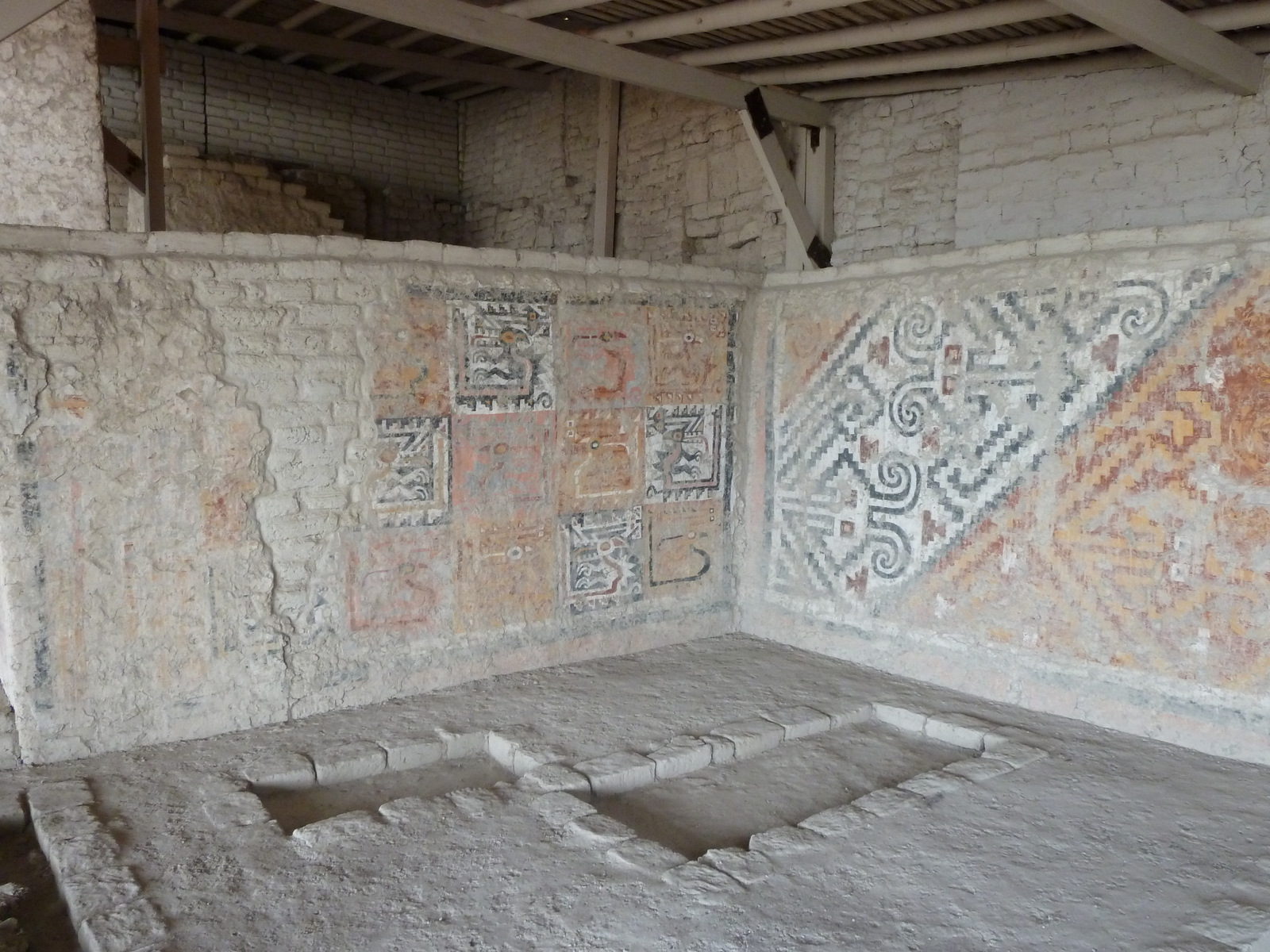
Mural in Huaca Cao Viejo, Peru

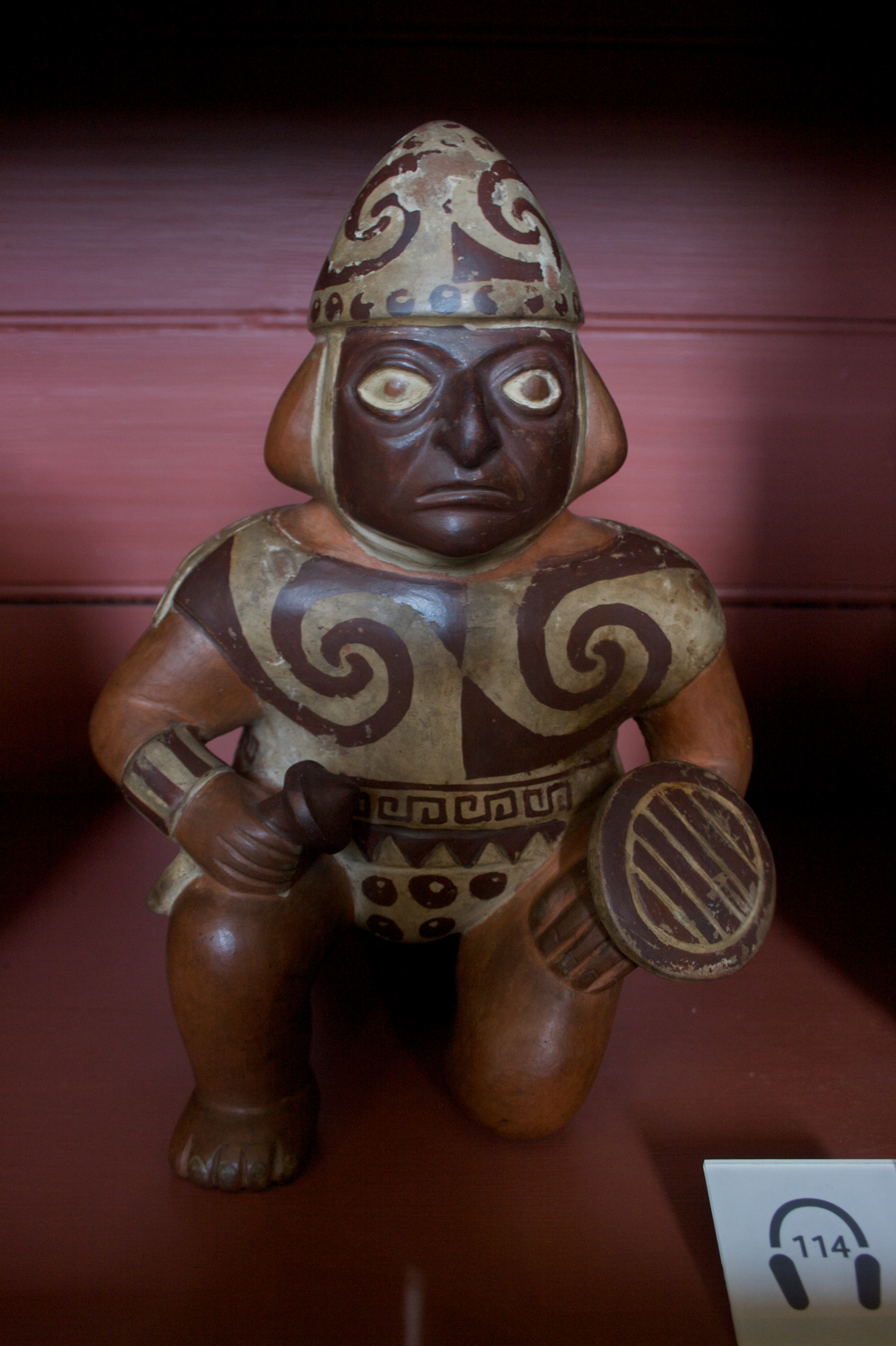
Painted pottery from the Moche culture of Peru

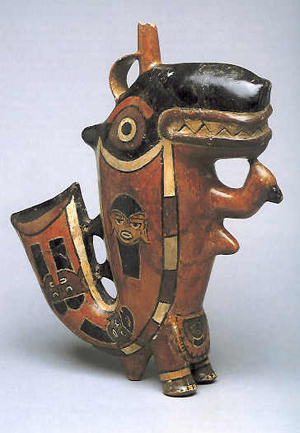
Killer Whale, painted pottery, Nazca culture, 300 BC–800 AD, Larco Museum. Lima, Peru

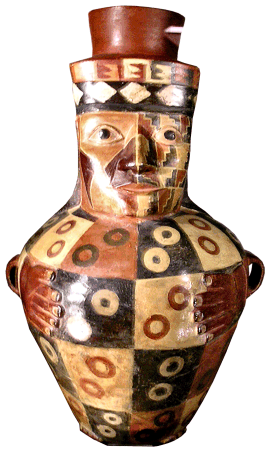
Painted pottery from the Huari culture of Peru, 500–1200 AD

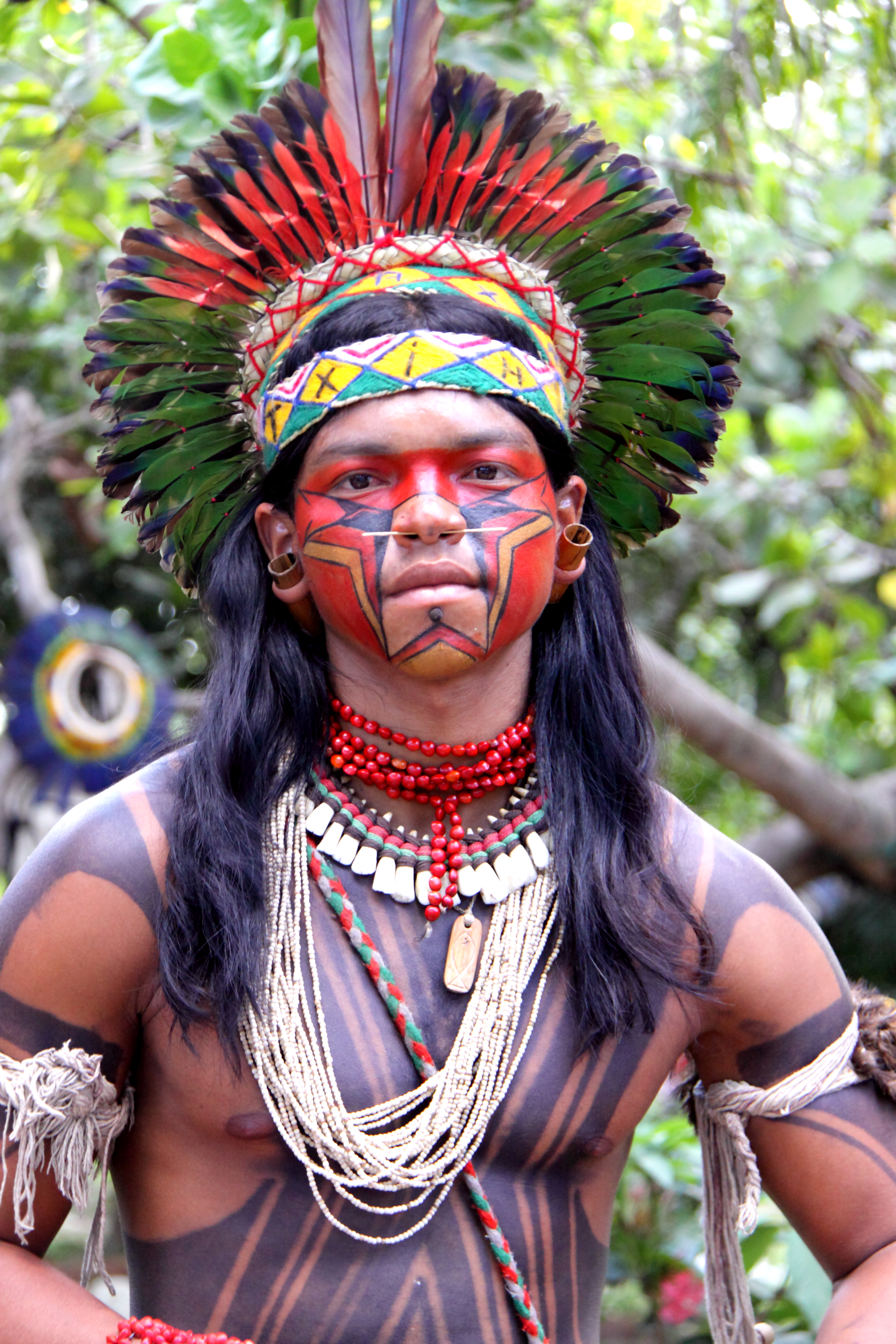
Body painting, Indigenous peoples in Brazil, Pataxo tribe.

=== North America ===
==== United States ====
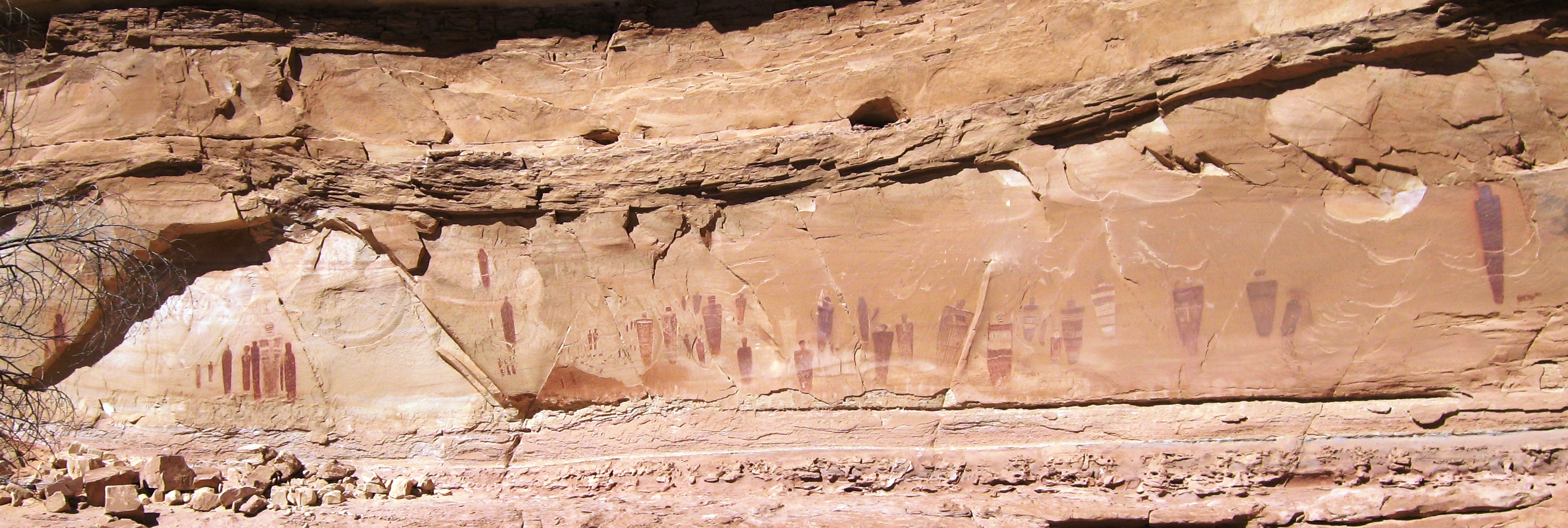
The Great Gallery, Pictographs, Canyonlands National Park, Horseshoe Canyon, Utah, 15 by 200 feet (4.6 by 61.0 m), c. 1500 BCE

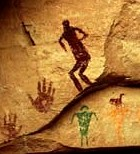
Pictograph, southeastern Utah, c. 1200 BC Pueblo culture

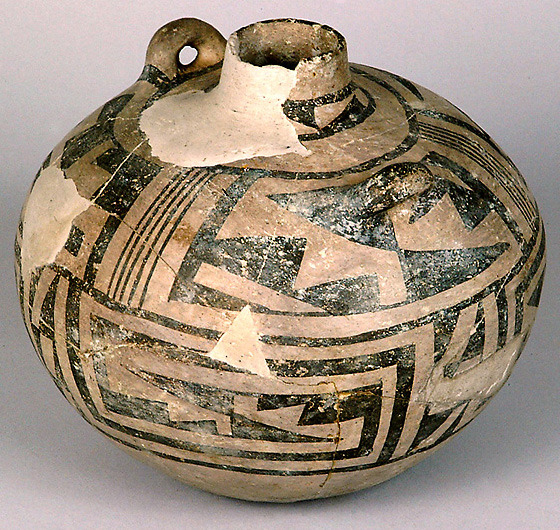
Painted pottery, Anasazi, North America: A canteen (pot) excavated from the ruins in Chaco Canyon, New Mexico, c. 700 AD–1100 AD

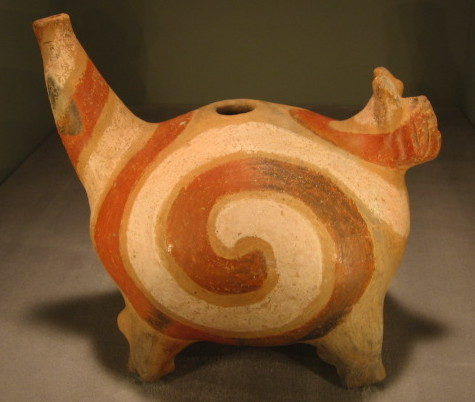
Painted ceramic jug showing the underwater panther from the Mississippian culture, found at Rose Mound in Cross County, Arkansas, c. 1400–1600.

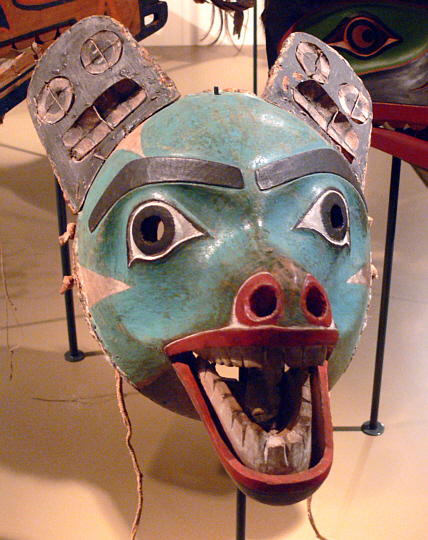
A Haida wolf mask, 1880.

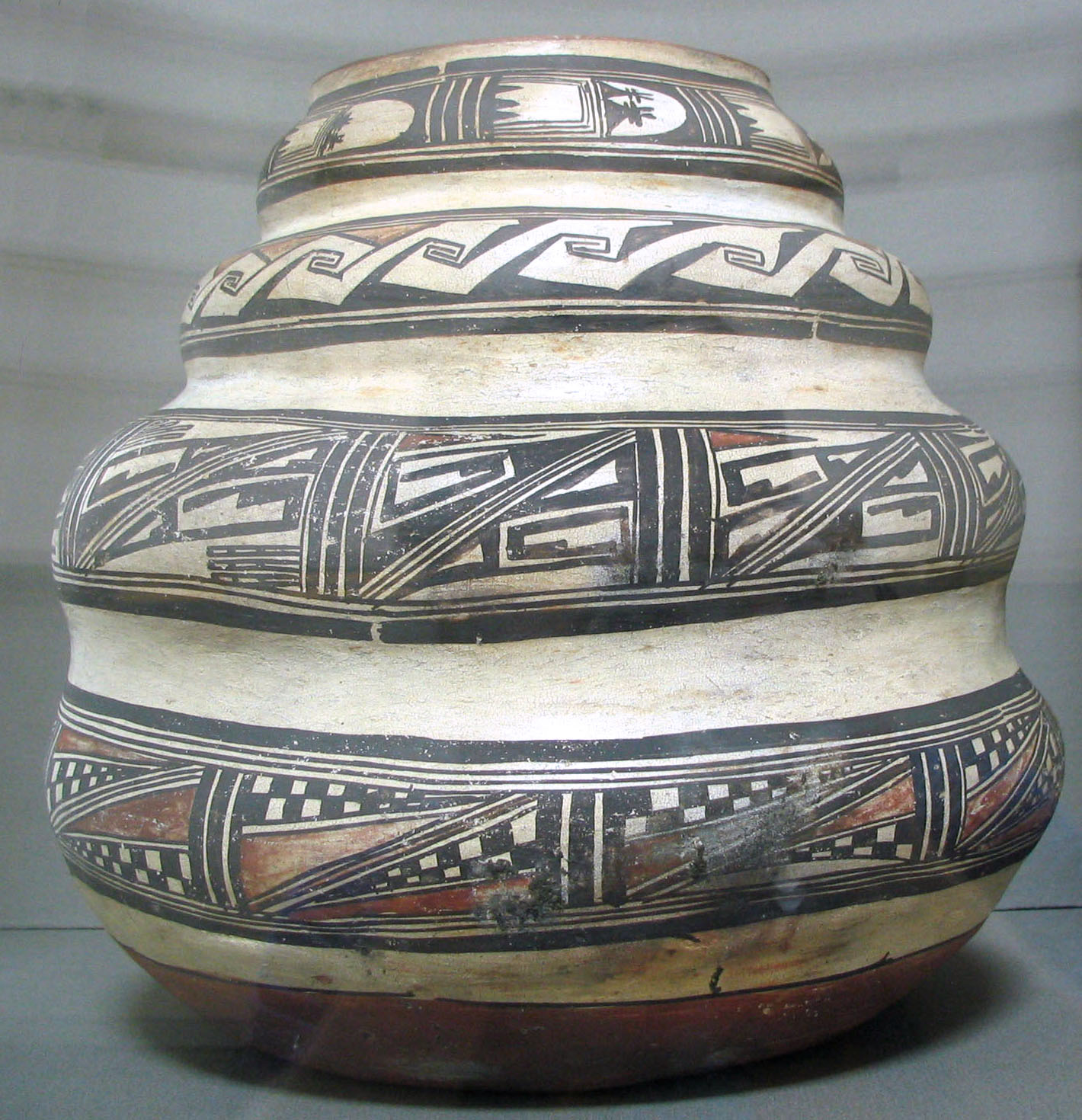
A Hopi jar by Nampeyo (c.1860–1942), made in Arizona, 1880.

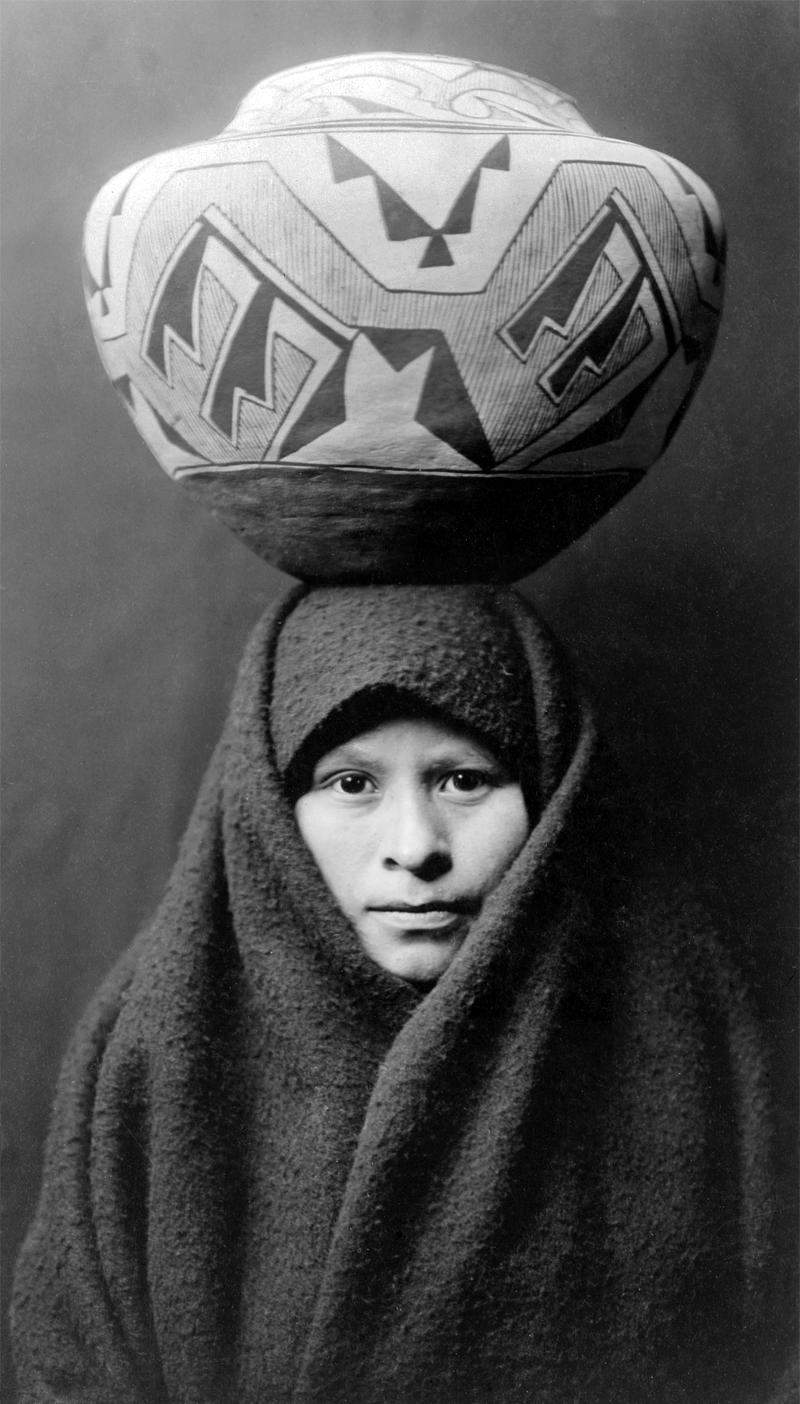
A girl from the Zuni tribe of New Mexico with a painted pottery jar, photographed in c. 1903.

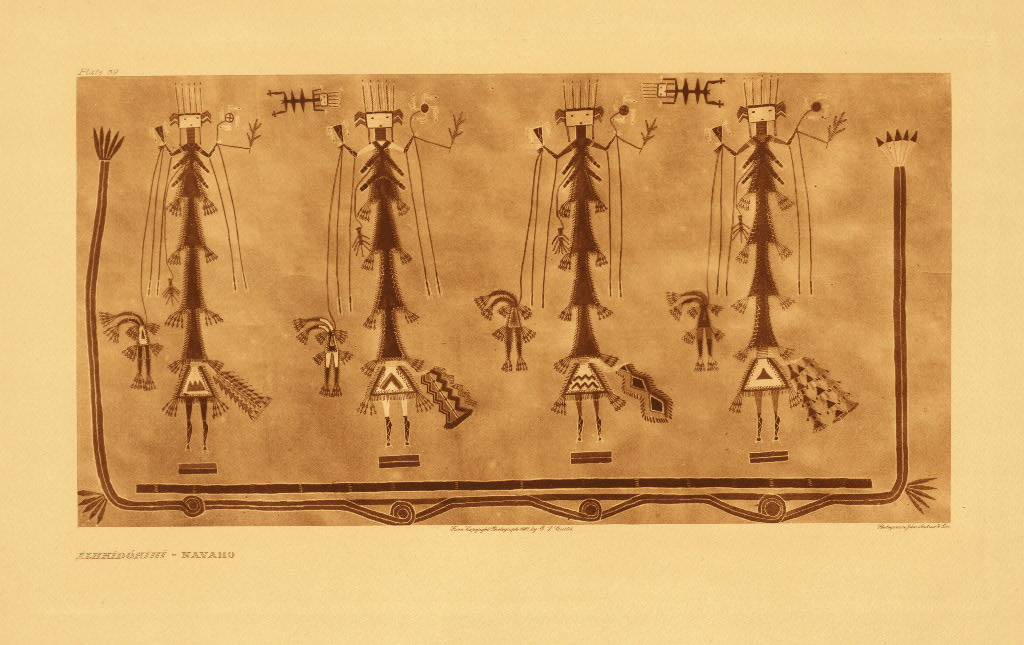
Edward S. Curtis, Navajo sandpainting, sepia photogravure c. 1907

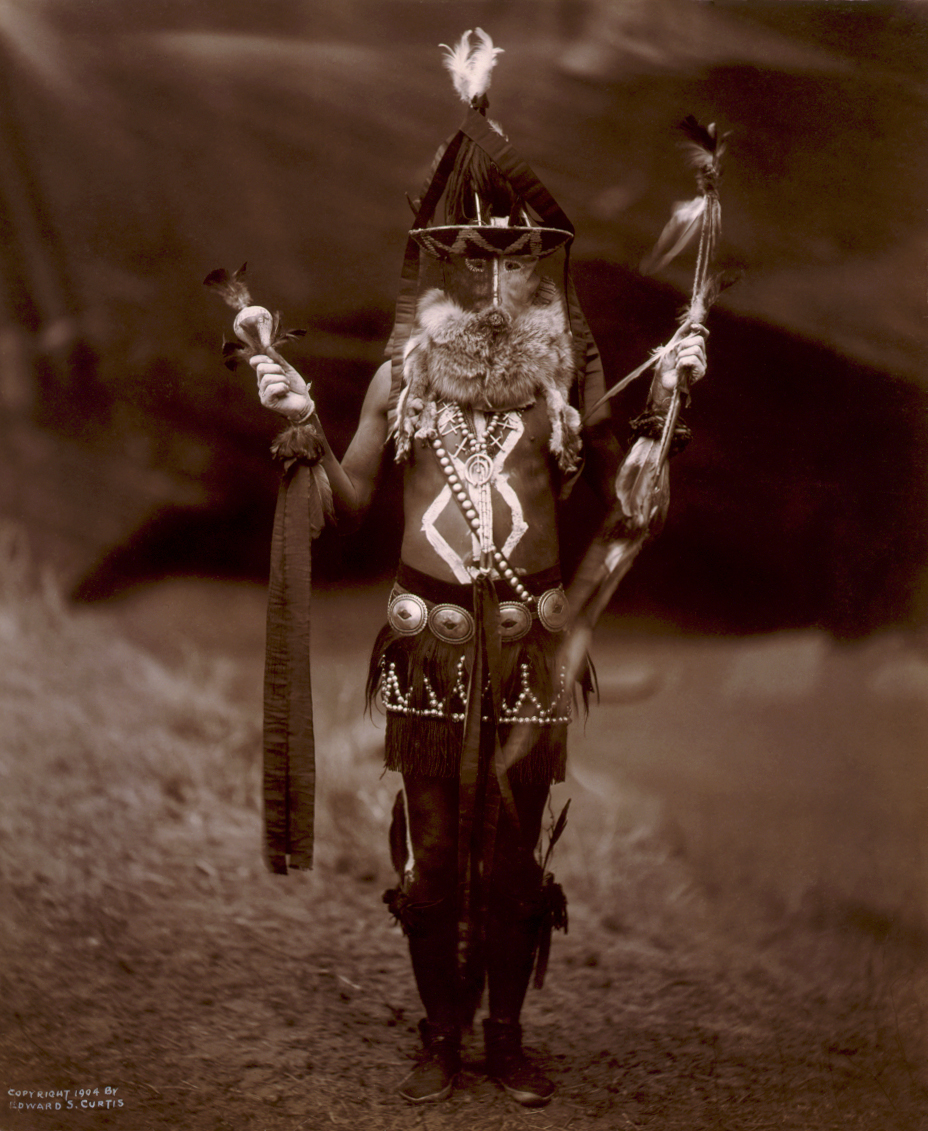
Navajo man in ceremonial dress with mask and body paint, c. 1904

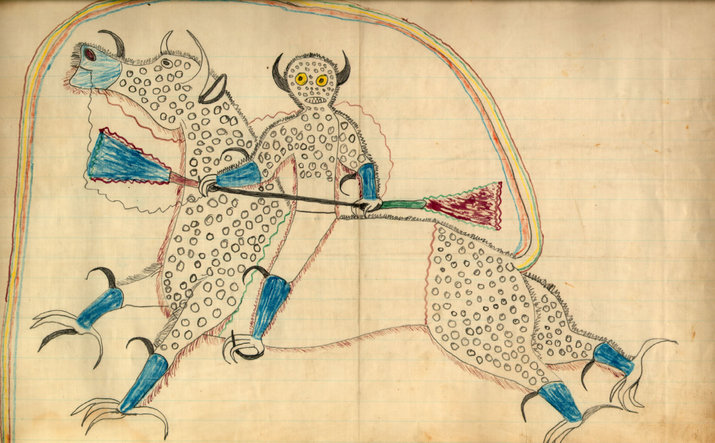
Ledger art of Haokah (ca. 1880) by Black Hawk (Lakota).

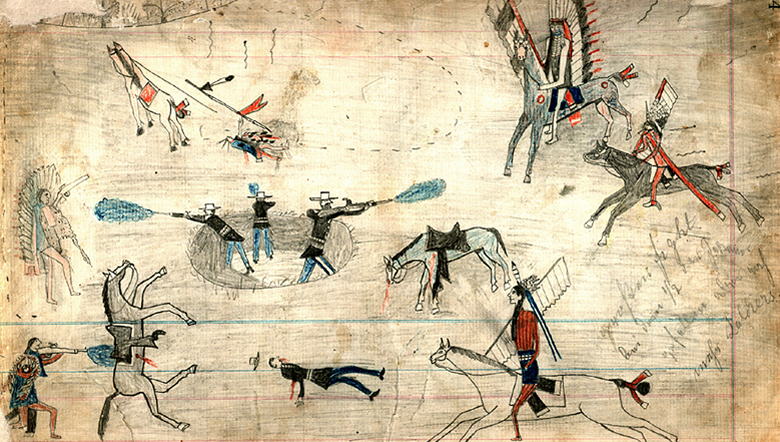
Kiowa ledger art, possibly of the 1874 Buffalo Wallow battle, Red River War.

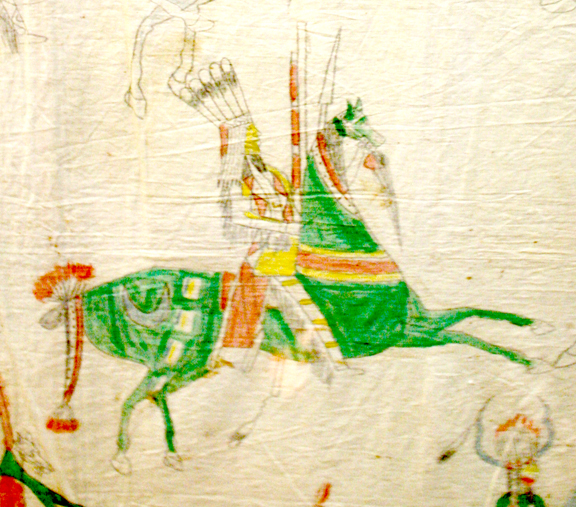
Detail of ledger painting on muslin by Silver Horn (1860–1940), ca. 1880, Oklahoma History Center

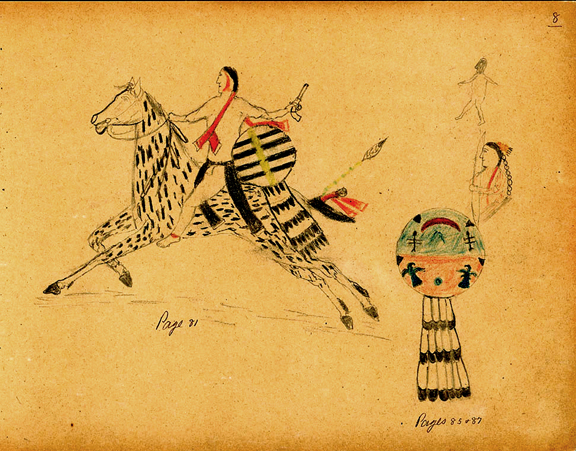
Work on Paper, by Arapaho painter, Carl Sweezy (1881–1953), 1904

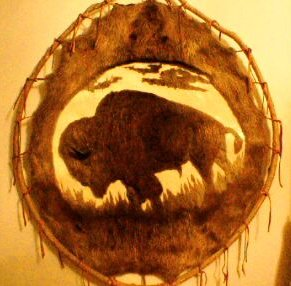
An Uncompaghre Ute, Shaved Beaver Hide Painting. The Northern Ute would trap beavers, shave images into the animals' stretched and cured hides, and use them to decorate their personal and ceremonial dwellings, c. 19th century.

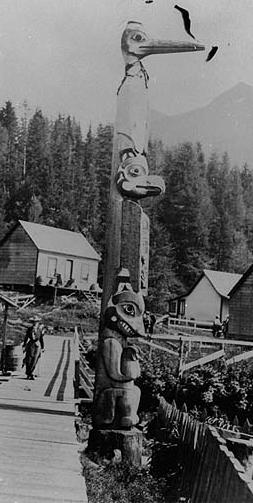
Tlingit totem pole in Ketchikan, Alaska, circa 1901.

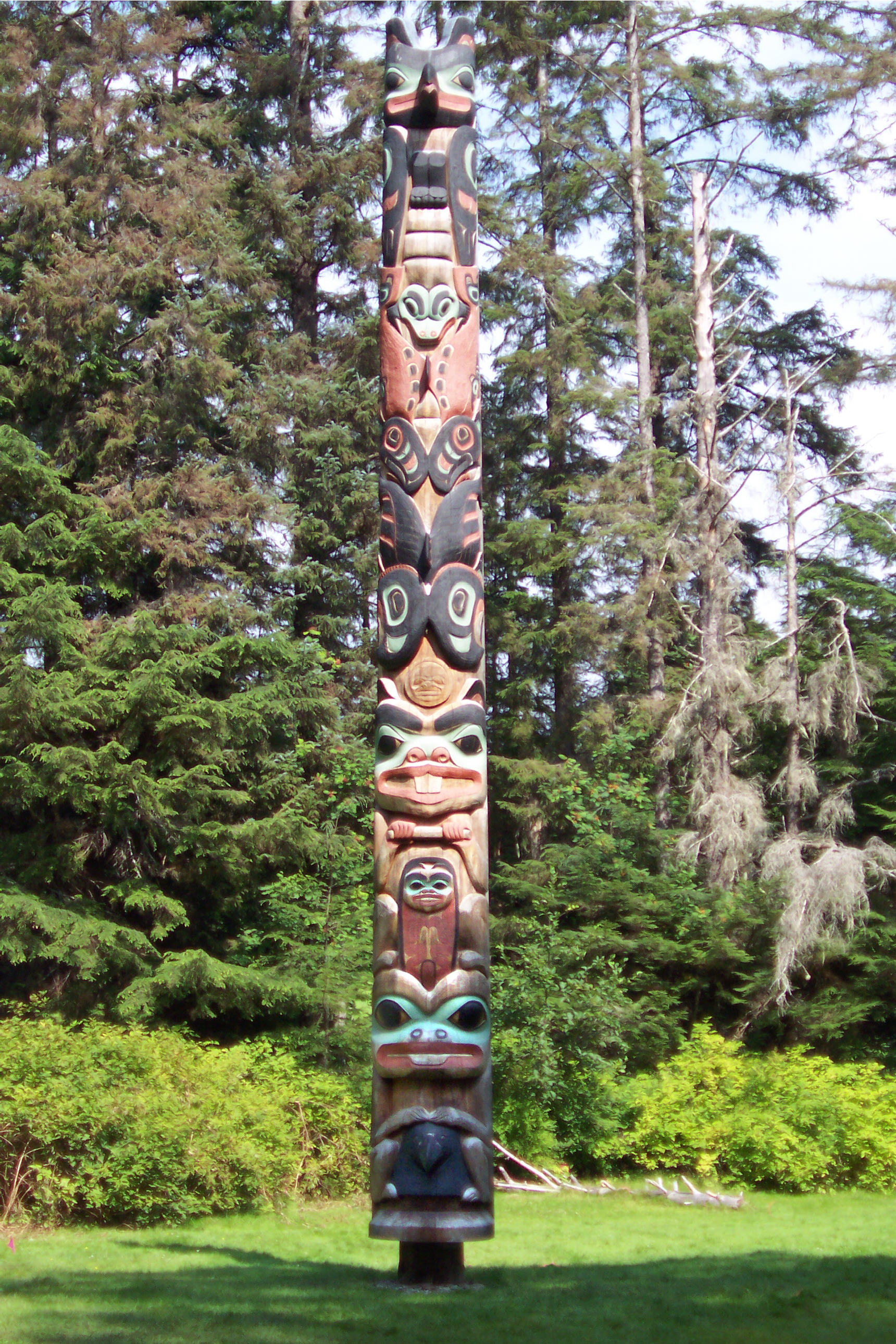
The K'alyaan Totem Pole of the Tlingit Kiks.ádi Clan, erected at Sitka National Historical Park to commemorate the lives lost in the 1804 Battle of Sitka.

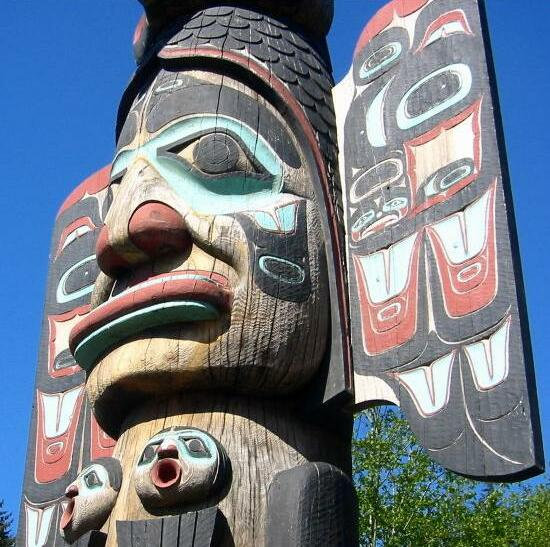
The Chief Johnson totem pole in Ketchikan, Alaska, in the Tlingit style.

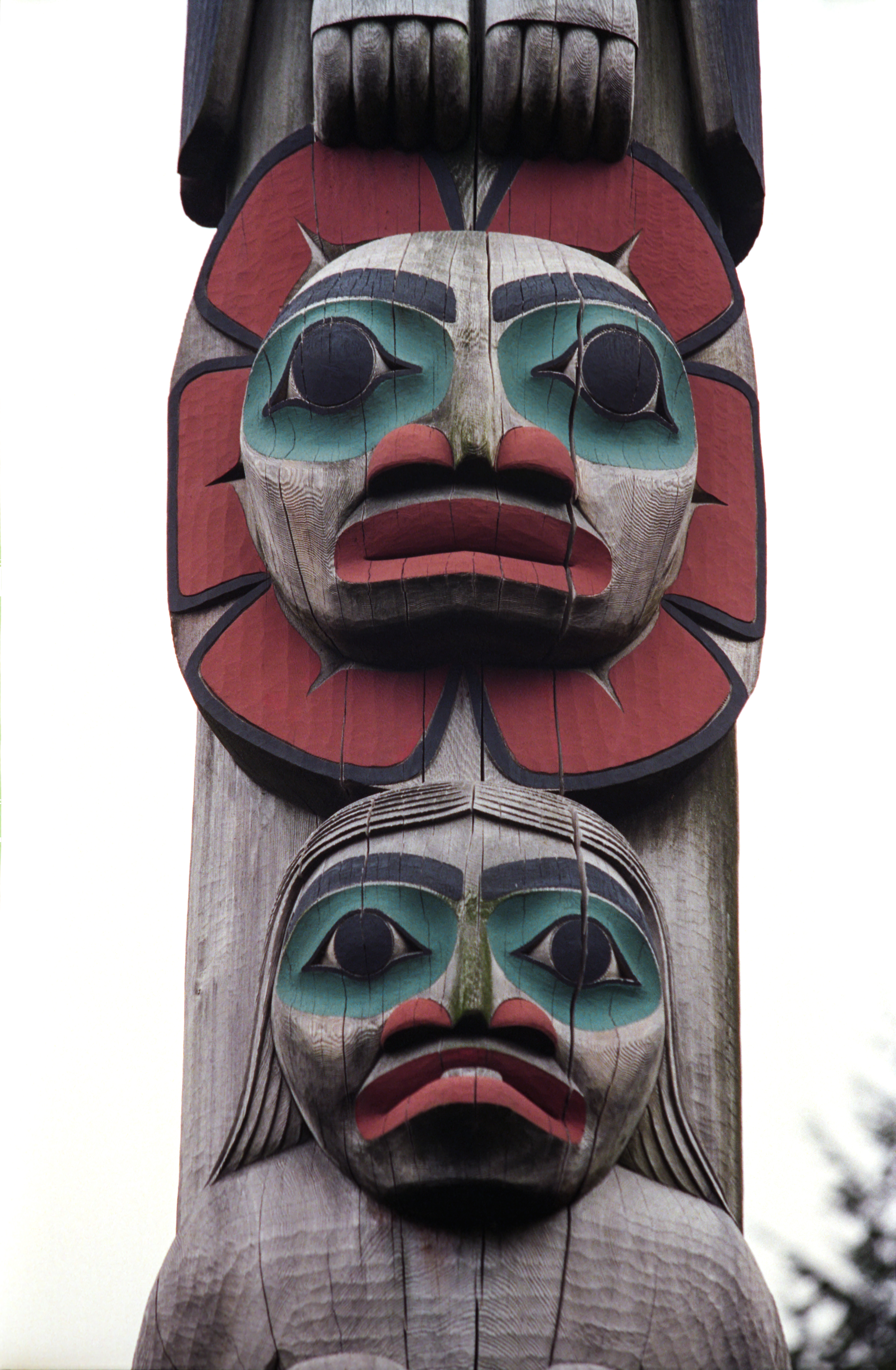
Detail on Raven Stealing the Sun totem pole, Ketchikan, Alaska

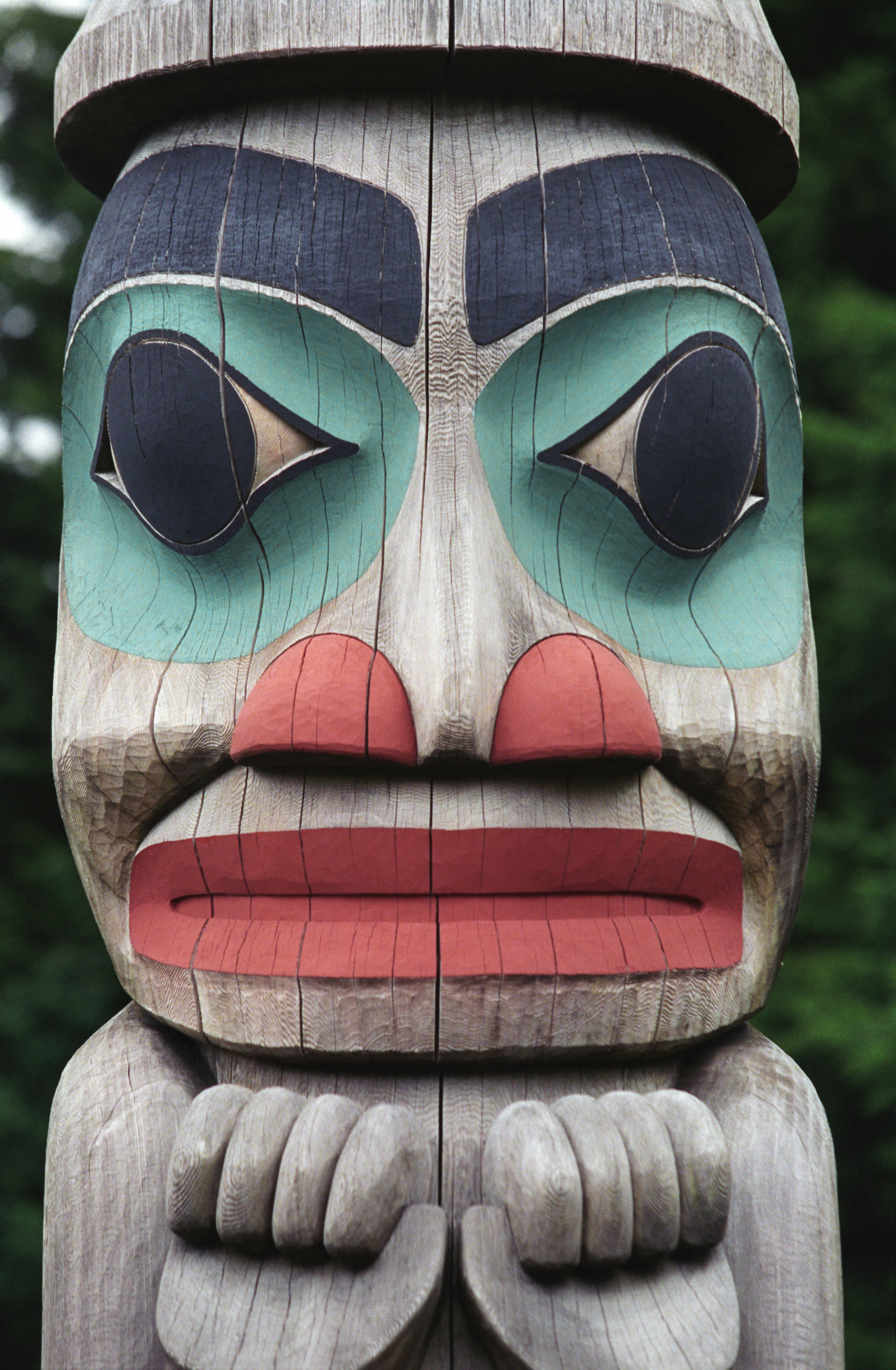
Detail on Raven Stealing the Sun totem pole, Ketchikan, Alaska

==== Canada ====
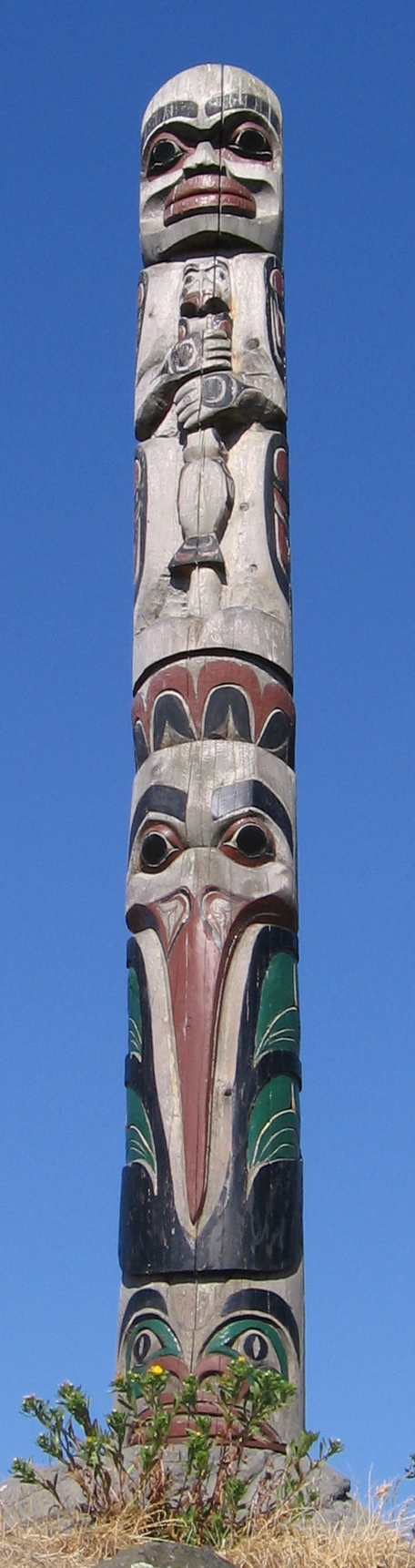
A totem pole in Totem Park, Victoria, British Columbia.

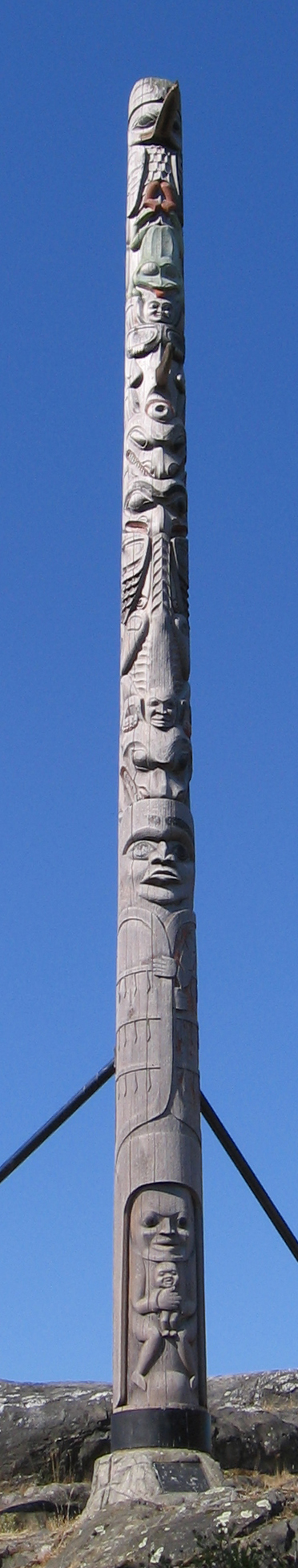
From Totem Park, Victoria, British Columbia.

=== Caribbean ===
Rock petroglyph overlaid with chalk, Caguana Indigenous Ceremonial Center. Utuado, Puerto Rico.

== Islamic ==
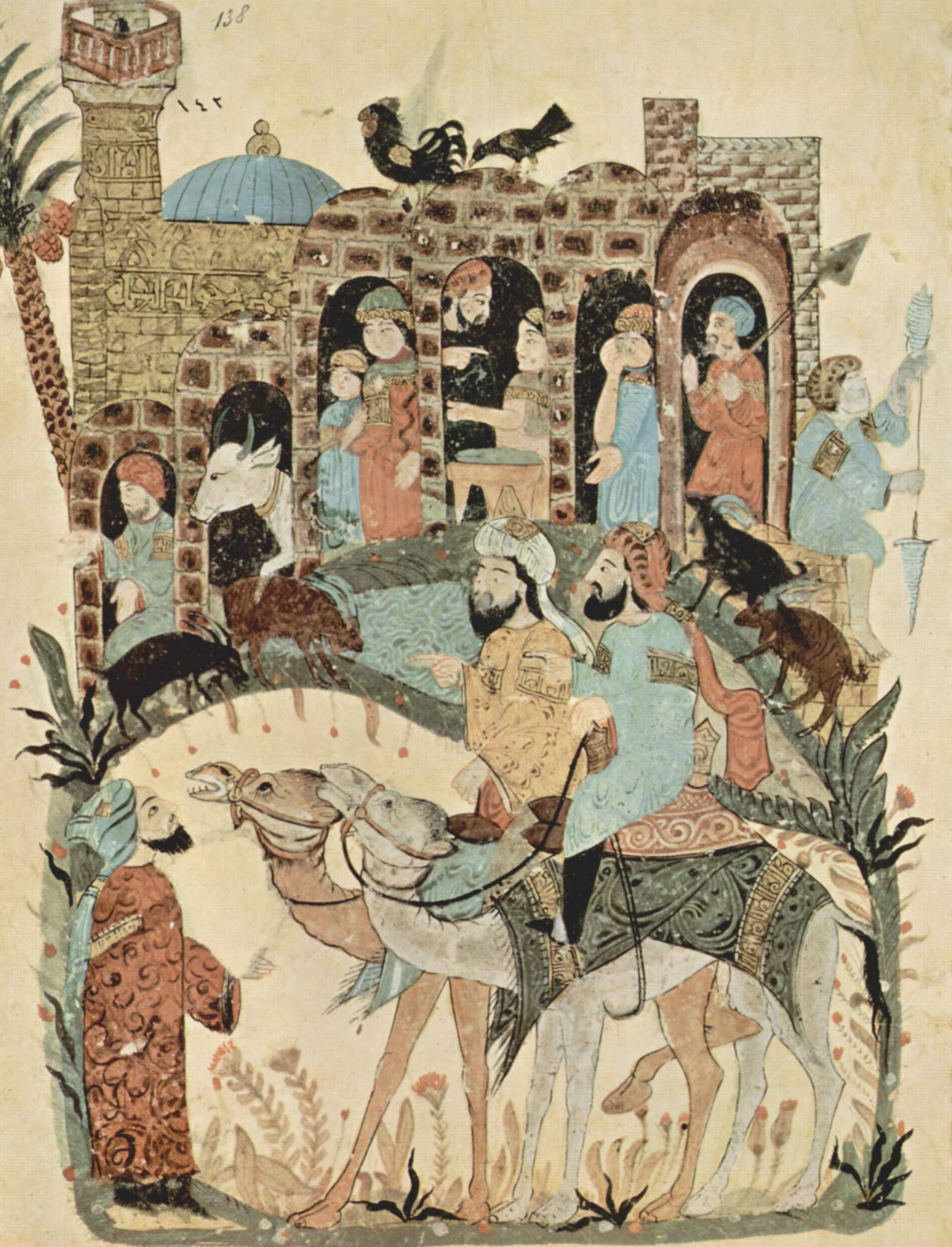
Yahyâ ibn Mahmûd al-Wâsitî, Iraq, 1237

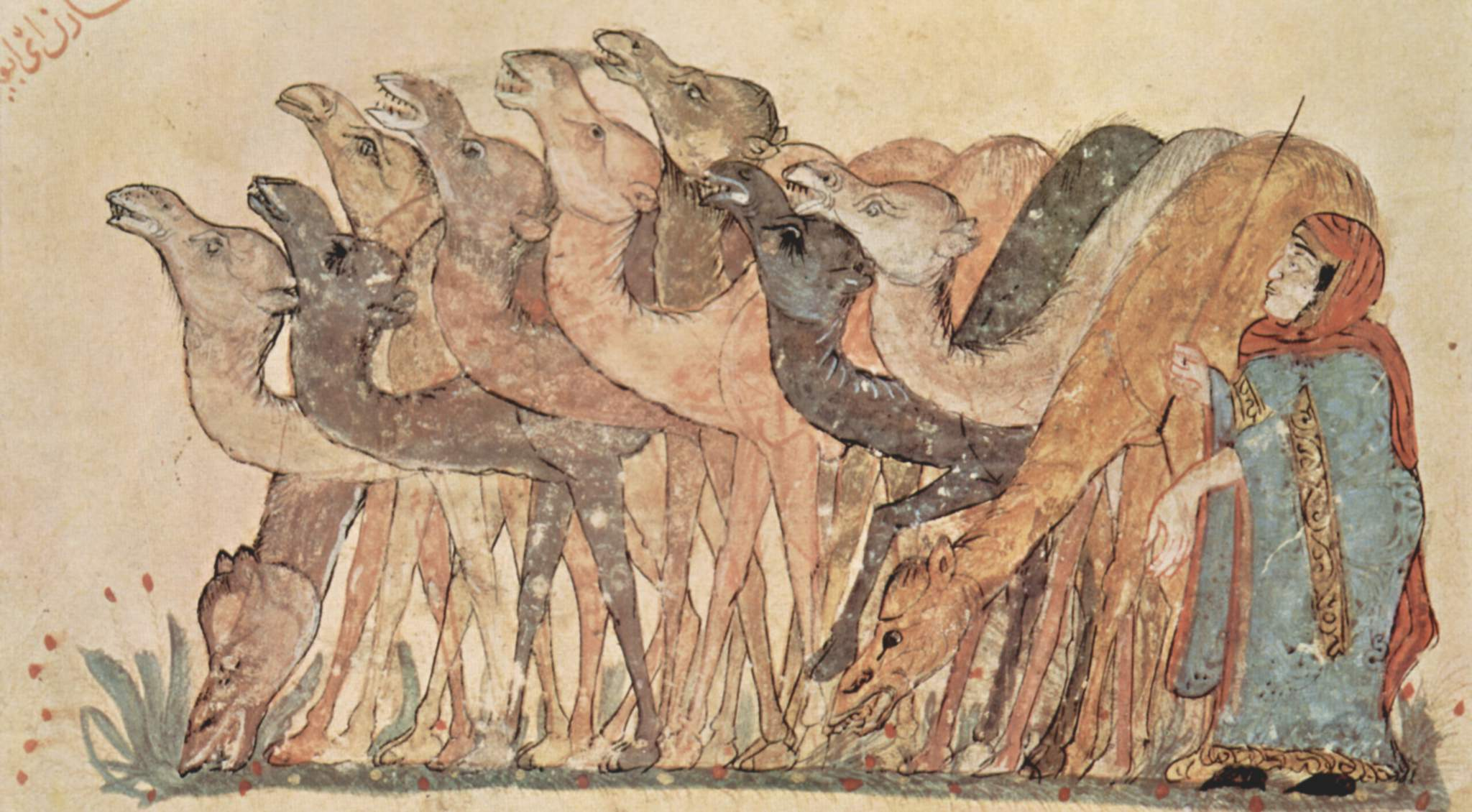
Yahyâ ibn Mahmûd al-Wâsitî, Iraq, 1237

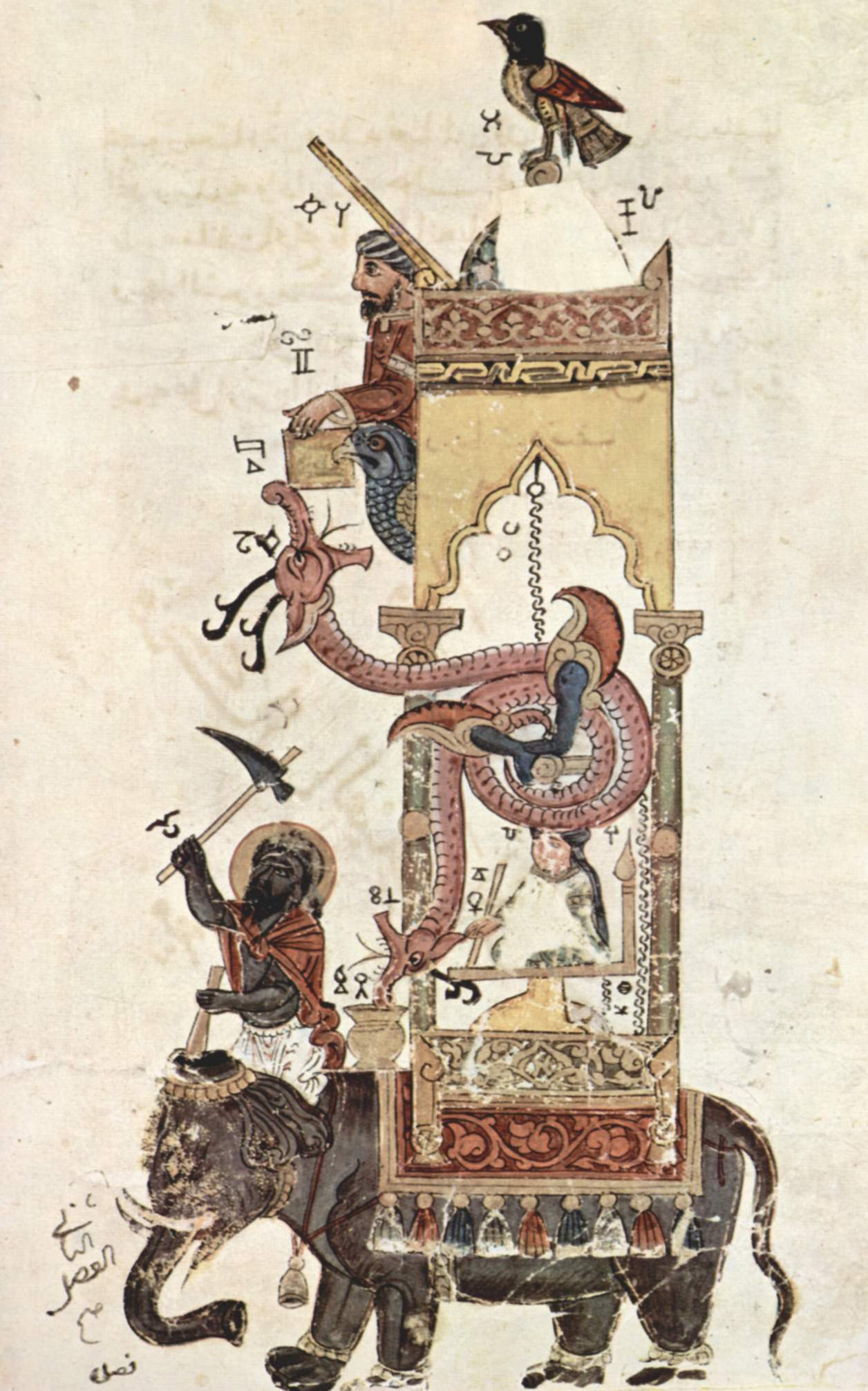
Syrian painter, 1315 Metropolitan Museum of Art

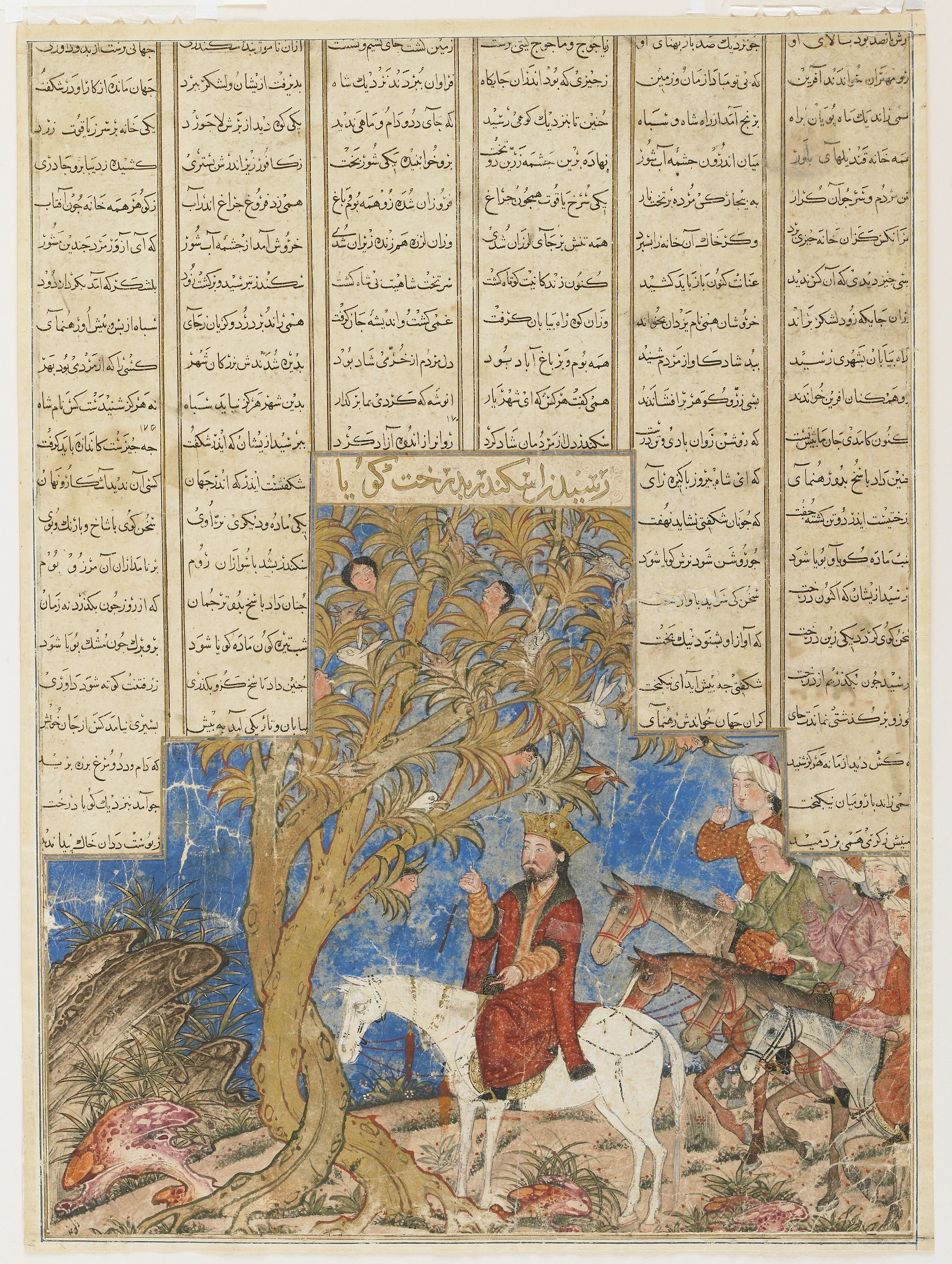
Ilkhanid Shahnameh, ca. 1330–1340, Smithsonian

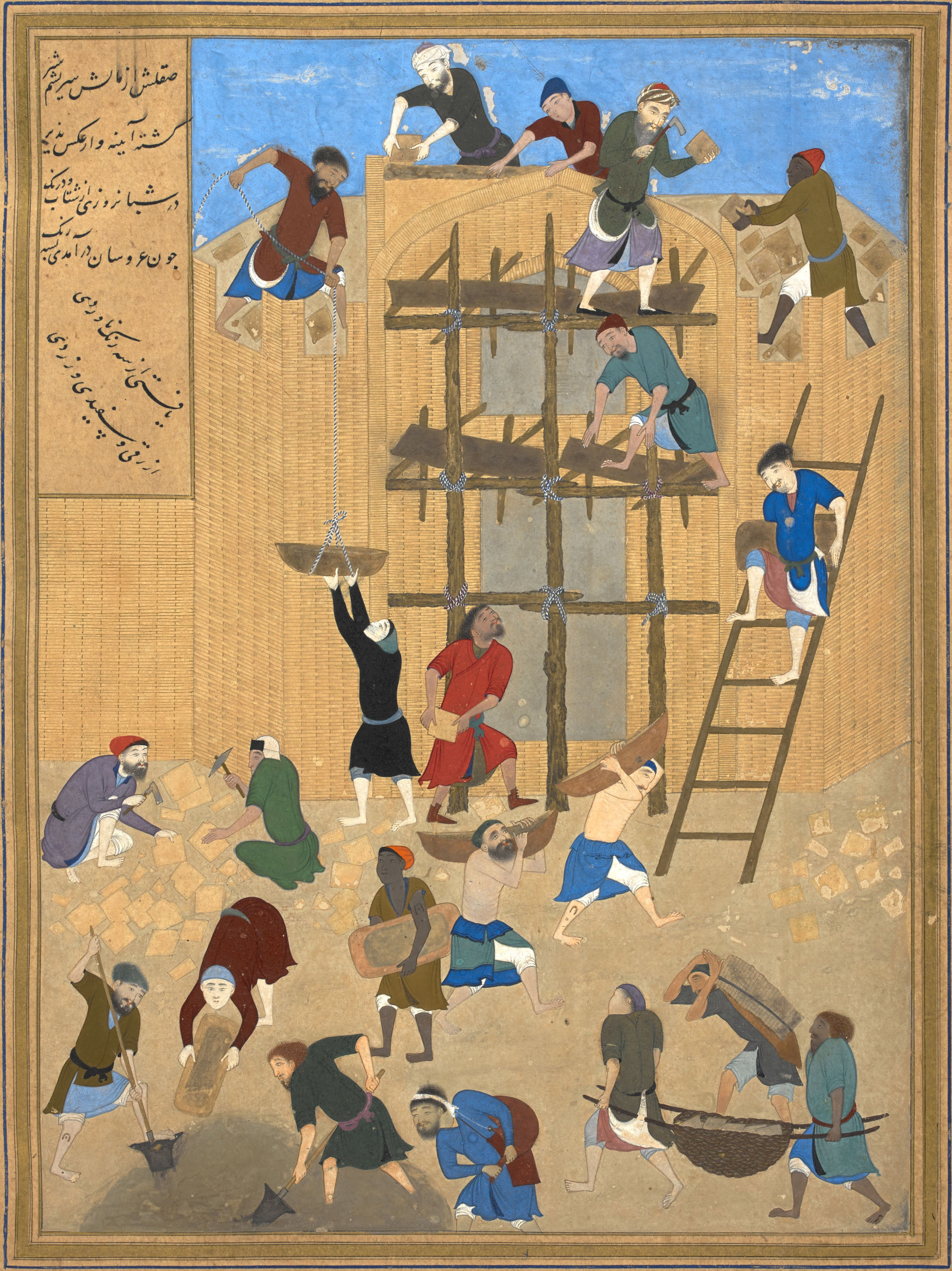
Kamal-ud-din Bihzad (c. 1450 – c. 1535), The construction of castle Khavarnaq (الخورنق) in al-Hira, c. 1494–1495 C.E. British Museum

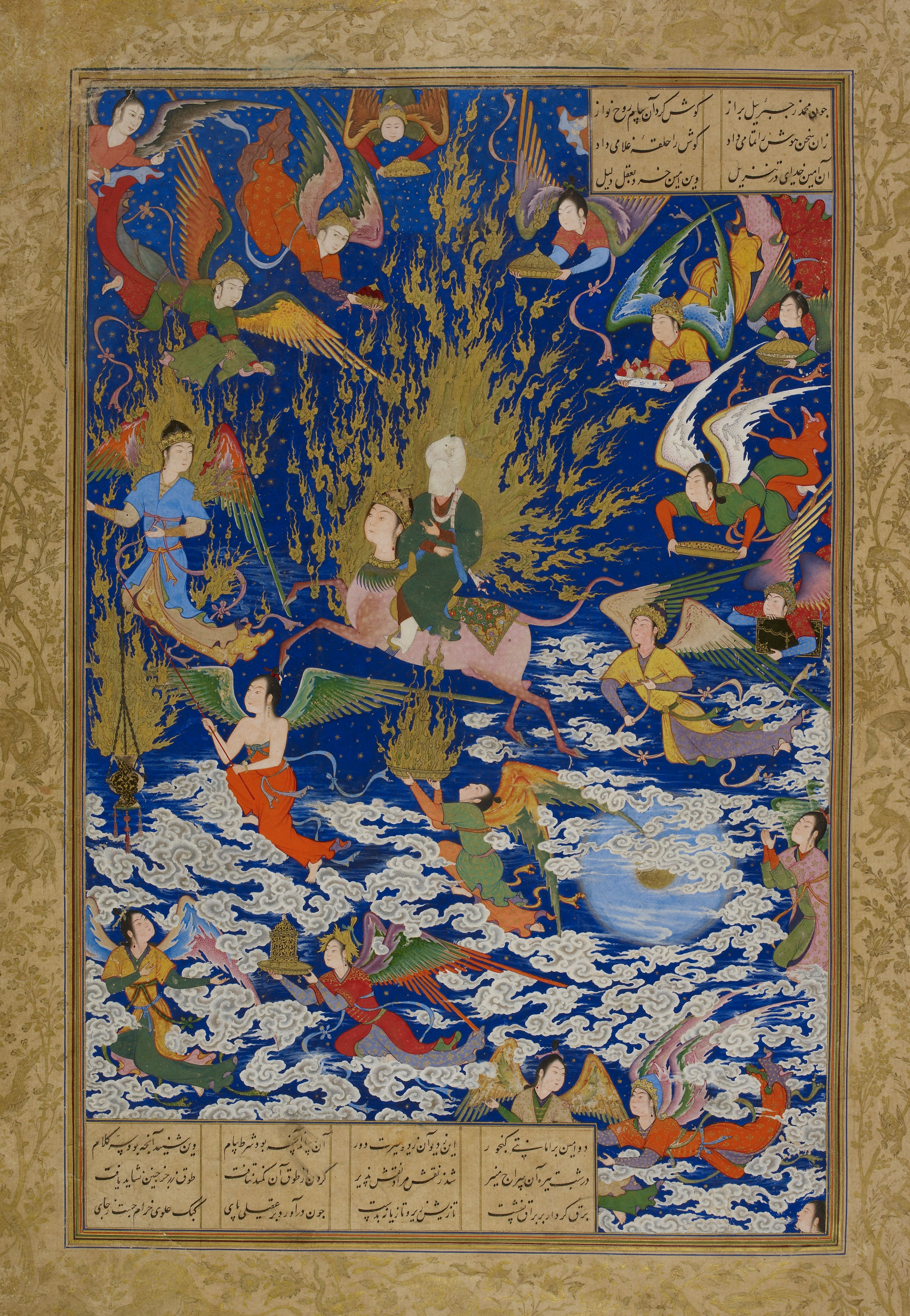
Persian miniature painting, CE 1550

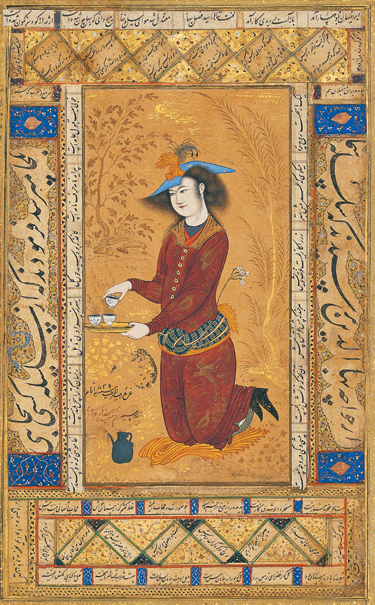
Reza Abbasi, 1609

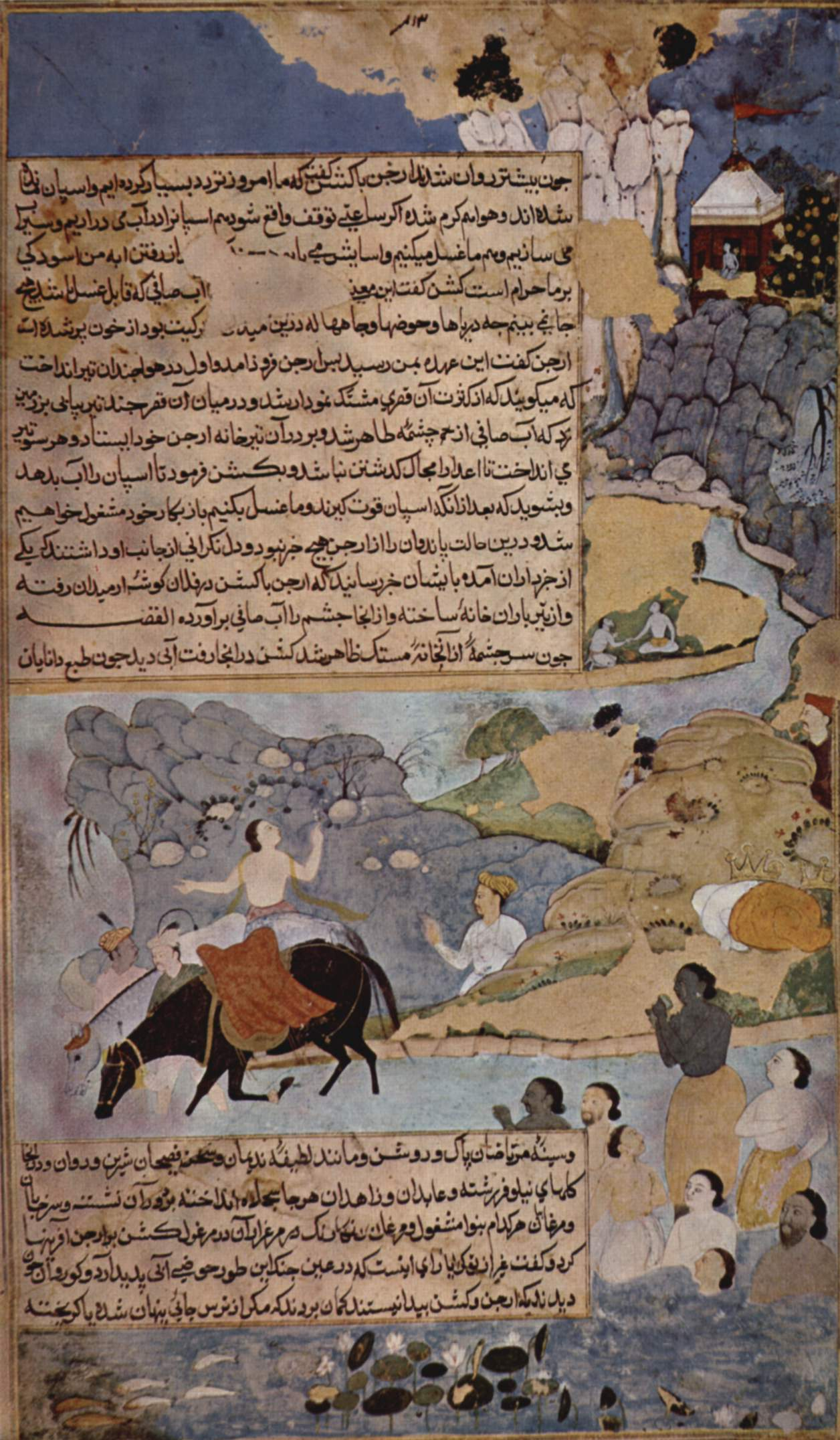
Razmnama, 1616, British Museum

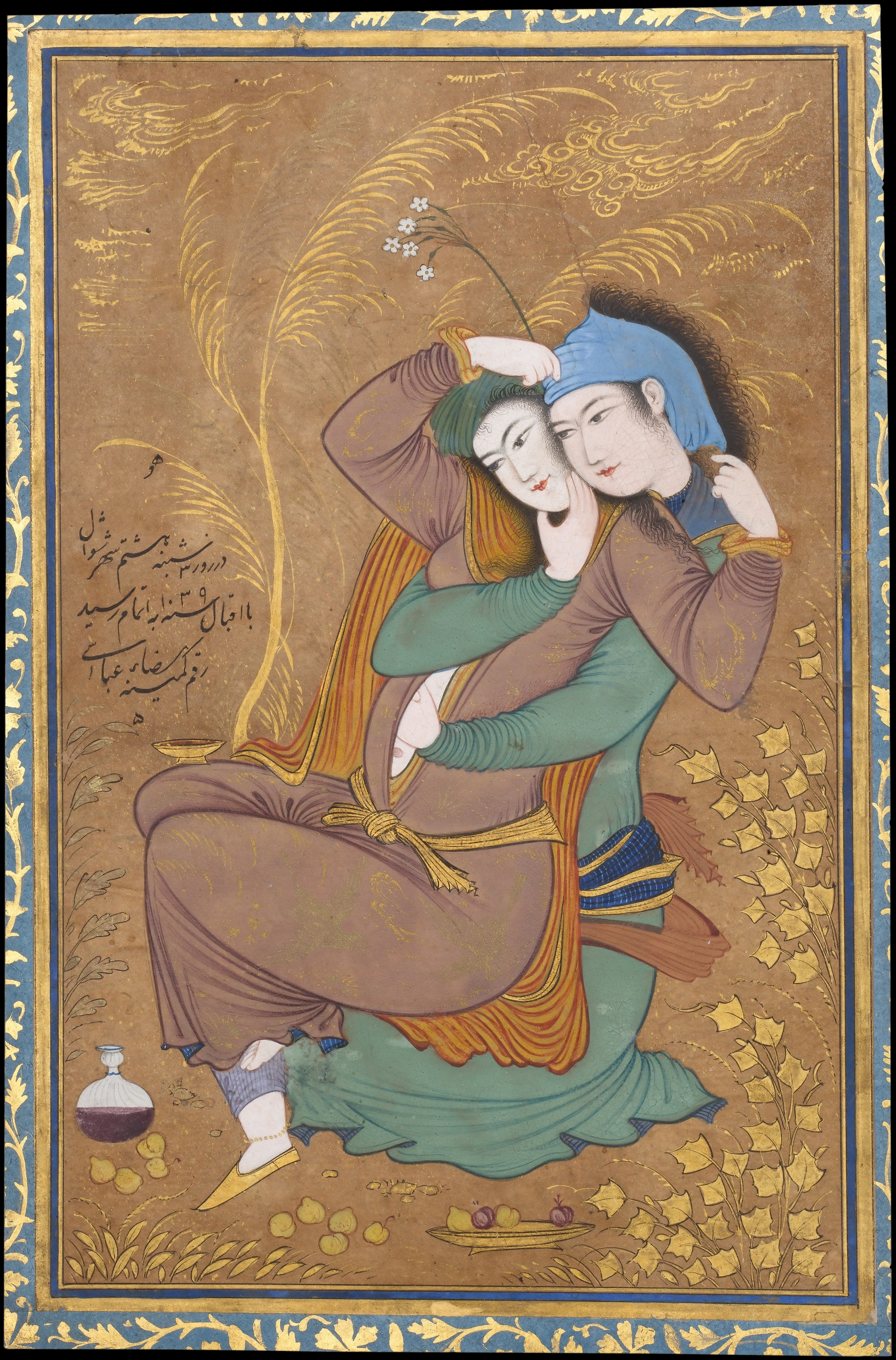
Two Lovers by Reza Abbasi, 1630

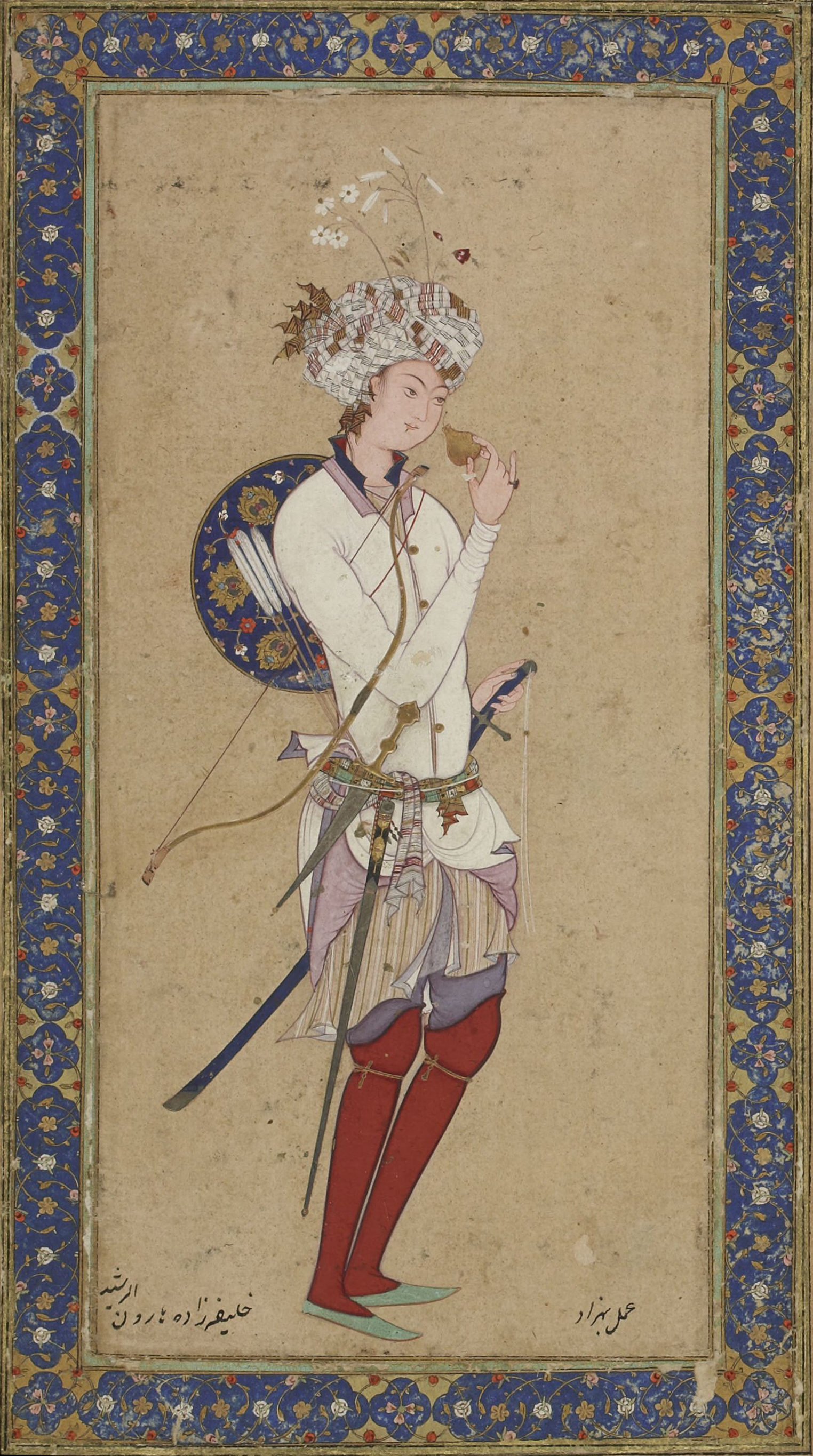
Persian miniature Harun al-Rashid in Thousand and One Nights

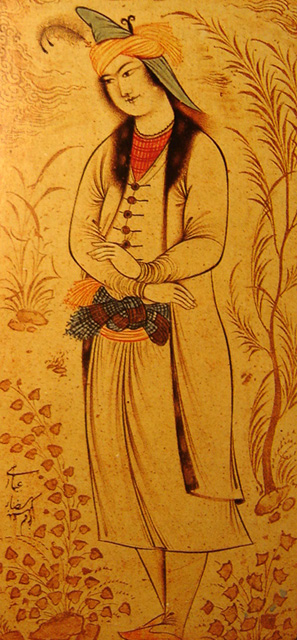
Reza Abbasi (1565–1635), Prince Muhammad-Beik of Georgia, 1620

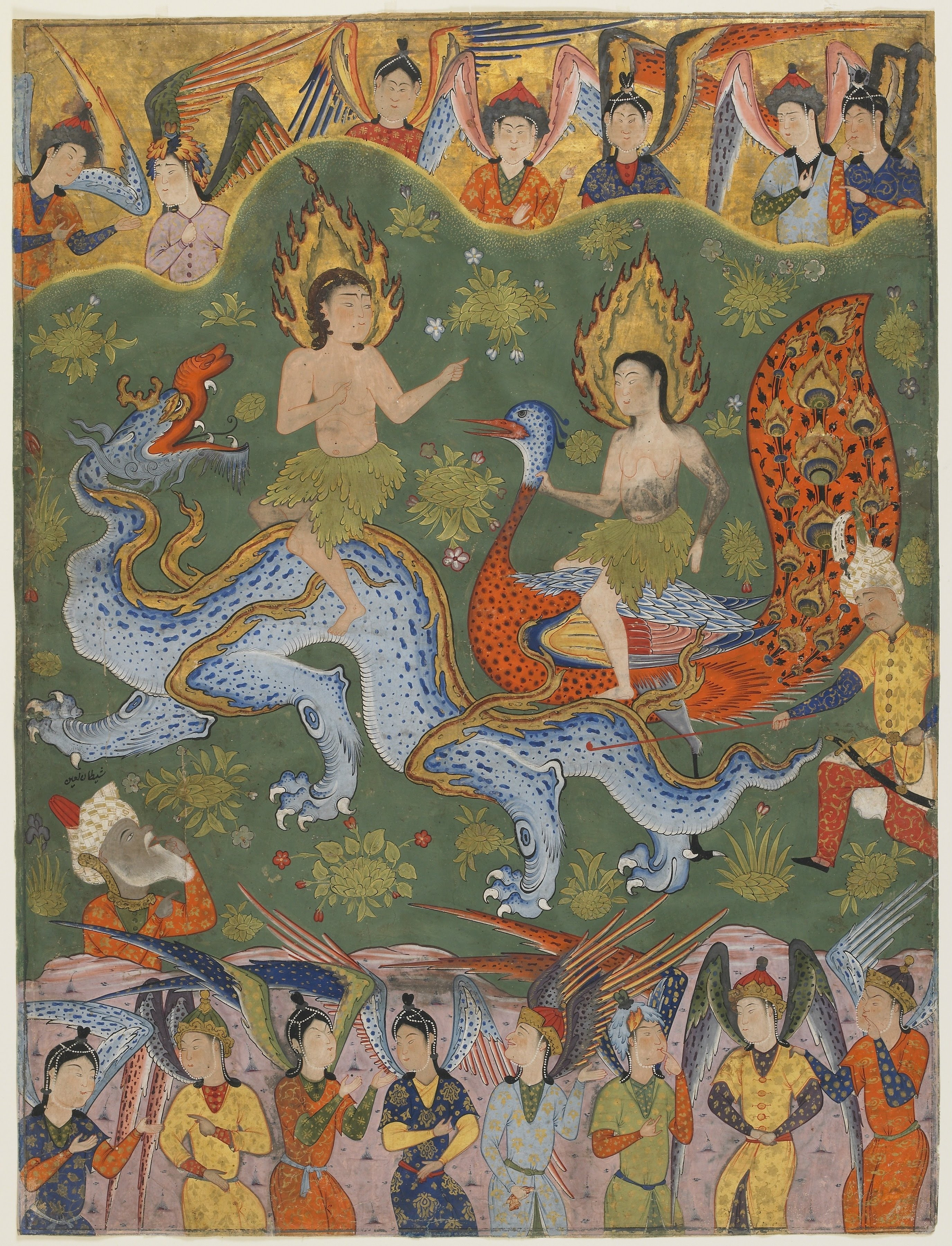
Adam and Eve, Safavid Iran, from a Falnama (book of Omens) c. 1550 AD.

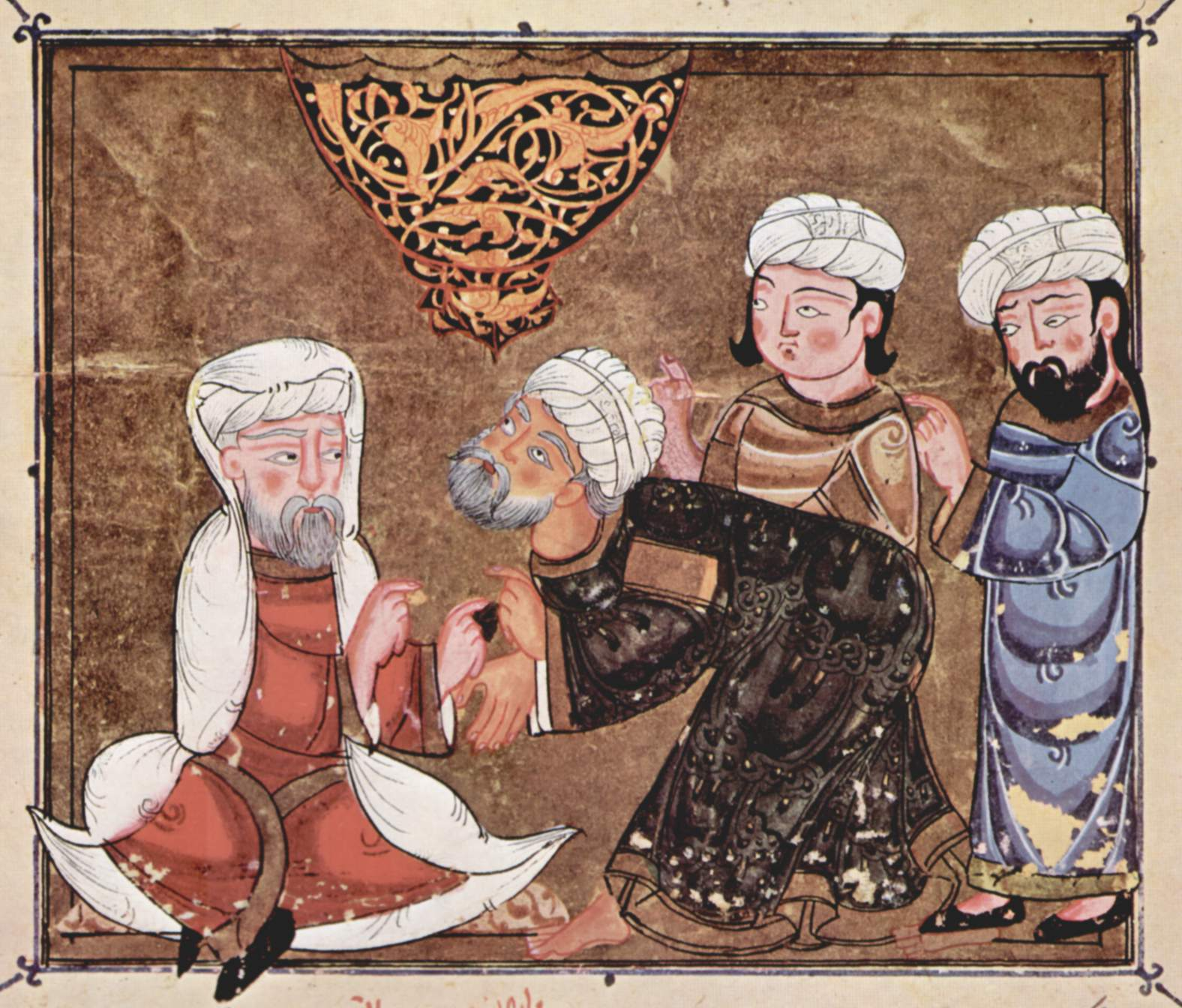
A painting depicting Abû Zayd, 1335 AD.

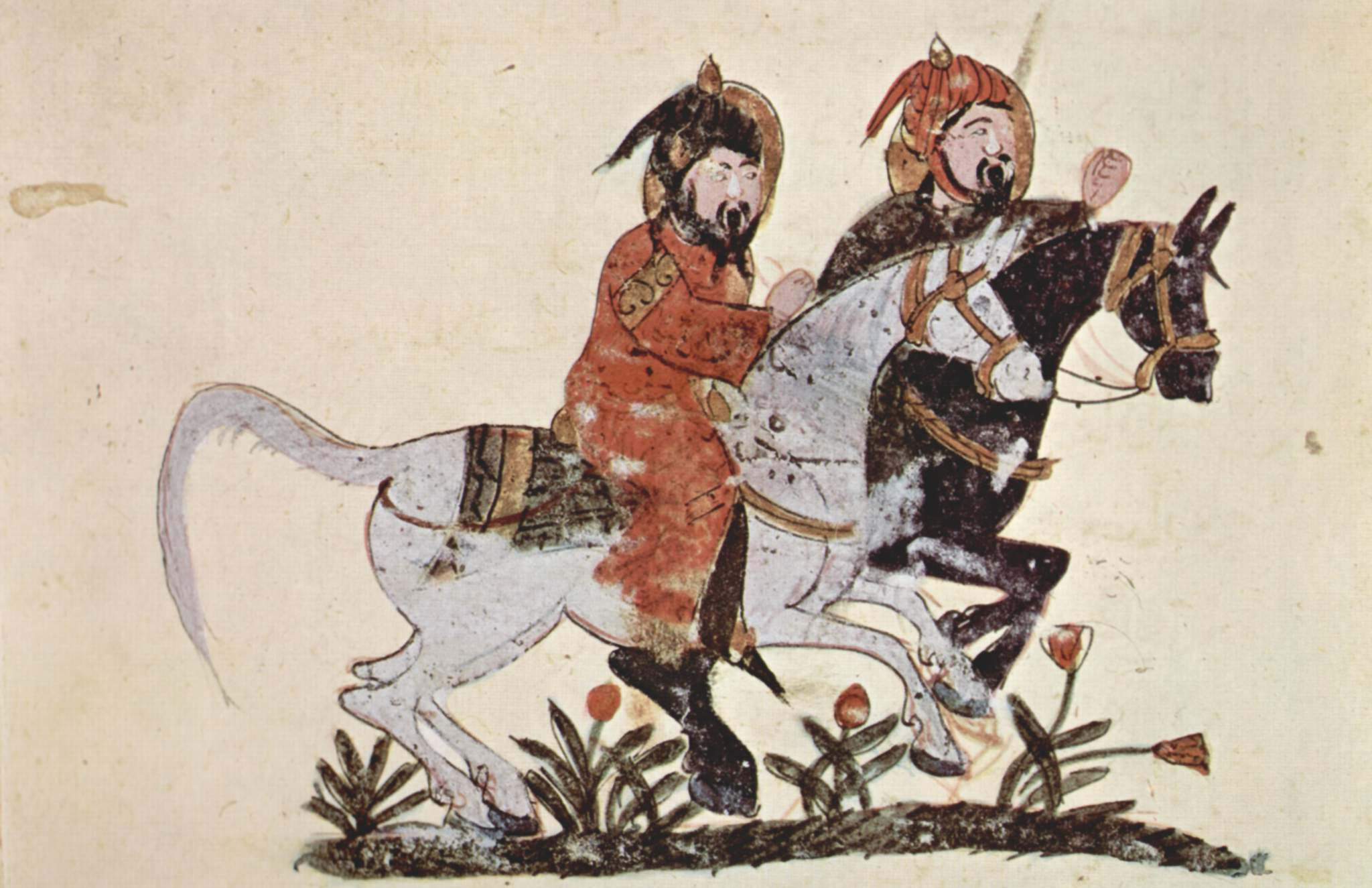
A scene from the book of Ahmad ibn al-Husayn ibn al-Ahnaf, showing two galloping horsemen, 1210 AD.

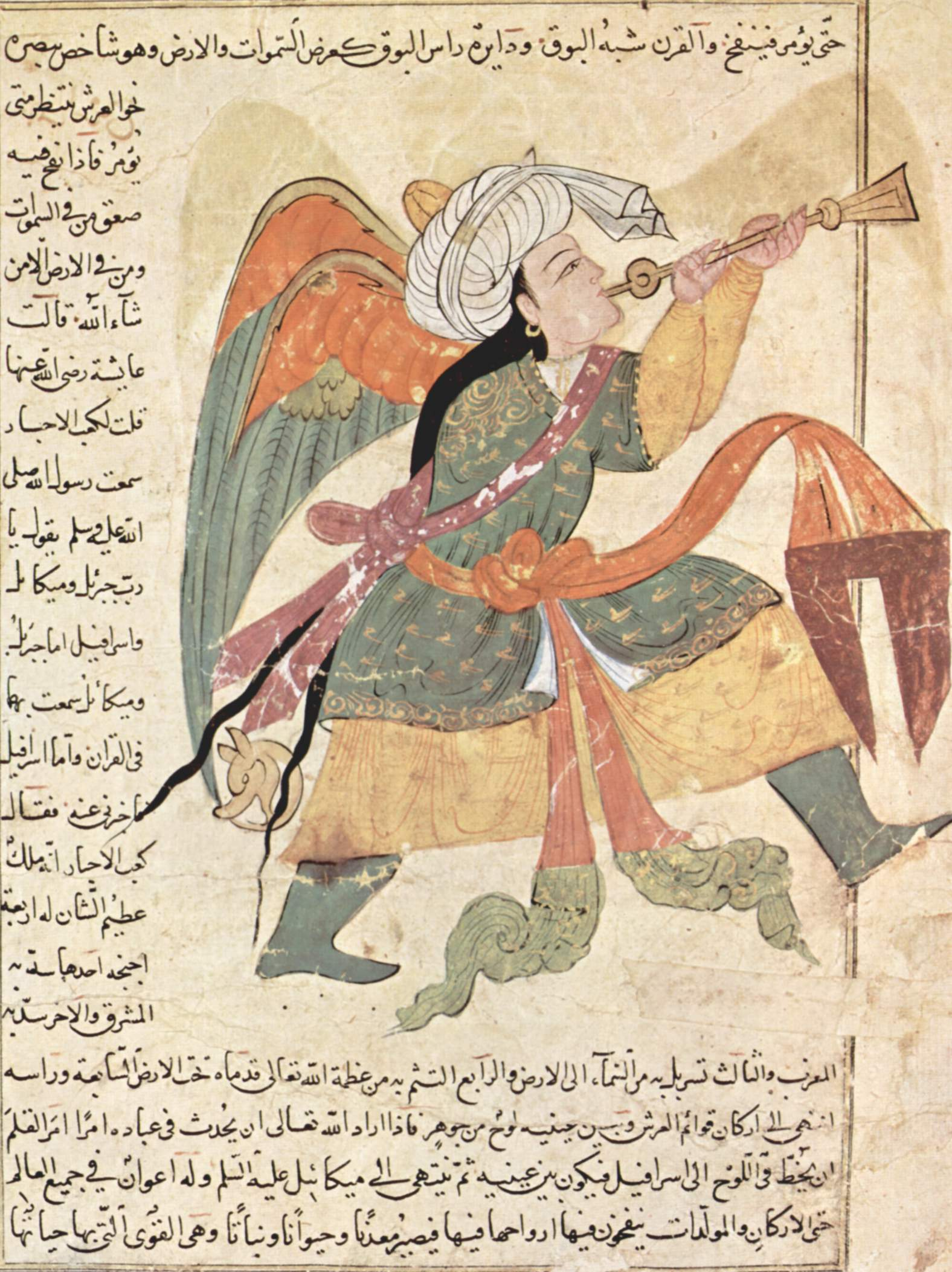
The angel Isrâfîl, Iraq, 1280 AD.

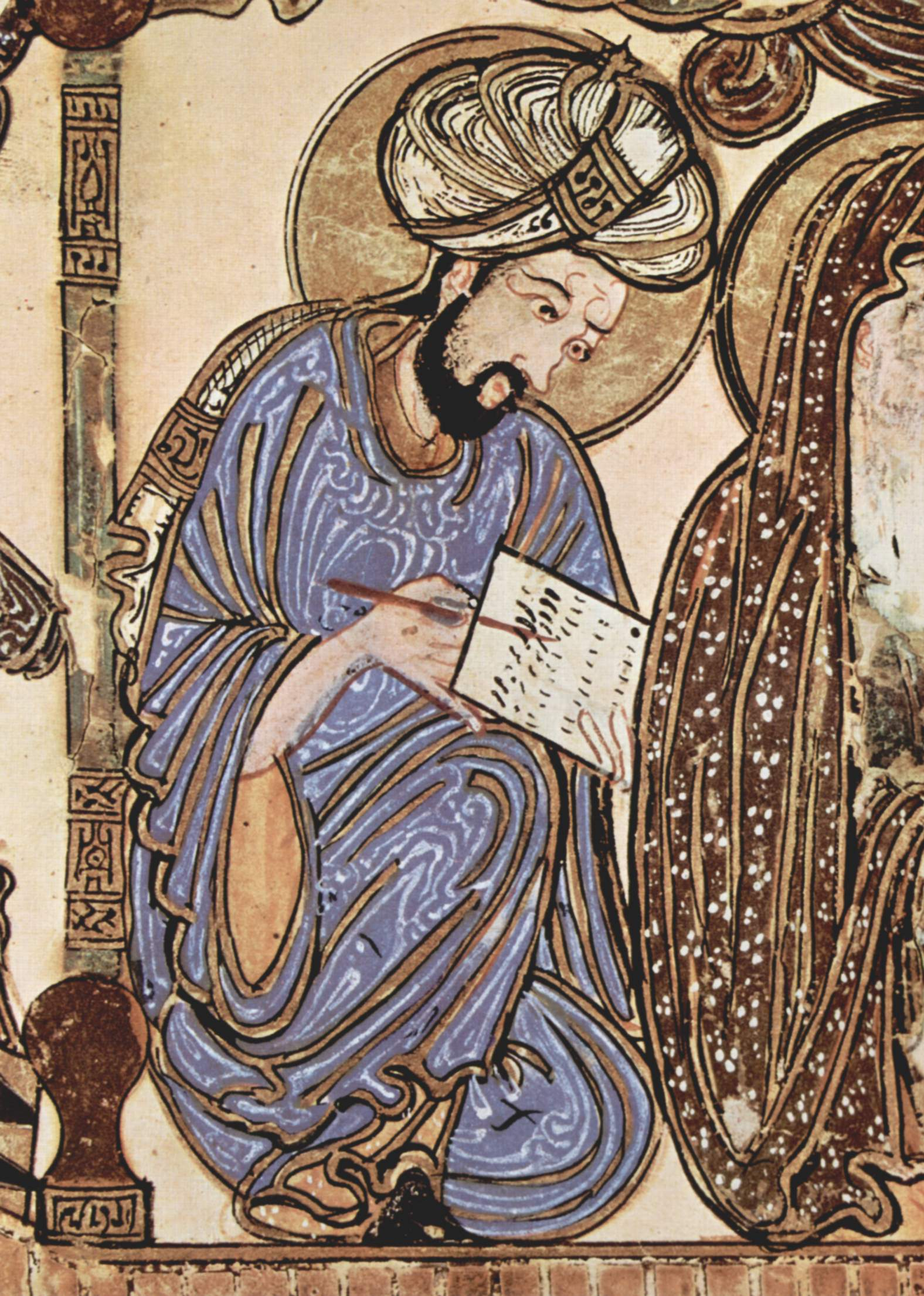
The Clerk, Iraq, 1287.

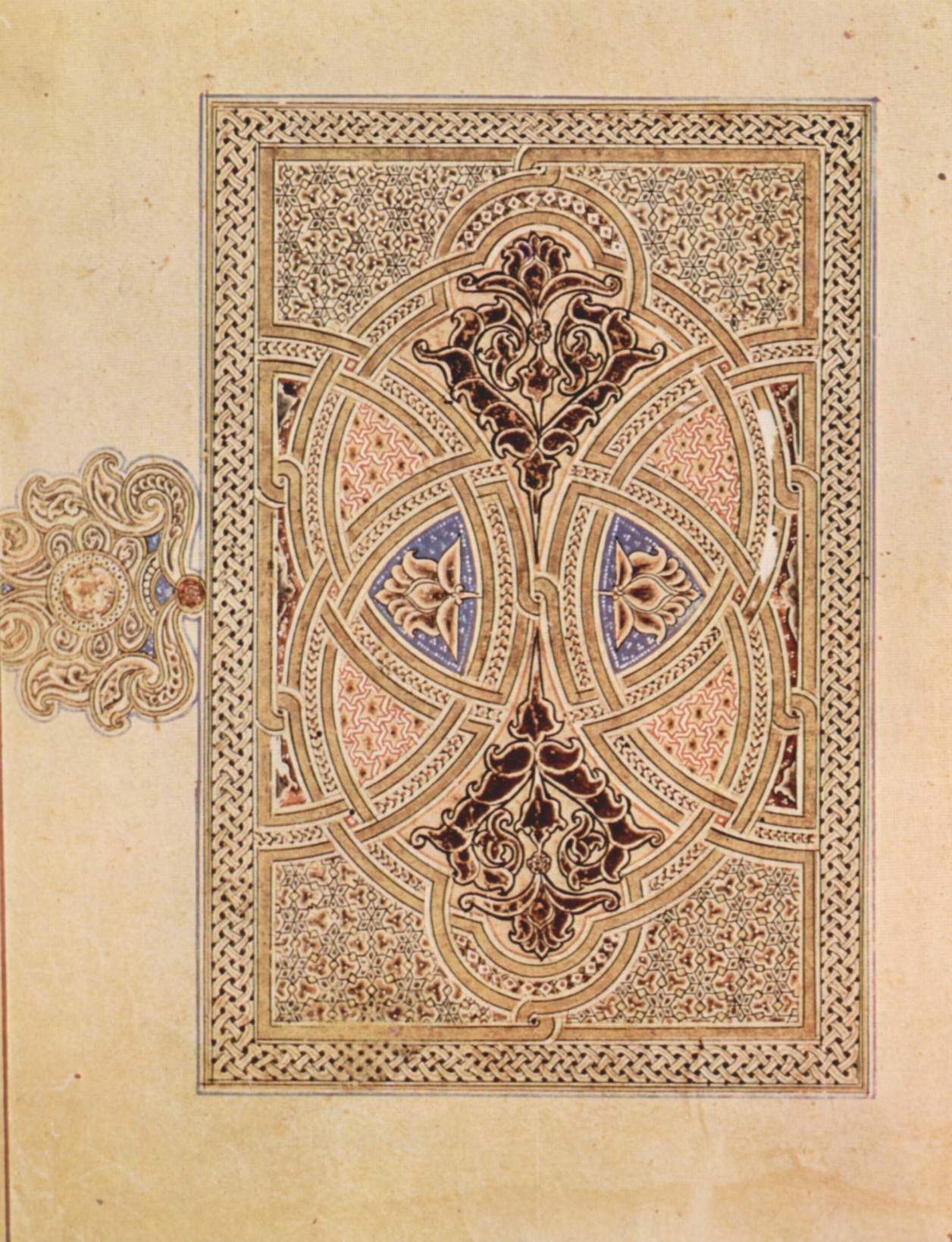
An ornamental Qur'an, by al-Bawwâb, 11th century AD.

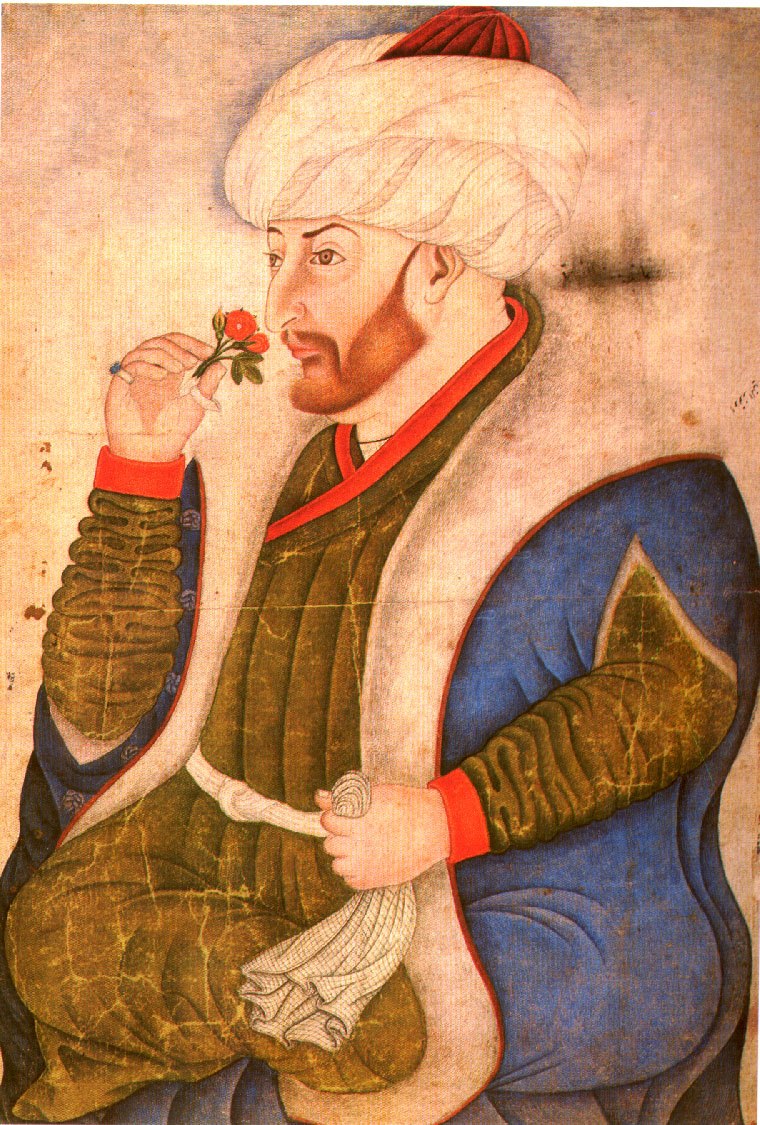
Mehmet II, from the Sarai Albums of Istanbul, Turkey, 15th century AD

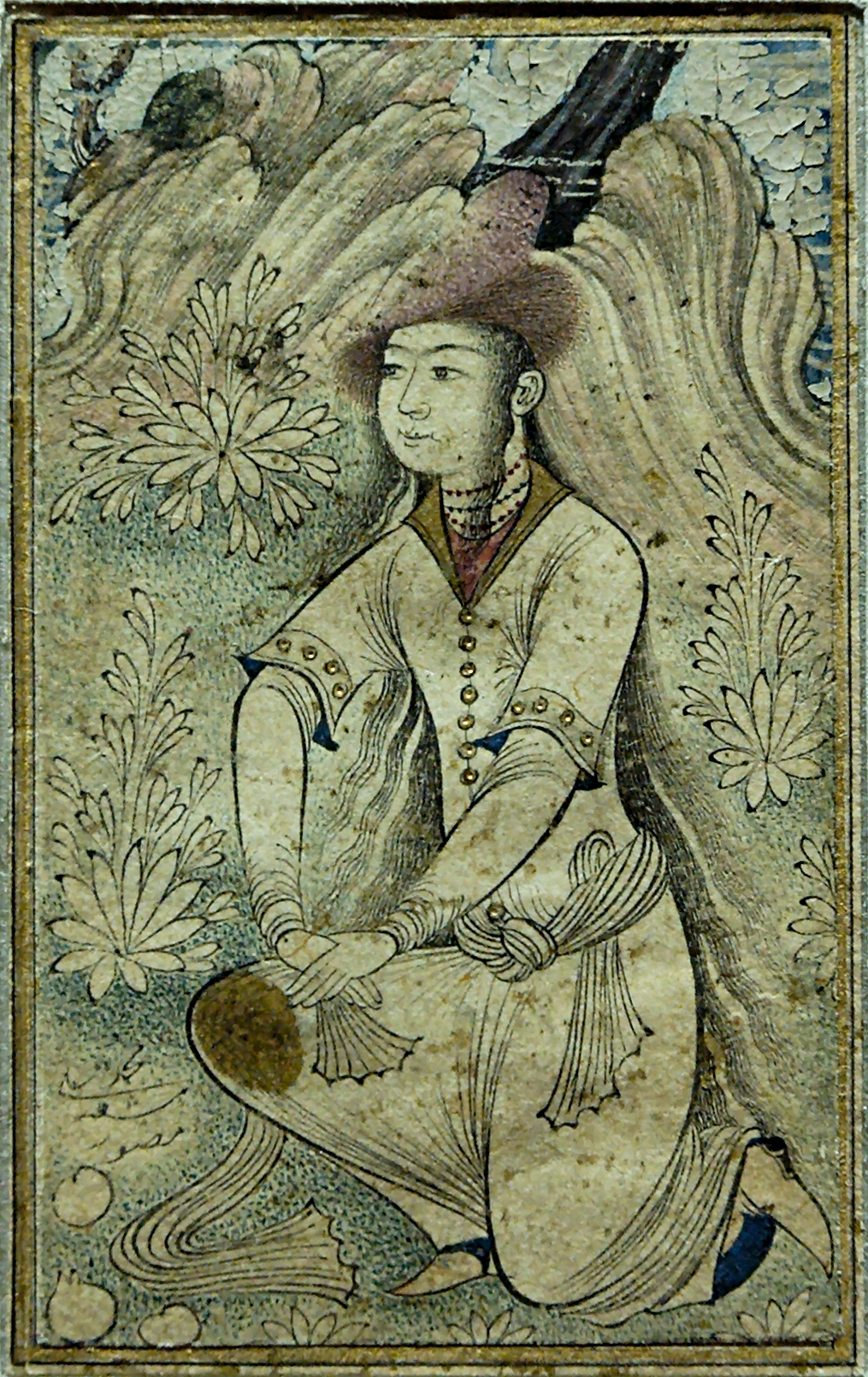
Maiden in a fur cap, by Muhammad 'Alî, Isfahan, Iran, mid-17th century

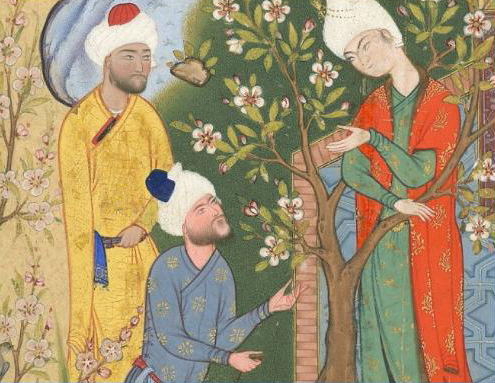
Youth and Suitors, Mashhad, Iran, 1556–1565 AD

The depiction of humans, animals or any other figurative subjects is forbidden within Islam to prevent believers from idolatry so there is no religiously motivated painting (or sculpture) tradition within Muslim culture. Pictorial activity was reduced to Arabesque, mainly abstract, with geometrical configuration or floral and plant-like patterns. Strongly connected to architecture and calligraphy, it can be widely seen as used for the painting of tiles in mosques or in illuminations around the text of the Koran and other books. In fact, abstract art is not an invention of modern art but it is present in pre-classical, barbarian and non-western cultures many centuries before it and is essentially a decorative or applied art. Notable illustrator M. C. Escher was influenced by this geometrical and pattern-based art. Art Nouveau (Aubrey Beardsley and the architect Antonio Gaudí) re-introduced abstract floral patterns into western art.

Note that despite the taboo of figurative visualization, some Muslim countries did cultivate a rich tradition in painting, though not in its own right, but as a companion to the written word. Iranian or Persian art, widely known as Persian miniature, concentrates on the illustration of epic or romantic works of literature. Persian illustrators deliberately avoided the use of shading and perspective, though familiar with it in their pre-Islamic history, in order to abide by the rule of not creating any lifelike illusion of the real world. Their aim was not to depict the world as it is, but to create images of an ideal world of timeless beauty and perfect order.

=== Iran ===
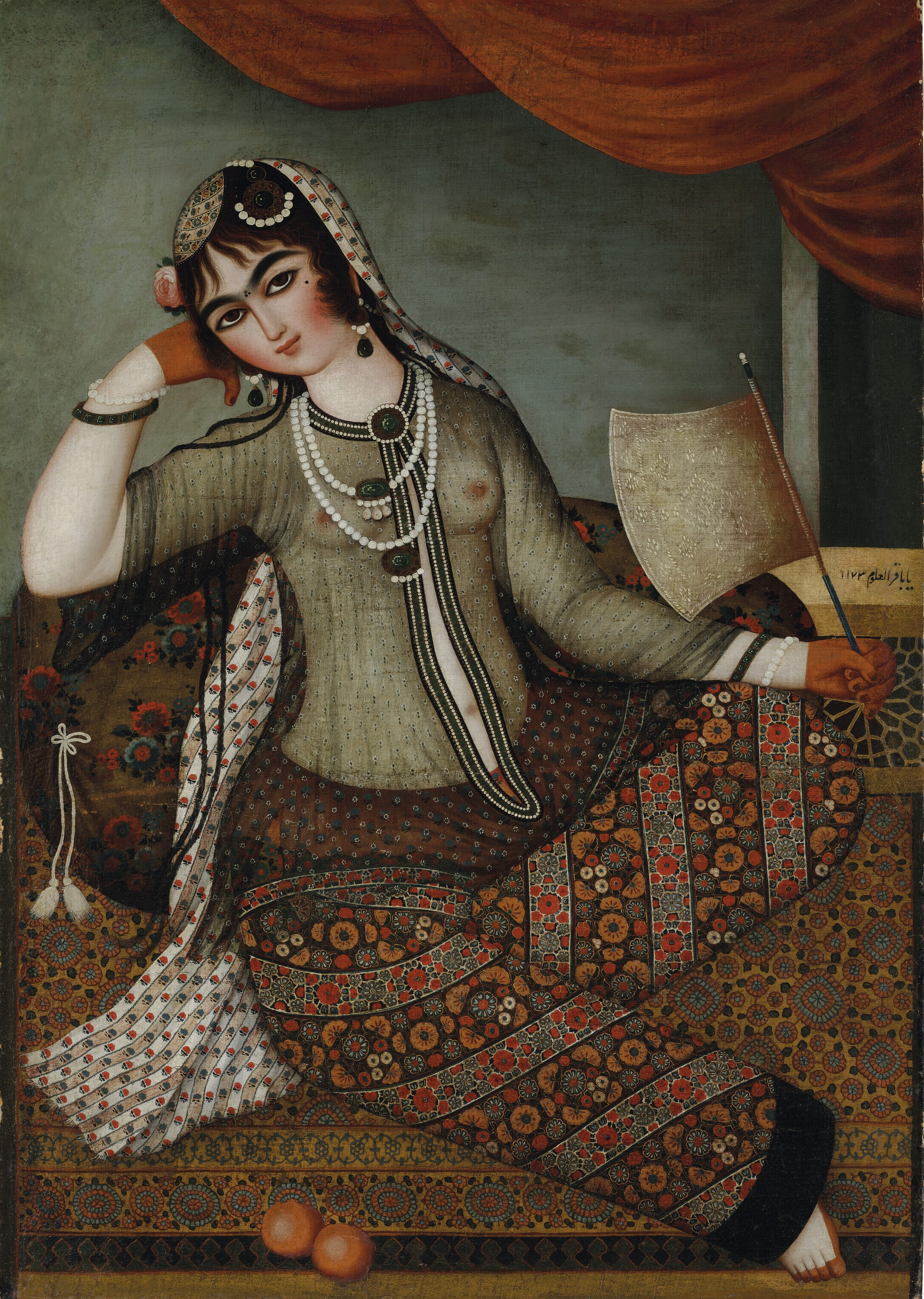
A Reclining Beauty by Mohammad Baqer. Zand era dated c. 1759/60, oil on canvas.

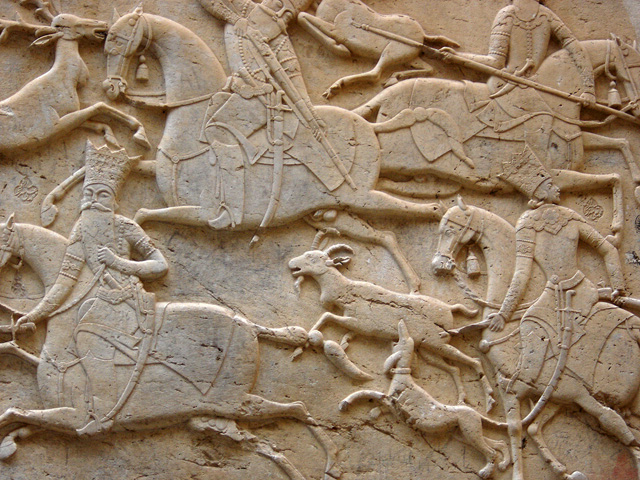
Qajar dynasty rock reliefs in Tangeh Savashi, of the Fath Ali Shah era, c. 1800, a revival of an ancient Persian type.

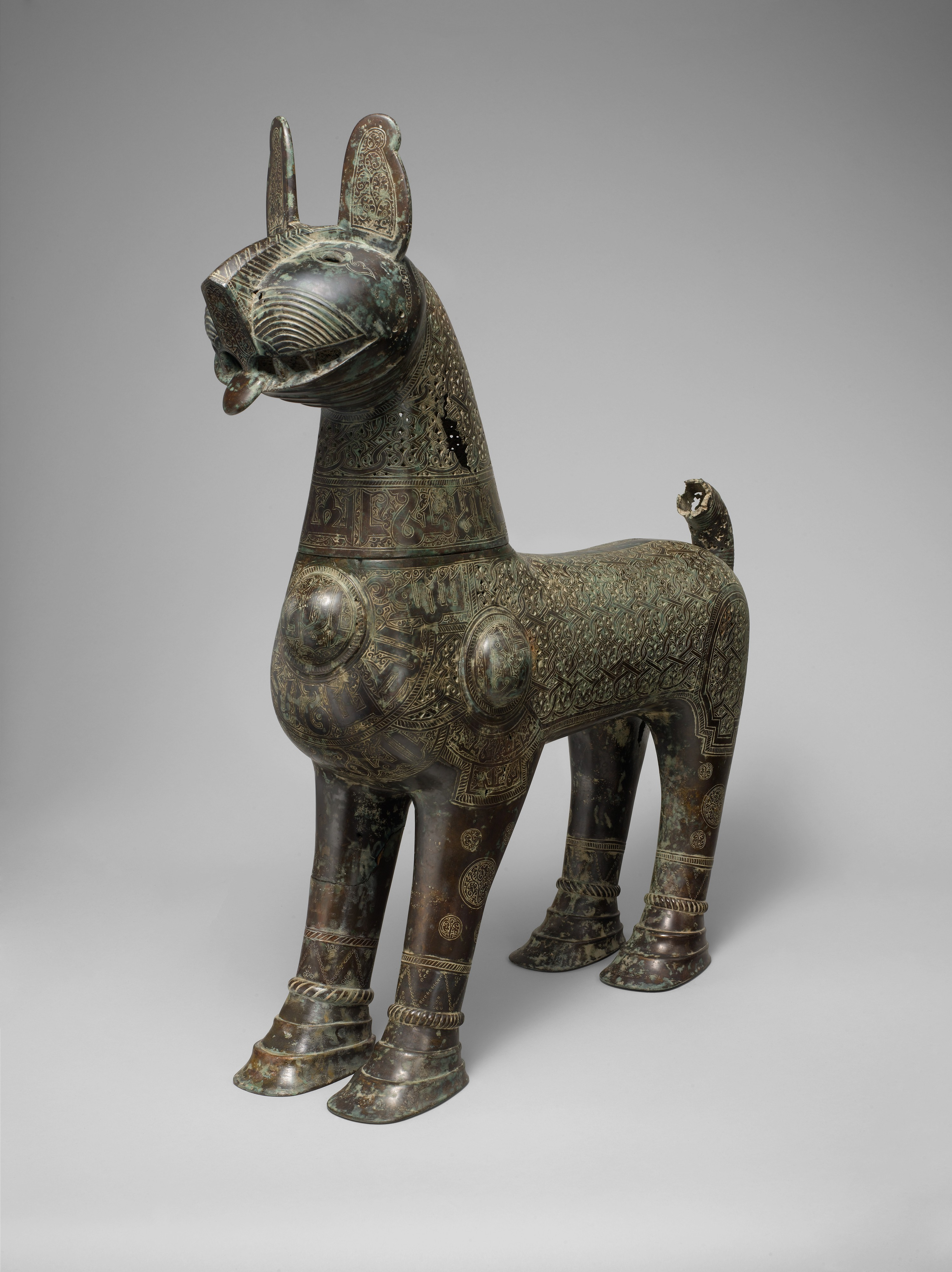
1181, Kariz, Monumental Lion shaped Zoomorphic Seljuk Incense Burner of Amir ibn Muhammad al-Mawardi. Exhibiting remarkable metalwork and refined ornamental calligraphy and engraving.

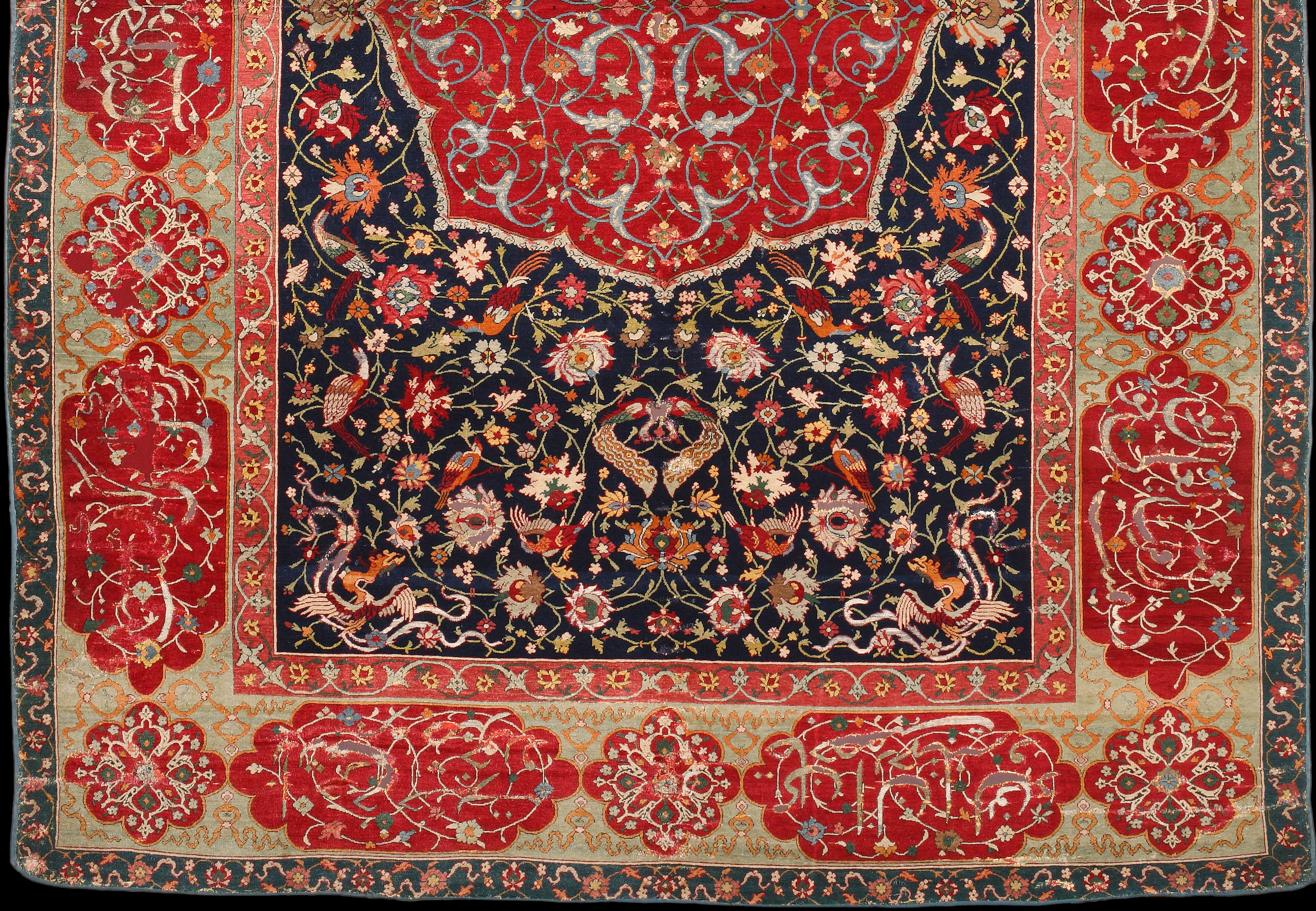
Half of a "Salting carpet", Safavid, in wool, silk and metal thread, about 1600

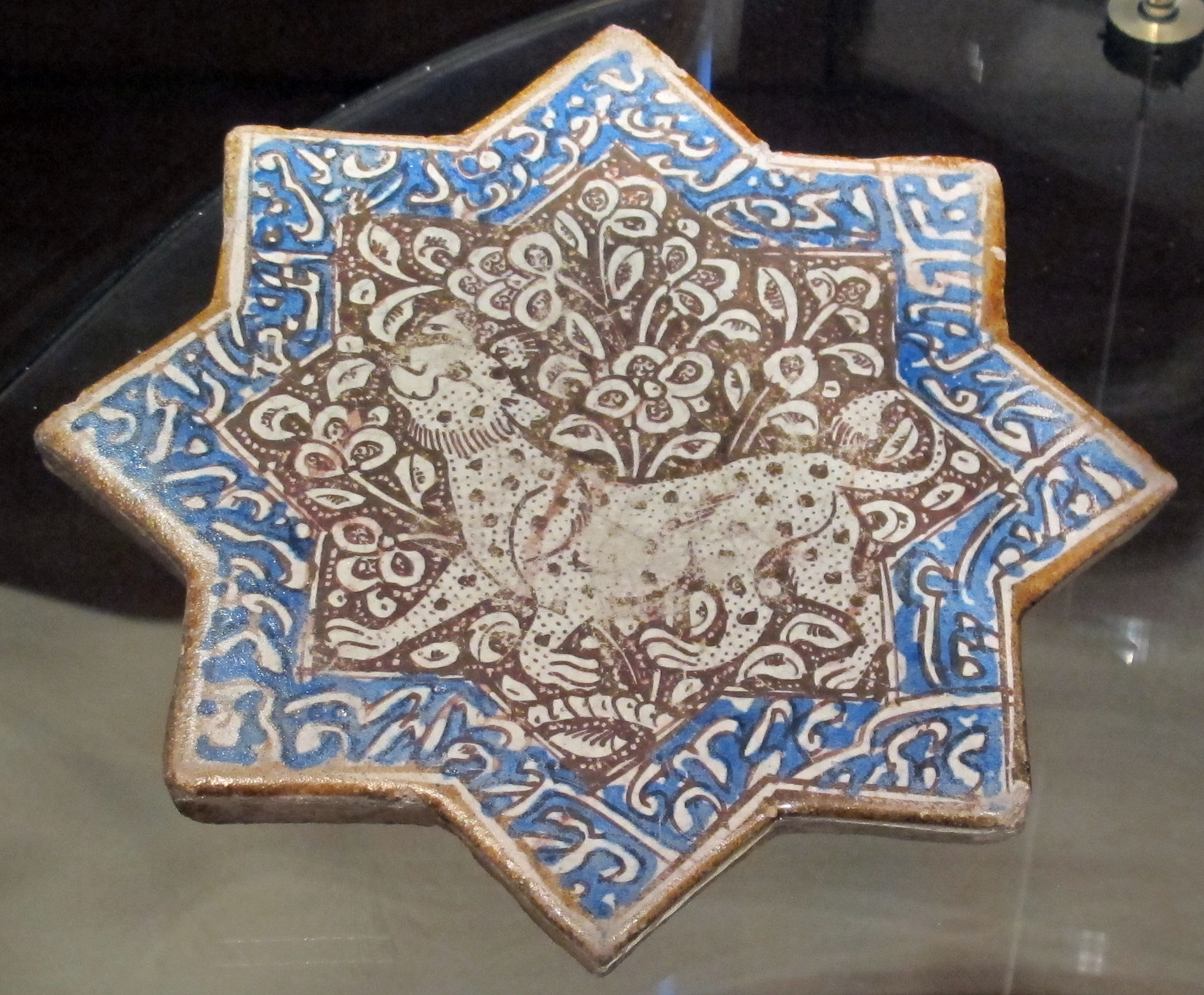
Star-tile, Kashan, 13–14th century

Persian art or Iranian art (Persian: هنر ایرانی, romanized: Honar-è Irâni) has one of the richest art heritages in world history and has been strong in many media including architecture, painting, weaving, pottery, calligraphy, metalworking and sculpture. At different times, influences from the art of neighbouring civilizations have been very important, and latterly Persian art gave and received major influences as part of the wider styles of Islamic art. This article covers the art of Persia up to 1925, and the end of the Qajar dynasty; for later art see Iranian modern and contemporary art, and for traditional crafts see arts of Iran. Rock art in Iran is its most ancient surviving art. Iranian architecture is covered at that article.

From the Achaemenid Empire of 550 BC–330 BC for most of the time a large Iranian-speaking state has ruled over areas similar to the modern boundaries of Iran, and often much wider areas, sometimes called Greater Iran, where a process of cultural Persianization left enduring results even when rulership separated. The courts of successive dynasties have generally led the style of Persian art, and court-sponsored art has left many of the most impressive survivals.

In ancient times the surviving monuments of Persian art are notable for a tradition concentrating on the human figure (mostly male, and often royal) and animals. Persian art continued to place larger emphasis on figures than Islamic art from other areas, though for religious reasons now generally avoiding large examples, especially in sculpture. The general Islamic style of dense decoration, geometrically laid out, developed in Persia into a supremely elegant and harmonious style combining motifs derived from plants with Chinese motifs such as the cloud-band, and often animals that are represented at a much smaller scale than the plant elements surrounding them. Under the Safavid dynasty in the 16th century this style was used across a wide variety of media, and diffused from the court artists of the shah, most being mainly painters.

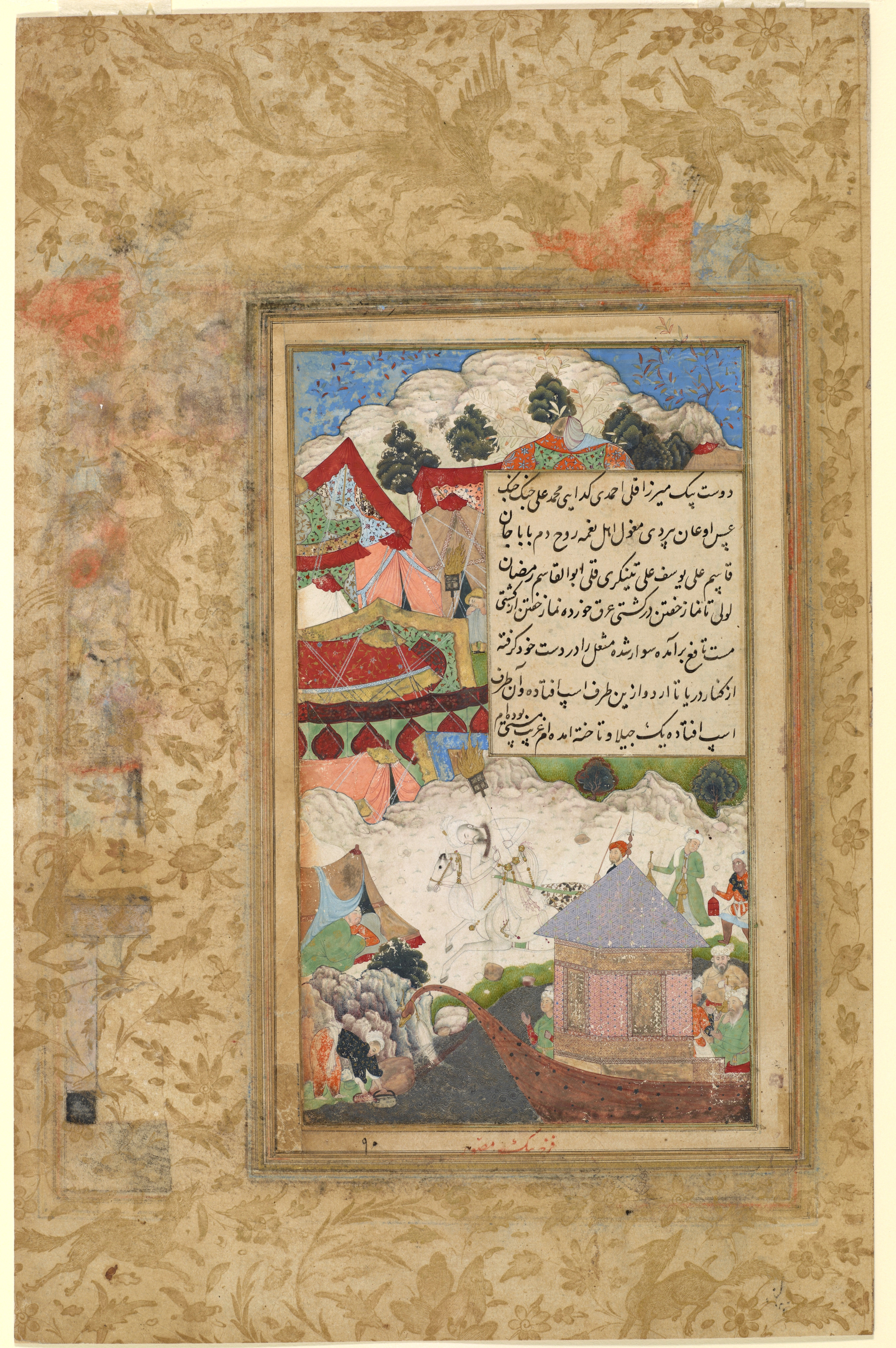
Farrukh Beg (ca. 1545 – ca. 1615), A Drunken Babur Returns to Camp at Night, Lahore, Pakistan, 1589

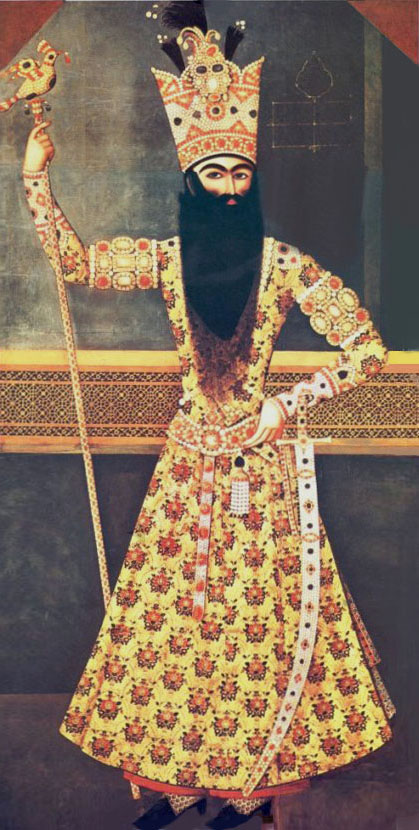
Mihr 'Ali (fl. 1795–1830), Fat'h Ali Shah Qajar (1813–14)

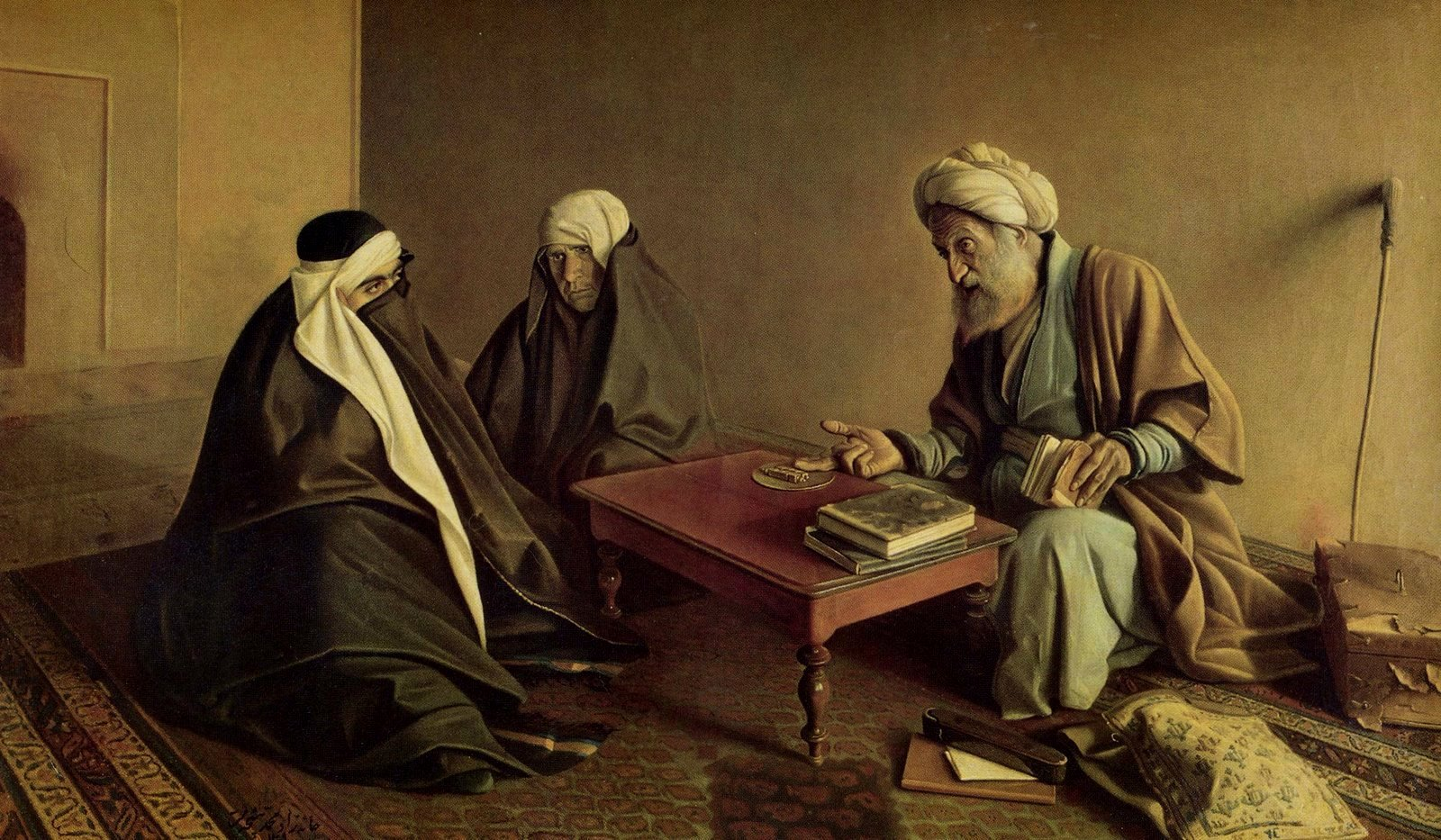
Kamal-ol-molk (1847–1940), Predictor of the Future, 1892, Museum of Sadabad, Tehran

=== Pakistan ===
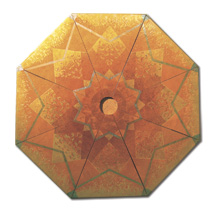
Lubna Agha, Star – a painting inspired by the artisans of Morocco

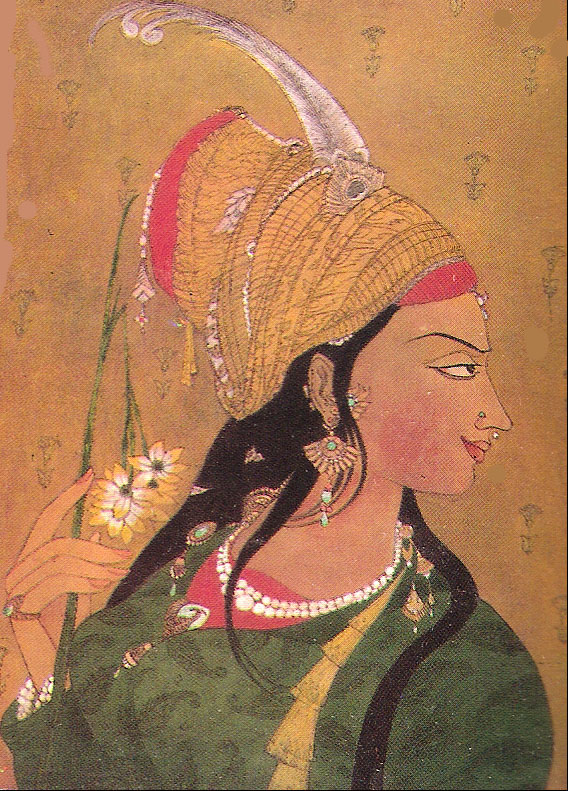
AR Chughtai, Anarkali

== Africa ==
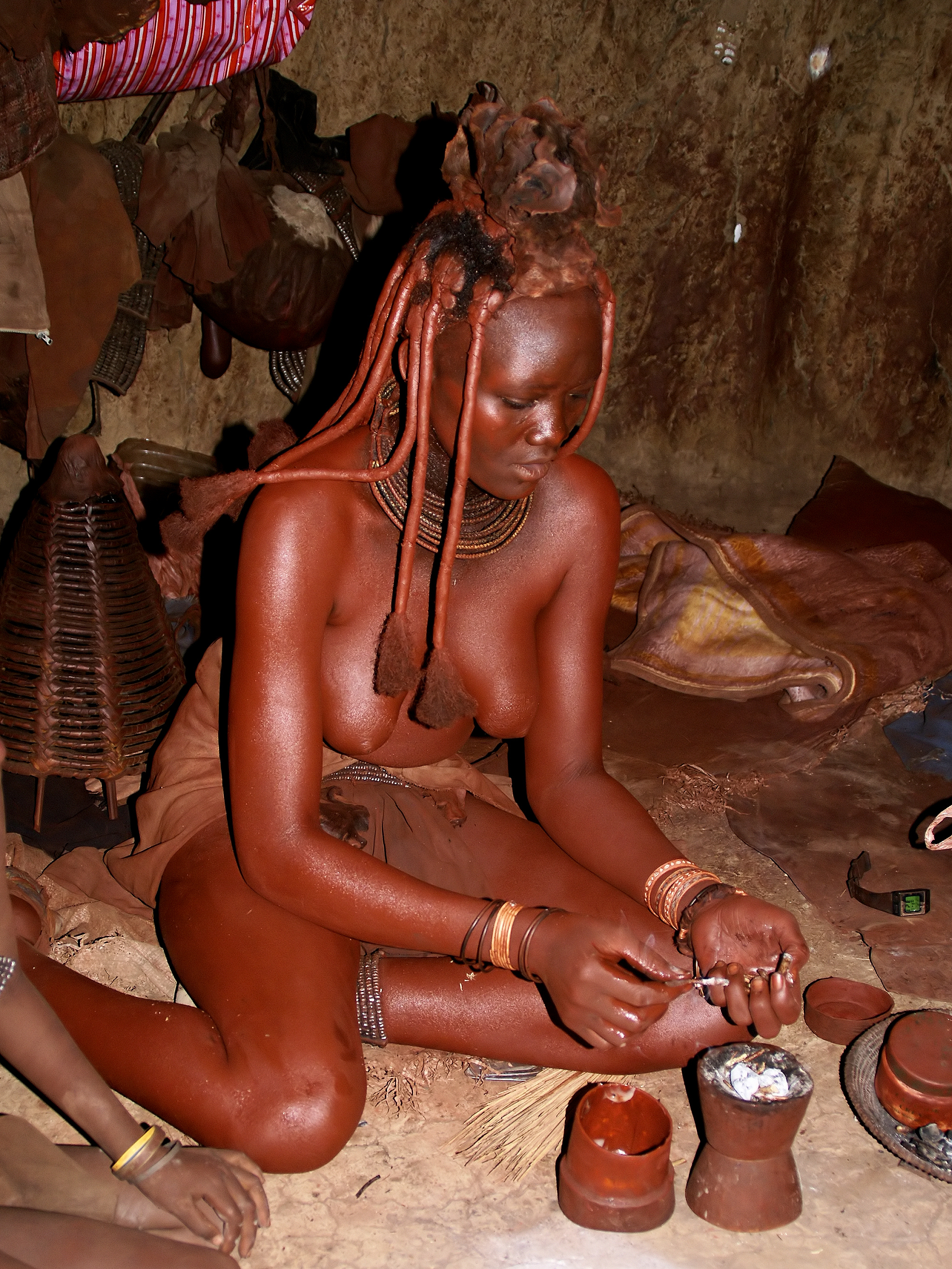
Himba woman covered with traditional red ochre pigment. Traditional body paint symbolic of the earth and of blood, and also worn for protection from the sun.

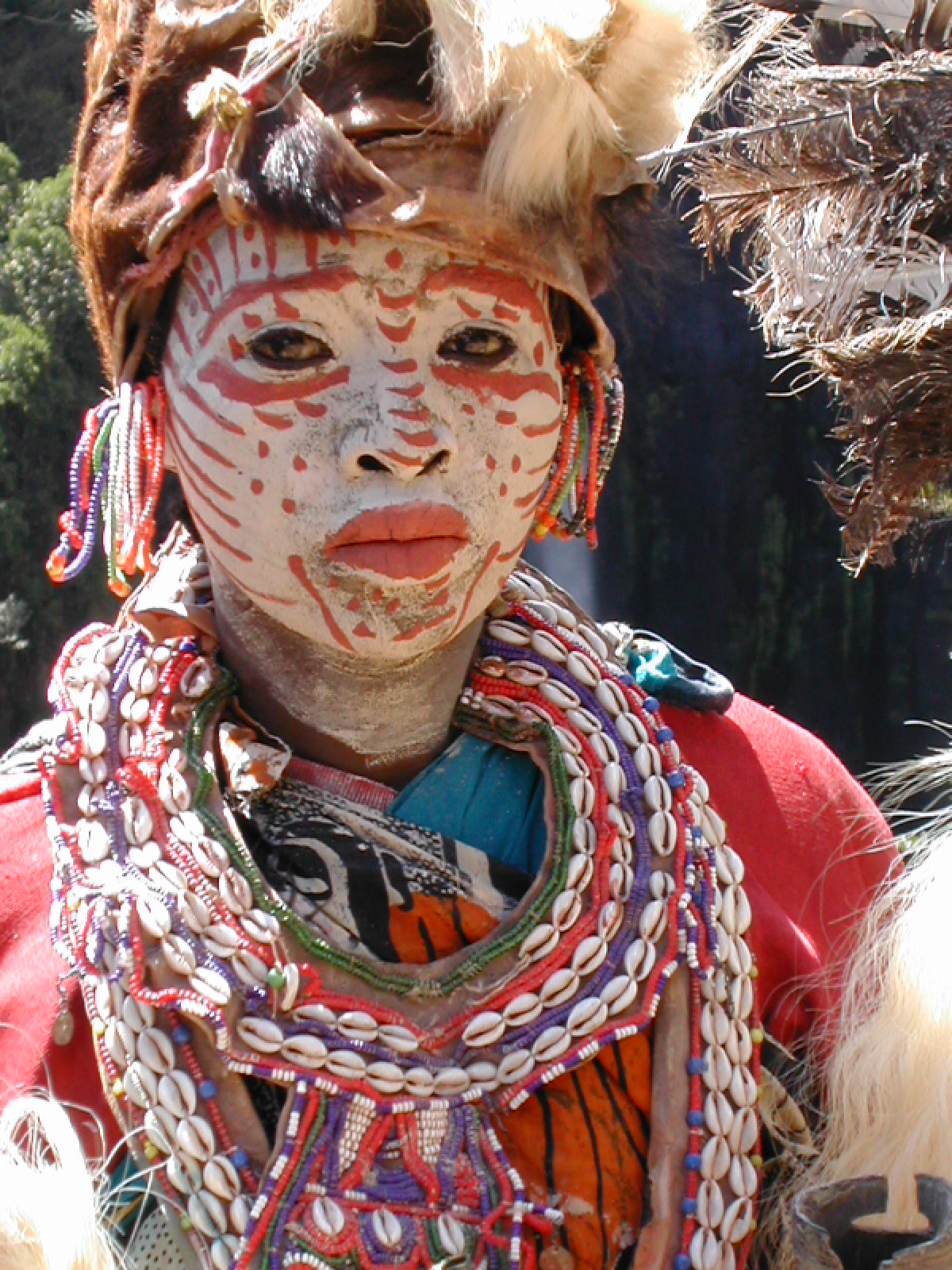
A Kĩkũyũ woman in traditional dress. Ceremonial face painting.

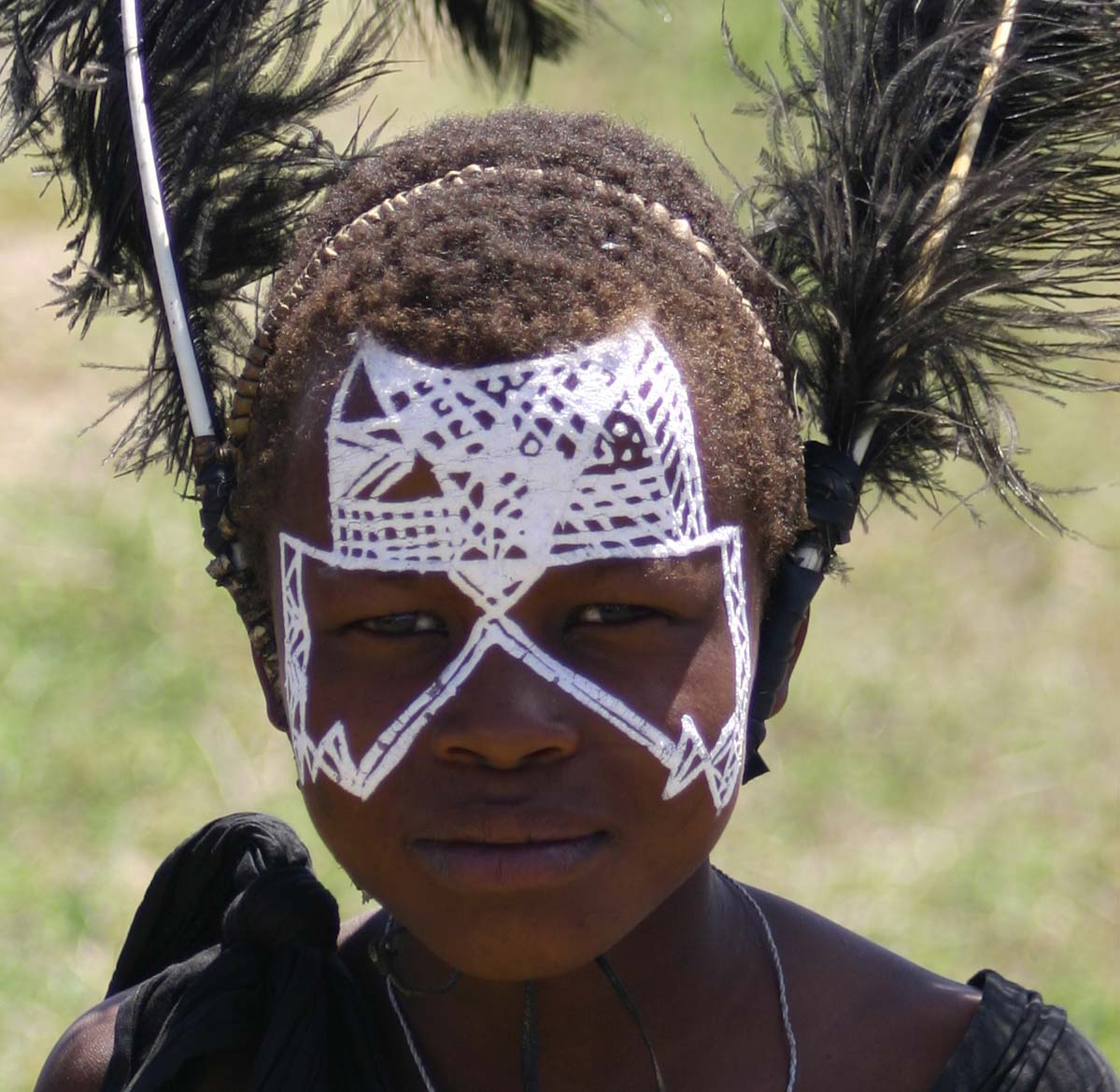
Young Maasai Warrior, with head-dress and face painting.

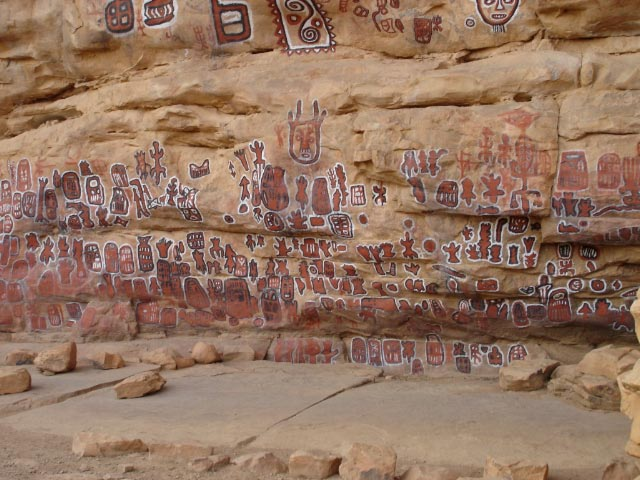
Dogon, circumcision cave, with paintings Mali c. contemporary

African traditional culture and tribes do not seem to have great interest in two-dimensional representations in favour of sculpture and relief. However, decorative painting in African culture is often abstract and geometrical. Another pictorial manifestation is body painting, and face painting present for example in Maasai and Kĩkũyũ culture in their ceremony rituals. Ceremonial cave painting in certain villages can be found to be still in use. Note that Pablo Picasso and other modern artists were influenced by African sculpture and masks in their varied styles. Contemporary African artists follow western art movements and their paintings have little difference from occidental art works.

=== Sudanese ===
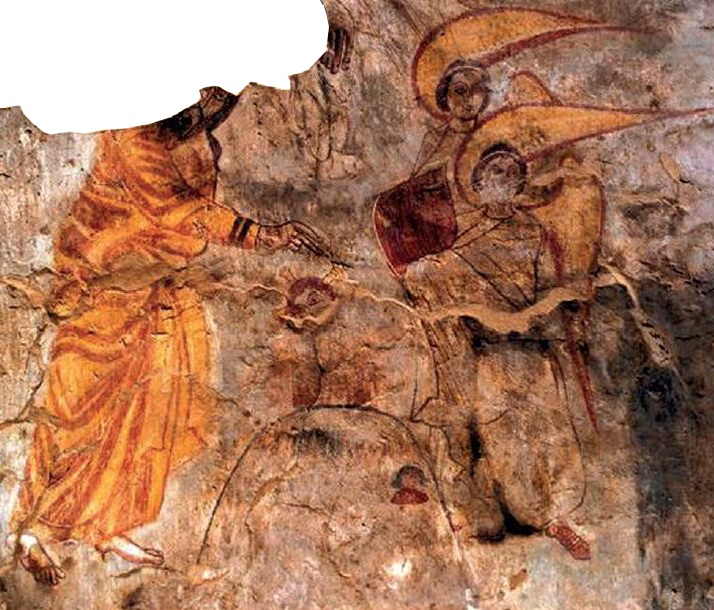
Baptism of Christ on a medieval Nubian painting from Old Dongola

The Kingdom of Kush in ancient Nubia (i.e. modern Sudan), bordering Ancient Egypt, produced a wide variety of arts, including wall paintings and painted objects. At the Sudanese site of Kerma, center of the Kerma culture that predated the Kingdom of Kush, a circa 1700 BC fragmentary painting from a royal tomb depicts a sailing ship and houses with ladders that are similar to scenes in reliefs from the reign of Egyptian queen Hatshepsut (c. 1479–1458 BC). The ancient tradition of wall paintings, first described by Abu Salih during the 12th century AD, continued into the period of medieval Nubia.

=== Ethiopian ===
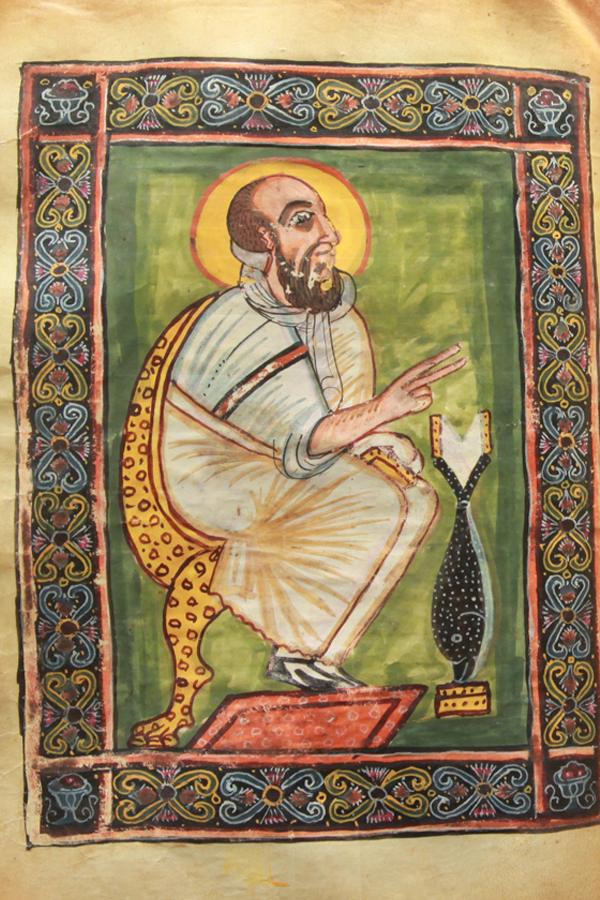
An Ethiopian illuminated Evangelist portrait of Mark the Evangelist, from the Ethiopian Garima Gospels, 6th century AD, Kingdom of Aksum

The Christian tradition of painting in Ethiopia dates back to the 4th century AD, during the ancient Kingdom of Aksum. During their exile to Axum, the 7th-century followers of Muhammad described paintings decorating the Church of Our Lady Mary of Zion. However, the earliest surviving examples of church paintings in Ethiopia come from the church of Debre Selam Mikael in the Tigray Region, dated to the 11th century AD. Ethiopian paintings in illuminated manuscripts predate the earliest surviving church paintings. For instance, the Ethiopian Garima Gospels of the 4th-6th centuries AD contain illuminated scenes imitating the contemporary Byzantine illuminated style.

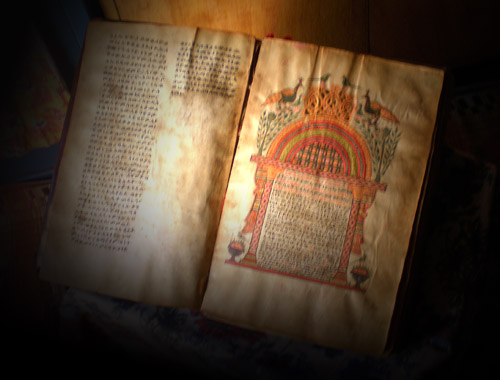
An illuminated Bible from a monastery on Lake Tana, Ethiopia, 12th-13th century AD

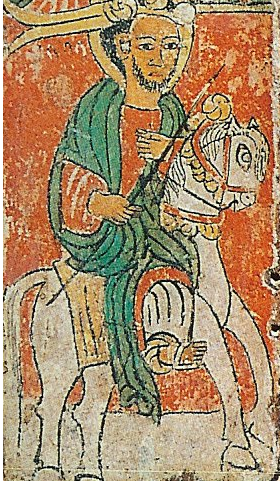
A 15th-century Ethiopian painting of the Solomonic dynasty depicting the Zagwe dynasty ruler Gebre Mesqel Lalibela (r. 1181–1221 AD)

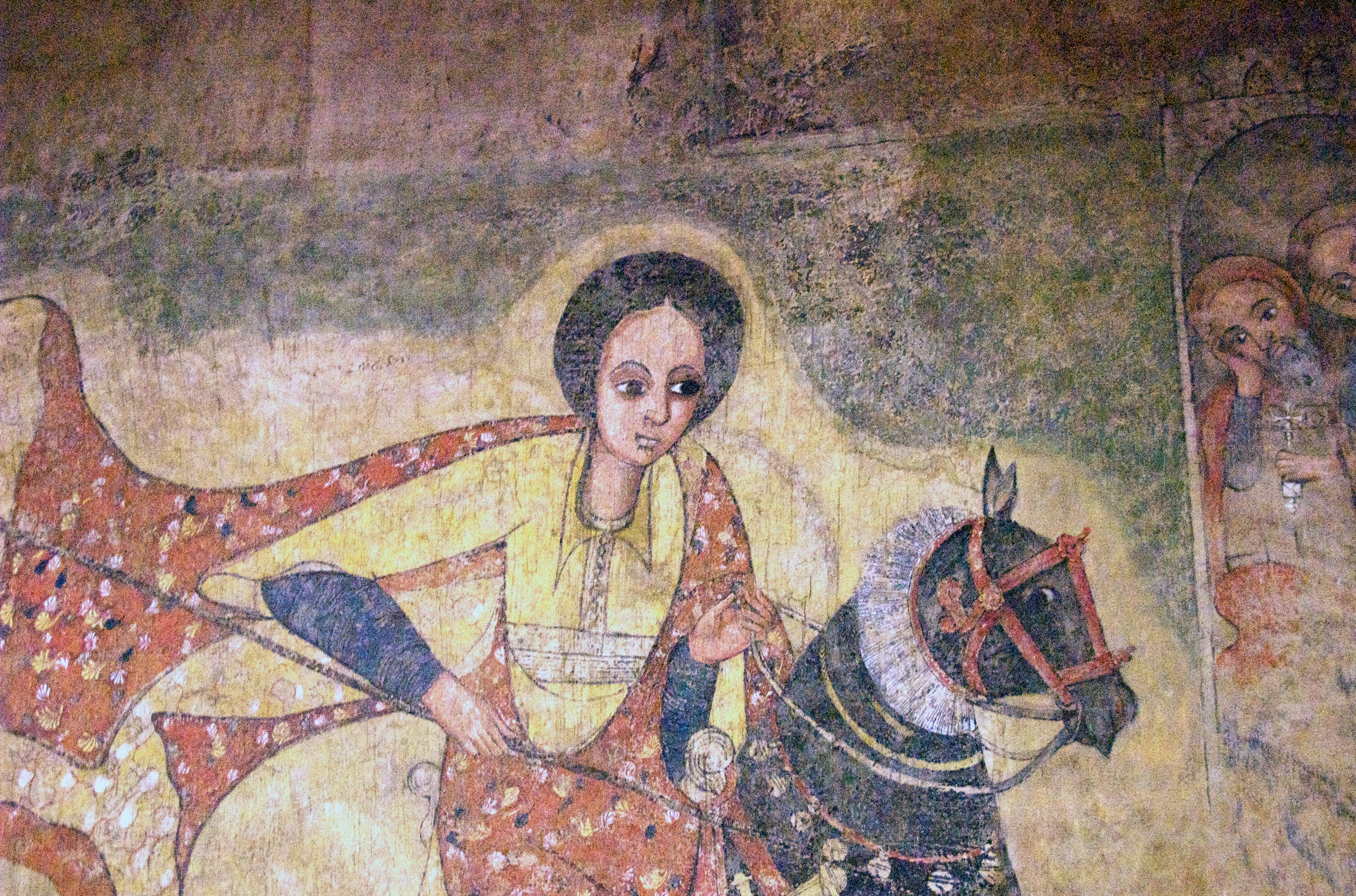
A 17th-century Gondarene-style Ethiopian painting depicting Saint Mercurius, originally from Lalibela, now housed in the National Museum of Ethiopia in Addis Ababa

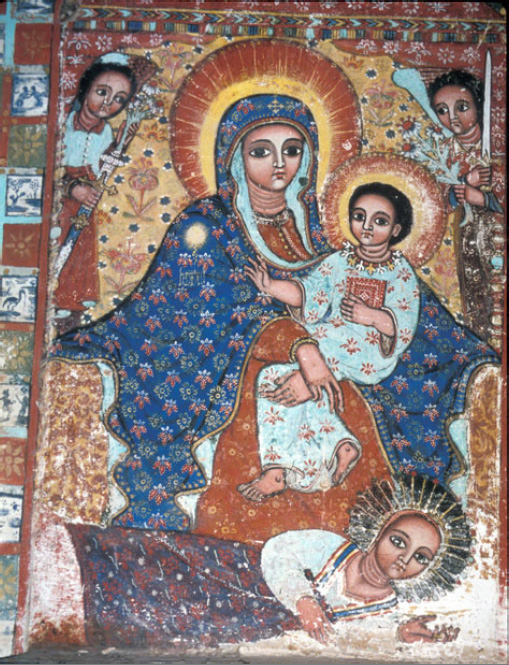
A 1748 portrait of the Ethiopian Empress Mentewab, an important figure of the Zemene Mesafint, prostrating herself before Mary and Jesus, from the Narga Selassie church.

=== Influence on Western art ===
At the start of the 20th century, artists like Picasso, Matisse, Paul Gauguin and Modigliani became aware of, and were inspired by, African art. In a situation where the established avant garde was straining against the constraints imposed by serving the world of appearances, African Art demonstrated the power of supremely well organised forms; produced not only by responding to the faculty of sight, but also and often primarily, the faculty of imagination, emotion and mystical and religious experience. These artists saw in African art a formal perfection and sophistication unified with phenomenal expressive power.

== See also ==
- 20th-century Western painting
- Art periods
- Hierarchy of genres
- List of painters
- Lives of the Most Excellent Painters, Sculptors, and Architects
- Timeline of Italian artists to 1800
