= Colorado River =

Major river in the western United States and Mexico

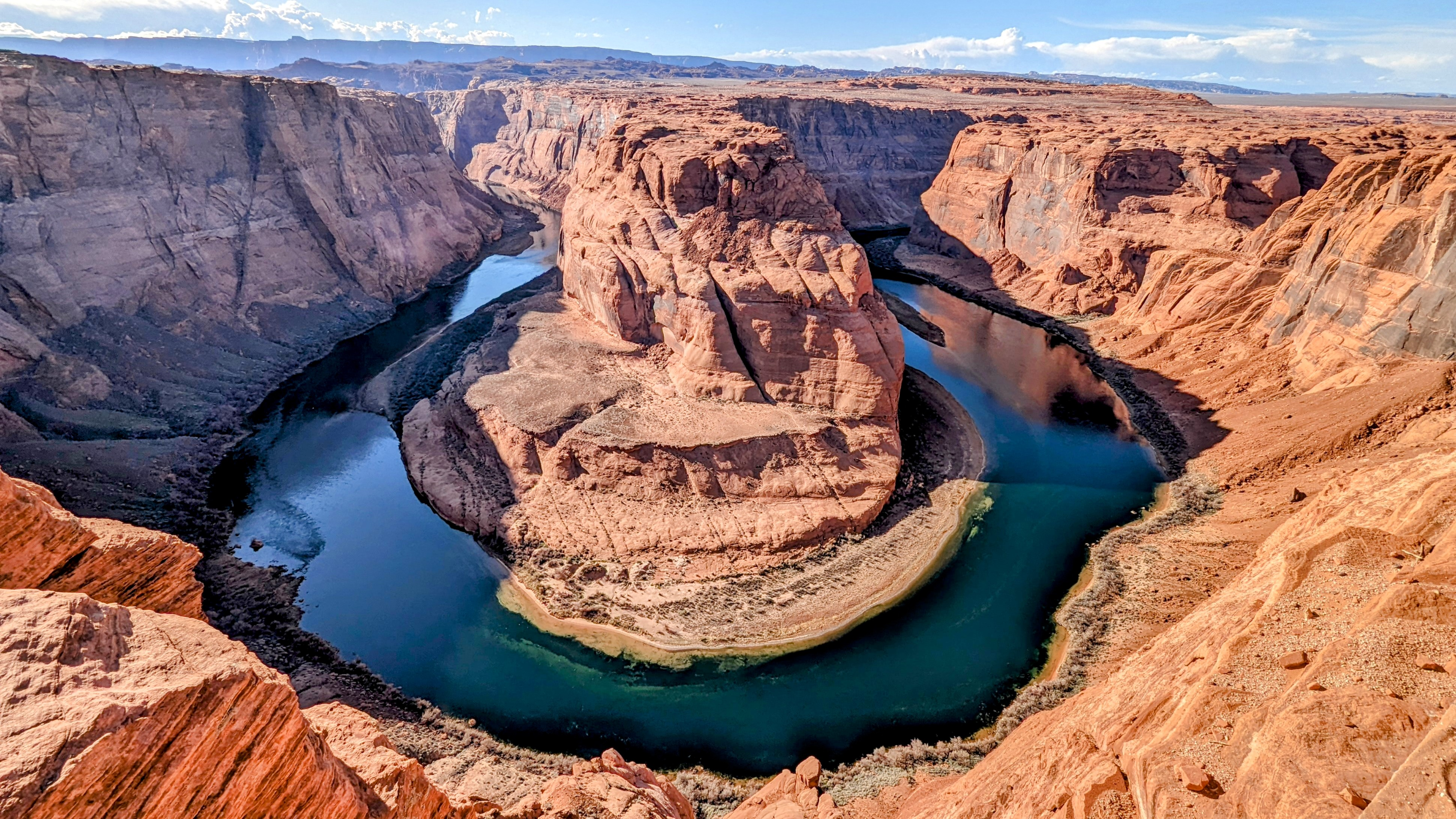
- The Colorado River at Horseshoe Bend, Arizona, a few miles below Glen Canyon Dam

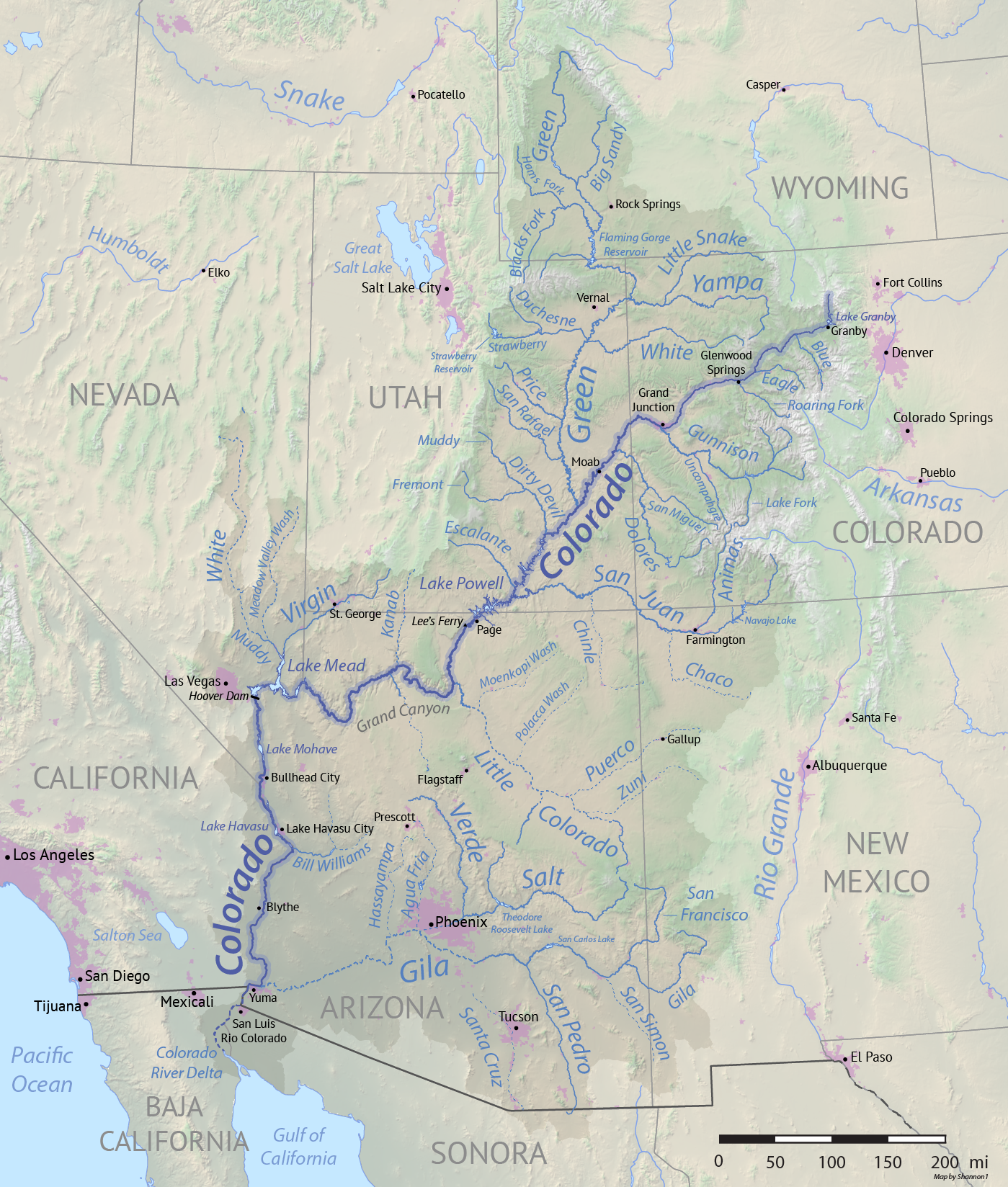
- A map of the Colorado River basin

Location
- Countries: United States, Mexico
- States: Colorado, Utah, Arizona, Nevada, California, Baja California, Sonora
- Cities: Glenwood Springs, CO, Grand Junction, CO, Moab, UT, Page, AZ, Bullhead City, AZ, Lake Havasu City, AZ, Blythe, CA, Yuma, AZ, Las Vegas, NV, Laughlin, NV, San Luis Río Colorado, SON

Physical characteristics
- Source: La Poudre Pass
  - location: Rocky Mountains, CO
  - coordinates: 40°28′20″N 105°49′34″W
  - elevation: 10,184 ft (3,104 m)
- Mouth: Gulf of California
  - location: Colorado River Delta, BCN–SON
  - coordinates: 31°48′54″N 114°48′00″W
  - elevation: 0 ft (0 m)
- Length: 1,450 mi (2,330 km)
- Basin size: 246,000 sq mi (640,000 km^{2})
- Discharge
  - location: Lees Ferry, AZ
  - average: 17,850 cu ft/s (505 m^{3}/s)
  - minimum: 750 cu ft/s (21 m^{3}/s)
  - maximum: 300,000 cu ft/s (8,500 m^{3}/s)

Basin features
- Tributaries
  - left: Fraser River, Blue River, Eagle River, Roaring Fork River, Gunnison River, Dolores River, San Juan River, Little Colorado River, Bill Williams River, Gila River
  - right: Green River, Dirty Devil River, Escalante River, Kanab River, Virgin River, Hardy River

The Colorado River (Spanish: Río Colorado) is one of the principal rivers (along with the Rio Grande) in the Southwestern United States and in northern Mexico. The 1,450-mile-long (2,330 km) river, the fifth-longest in the United States, drains an expansive, arid watershed that encompasses parts of seven U.S. states and two Mexican states. The name Colorado derives from the Spanish language for "colored reddish" due to its heavy silt load. Starting in the Rocky Mountains of Colorado, it flows generally southwest across the Colorado Plateau and through the Grand Canyon before reaching Lake Mead on the Arizona–Nevada border, where it turns south toward the international border. After entering Mexico, the Colorado approaches the mostly dry Colorado River Delta at the tip of the Gulf of California between Baja California and Sonora.

Known for its dramatic canyons, whitewater rapids, and eleven U.S. National Parks, the Colorado River and its tributaries are a vital source of water for 40 million people. An extensive system of dams, reservoirs, and aqueducts divert almost its entire flow for agricultural irrigation and urban water supply. Its large flow and steep gradient are used to generate hydroelectricity, meeting peaking power demands in much of the Intermountain West. Intensive water consumption has dried up the lower 100 miles (160 km) of the river, which has rarely reached the sea since the 1960s.

Native Americans have inhabited the Colorado River basin for at least 8,000 years. Starting around 1 CE, large agriculture-based societies were established, but a combination of drought and poor land use practices led to their collapse in the 1300s. Their descendants include tribes such as the Puebloans, while others including the Navajo settled in the Colorado Basin after the 1000s. In the 1500s, Spanish explorers began mapping and claiming the watershed, which became part of Mexico upon winning its independence from Spain in 1821. Even after most of the watershed became US territory in 1846, much of the river's course remained unknown. Several expeditions charted the Colorado in the mid-19th century—one of which, led by John Wesley Powell, was the first to run the rapids of the Grand Canyon. Large-scale settlement of the lower basin began in the mid- to late-1800s, with steamboats sailing from the Gulf of California to landings along the river that linked to wagon roads to the interior. Starting in the 1860s, gold and silver strikes drew prospectors to the upper Colorado River basin.

Large-scale river management began in the early 1900s, with major guidelines established in a series of international and US interstate treaties known as the "Law of the River". The US federal government constructed most of the major dams and aqueducts between 1910 and 1970; the largest, Hoover Dam, was completed in 1935. Numerous water projects have also involved state and local governments. With all of their waters fully allocated, both the Colorado and the neighboring Rio Grande are now considered among the most controlled and litigated river systems in the world. Since 2000, extended drought has conflicted with increasing demands for Colorado River water, and the level of human development and control of the river continues to generate controversy.

== Course ==
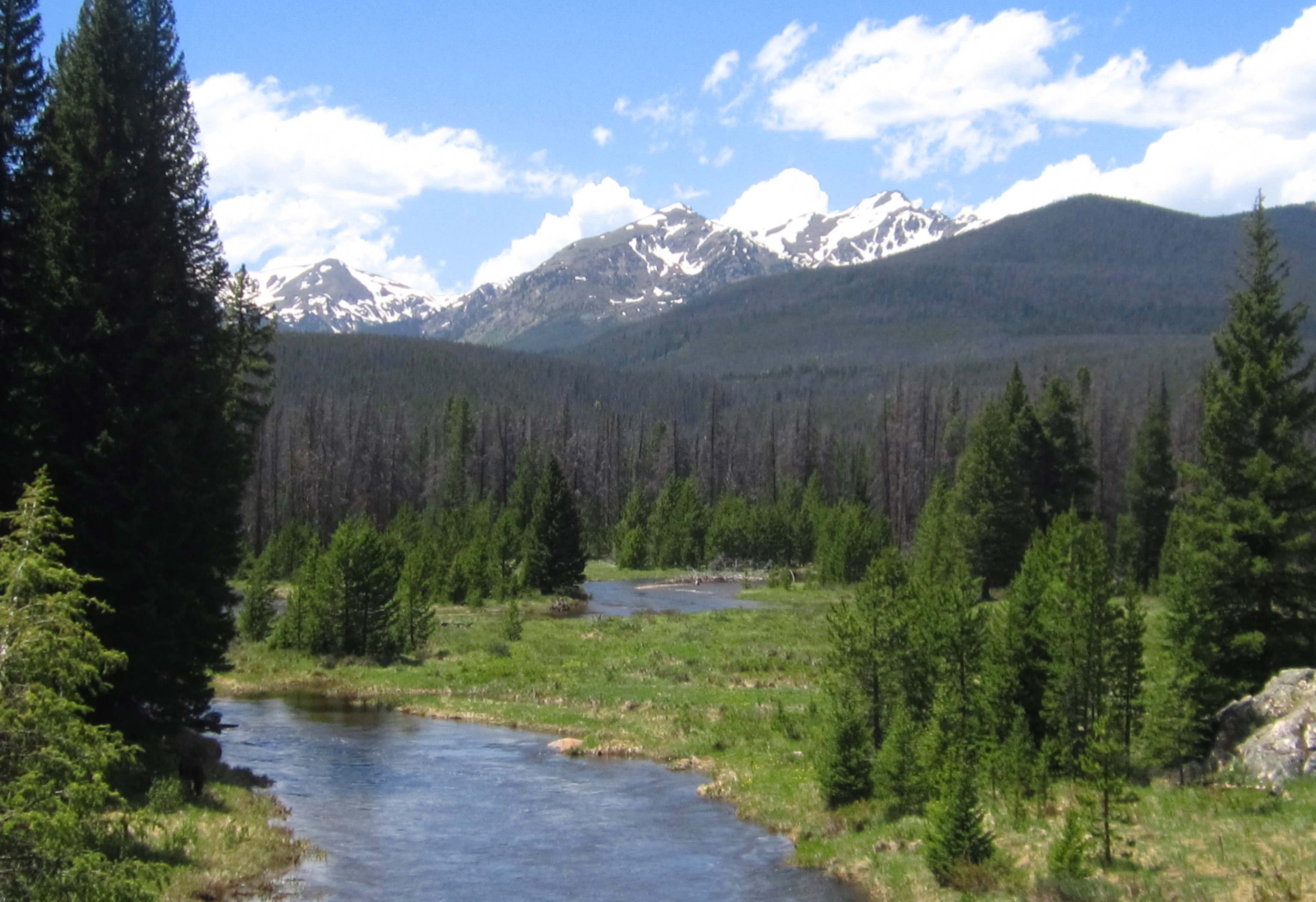
The headwaters of the Colorado River in Rocky Mountain National Park, Colorado

The Colorado begins as many tributaries in Wyoming and Colorado, the largest being the Green River. The Colorado River itself starts in Rocky Mountain National Park then makes a short run south, then the river turns west below Grand Lake, the largest natural lake in Colorado state. For the first 250 miles (400 km) of its course, the Colorado carves its way through the mountainous Western Slope, a sparsely populated region defined by the portion of the state west of the Continental Divide. As it flows southwest, it gains strength from many small tributaries, as well as larger ones including the Blue, Eagle and Roaring Fork rivers.

After passing through De Beque Canyon, the Colorado emerges from the Rockies into the Grand Valley, a major farming and ranching region where it meets one of its largest tributaries, the Gunnison River, at Grand Junction. Most of the upper river is a swift whitewater stream ranging from 200 to 500 feet (60 to 150 m) wide, the depth ranging from 6 to 30 feet (2 to 9 m), with a few notable exceptions, such as the Blackrocks reach where the river is nearly 100 feet (30 m) deep. In a few areas, such as the marshy Kawuneeche Valley near the headwaters and the Grand Valley, it exhibits braided characteristics.

From Grand Junction, the Colorado turns northwest before cutting southwest across the eponymous Colorado Plateau, a vast area of high desert centered at the Four Corners of the southwestern United States. Here, the climate becomes significantly drier than that in the Rocky Mountains, and the river becomes entrenched in progressively deeper gorges of bare rock, beginning with Ruby Canyon and then Westwater Canyon as it enters Utah, now once again heading southwest. Farther downstream it receives the Dolores River and defines the southern border of Arches National Park, before passing Moab and flowing through "The Portal", where it exits the Moab Valley between a pair of 1,000-foot (300 m) sandstone cliffs.

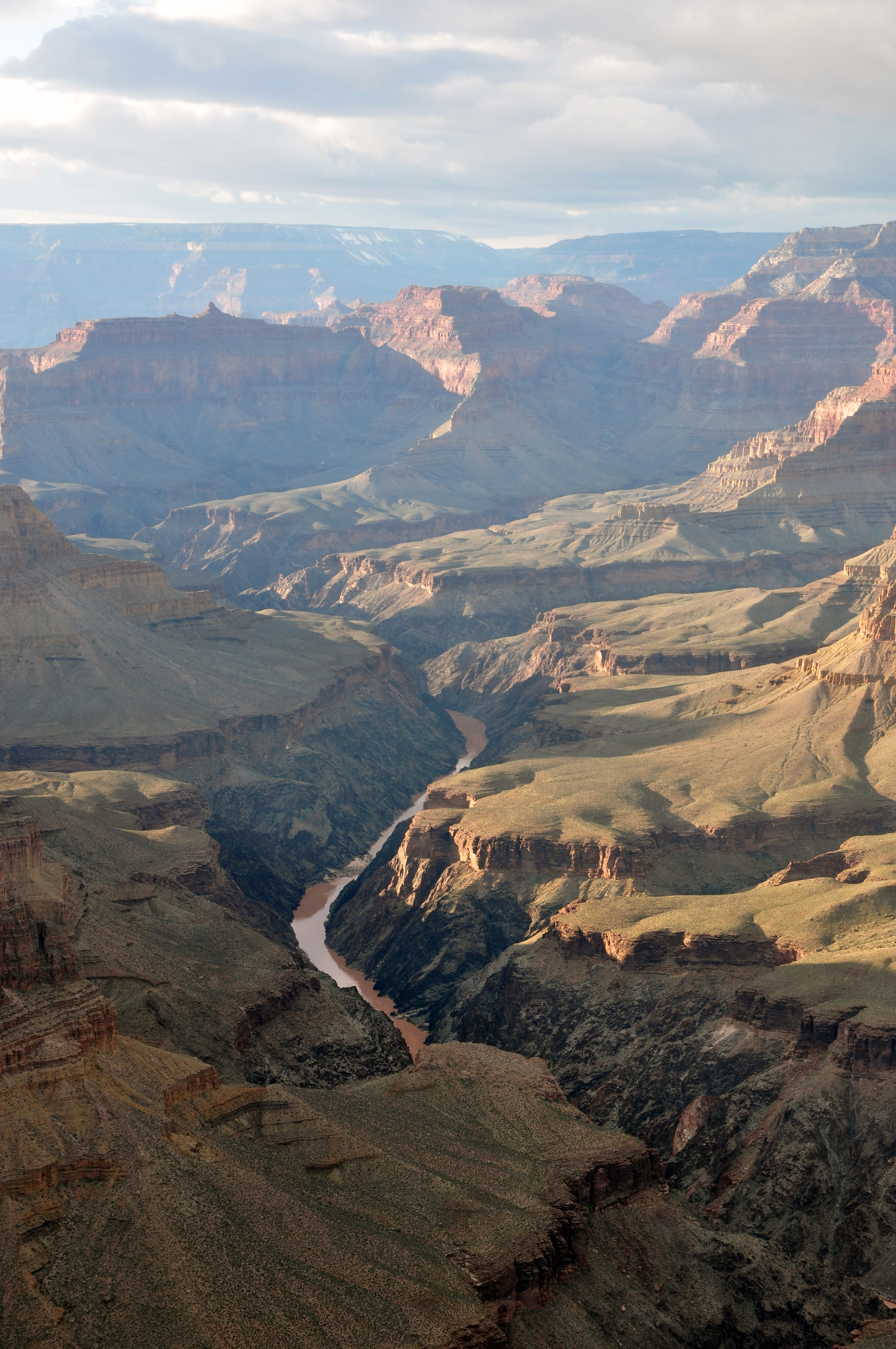
The Colorado River in the Grand Canyon seen from Pima Point, near Hermit's Rest

In Utah, the Colorado flows primarily through the "slickrock" country, which is characterized by its narrow canyons and unique "folds" created by the tilting of sedimentary rock layers along faults. This is one of the most inaccessible regions of the continental United States. Below the confluence with the Green River, its largest tributary, in Canyonlands National Park, the Colorado enters Cataract Canyon, named for its dangerous rapids, and then Glen Canyon, known for its arches and erosion-sculpted Navajo sandstone formations. Here, the San Juan River, carrying runoff from the southern slope of Colorado's San Juan Mountains, joins the Colorado from the east. The Colorado then enters northern Arizona, where since the 1960s Glen Canyon Dam near Page has flooded the Glen Canyon reach of the river, forming Lake Powell for hydroelectricity generation.

In Arizona, the river passes Lee's Ferry, an important crossing for early explorers and settlers and since the early 20th century the principal point where Colorado River flows are measured for apportionment to the seven U.S. and two Mexican states in the basin. Downstream, the river enters Marble Canyon, the beginning of the Grand Canyon, passing under the Navajo Bridges on a now southward course. Below the confluence with the Little Colorado River, the river swings west into Granite Gorge, the most dramatic portion of the Grand Canyon, where the river cuts up to one mile (1.6 km) into the Colorado Plateau, exposing some of the oldest visible rocks on Earth, dating as long ago as 2 billion years. The 277 miles (446 km) of the river that flow through the Grand Canyon are largely encompassed by Grand Canyon National Park and are known for their difficult whitewater, separated by pools that reach up to 110 feet (34 m) in depth.

At the lower end of Grand Canyon, the Colorado widens into Lake Mead, the largest reservoir in the continental United States, formed by Hoover Dam on the border of Arizona and Nevada. Situated southeast of metropolitan Las Vegas, the dam is an integral component for management of the Colorado River, controlling floods and storing water for farms and cities in the lower Colorado River basin. Below the dam the river passes under the Mike O'Callaghan–Pat Tillman Memorial Bridge—which at nearly 900 feet (270 m) above the water is the highest concrete arch bridge in the Western Hemisphere—and then turns due south towards Mexico, defining the Arizona–Nevada and Arizona–California borders.

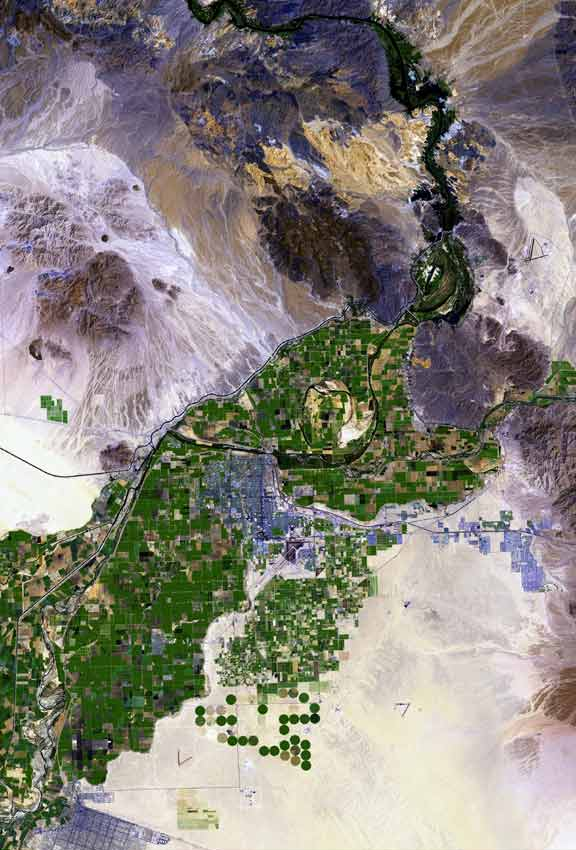
A satellite view of the Colorado River valley near Yuma, Arizona. Interstate 8 runs from left to right just below center.

After leaving the confines of the Black Canyon, the river emerges from the Colorado Plateau into the Lower Colorado River Valley (LCRV), a desert region dependent on irrigation agriculture and tourism and also home to several major Indian reservations. The river widens here to a broad, moderately deep waterway averaging 500 to 1,000 feet (150 to 300 m) wide and reaching up to 0.25 miles (400 m) across, with depths ranging from 8 to 60 feet (2 to 20 m). Before channelization of the Colorado in the 20th century, the lower river was subject to frequent course changes caused by seasonal flow variations. Joseph C. Ives, who surveyed the lower river in 1861, wrote that "the shifting of the channel, the banks, the islands, the bars is so continual and rapid that a detailed description, derived from the experiences of one trip, would be found incorrect, not only during the subsequent year, but perhaps in the course of a week, or even a day."

The LCRV is one of the most densely populated areas along the river, and there are numerous towns including Bullhead City, Arizona, Needles, California, and Lake Havasu City, Arizona. Here, several large diversions draw from the river, providing water for both local uses and distant regions including the Salt River Valley of Arizona and metropolitan Southern California. The last major U.S. diversion is at Imperial Dam, where over 90 percent of the river's flow is moved into the Gila Gravity Canal and Yuma Area Project, and the much bigger All-American Canal to irrigate California's Imperial Valley, the most productive winter agricultural region in the United States.

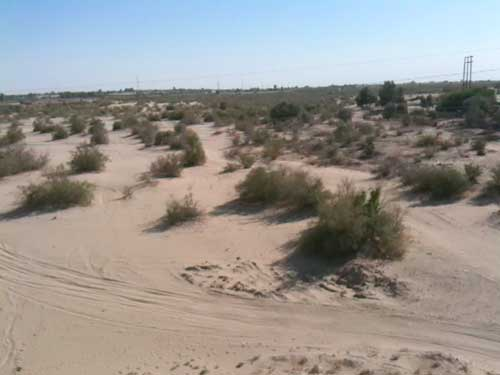
The Colorado River as it exits the United States into Mexico beneath the San Luis Colorado-Colonia Miguel Alemán Bridge (September 2009)

Below Imperial Dam, only a small portion of the Colorado River makes it beyond Yuma, Arizona, and the confluence with the intermittent Gila River—which carries runoff from western New Mexico and most of Arizona–before defining 24 miles (39 km) of the Mexico–United States border. At Morelos Dam, the entire remaining flow of the Colorado is diverted to irrigate the Mexicali Valley, among Mexico's most fertile agricultural lands.

Below San Luis Río Colorado, the Colorado passes entirely into Mexico, defining the Baja California–Sonora border. Since 1960, the stretch of the Colorado between here and the Gulf of California has been dry or a trickle formed by irrigation return flows. The Hardy River provides most of the flow into the Colorado River Delta, a vast alluvial floodplain covering about 3,000 square miles (7,800 km^{2}) of northwestern Mexico. A large estuary is formed here before the Colorado empties into the Gulf about 75 miles (120 km) south of Yuma. Occasionally the International Boundary and Water Commission allows a springtime pulse flow to recharge the delta.

Before 20th-century development dewatered the lower Colorado, a major tidal bore was present in the delta and estuary; the first historical record was made by the Croatian missionary in Spanish service Father Ferdinand Konščak on July 18, 1746. During spring tide conditions, the tidal bore—locally called El Burro—formed in the estuary about Montague Island in Baja California and propagated upstream.

=== Major tributaries ===
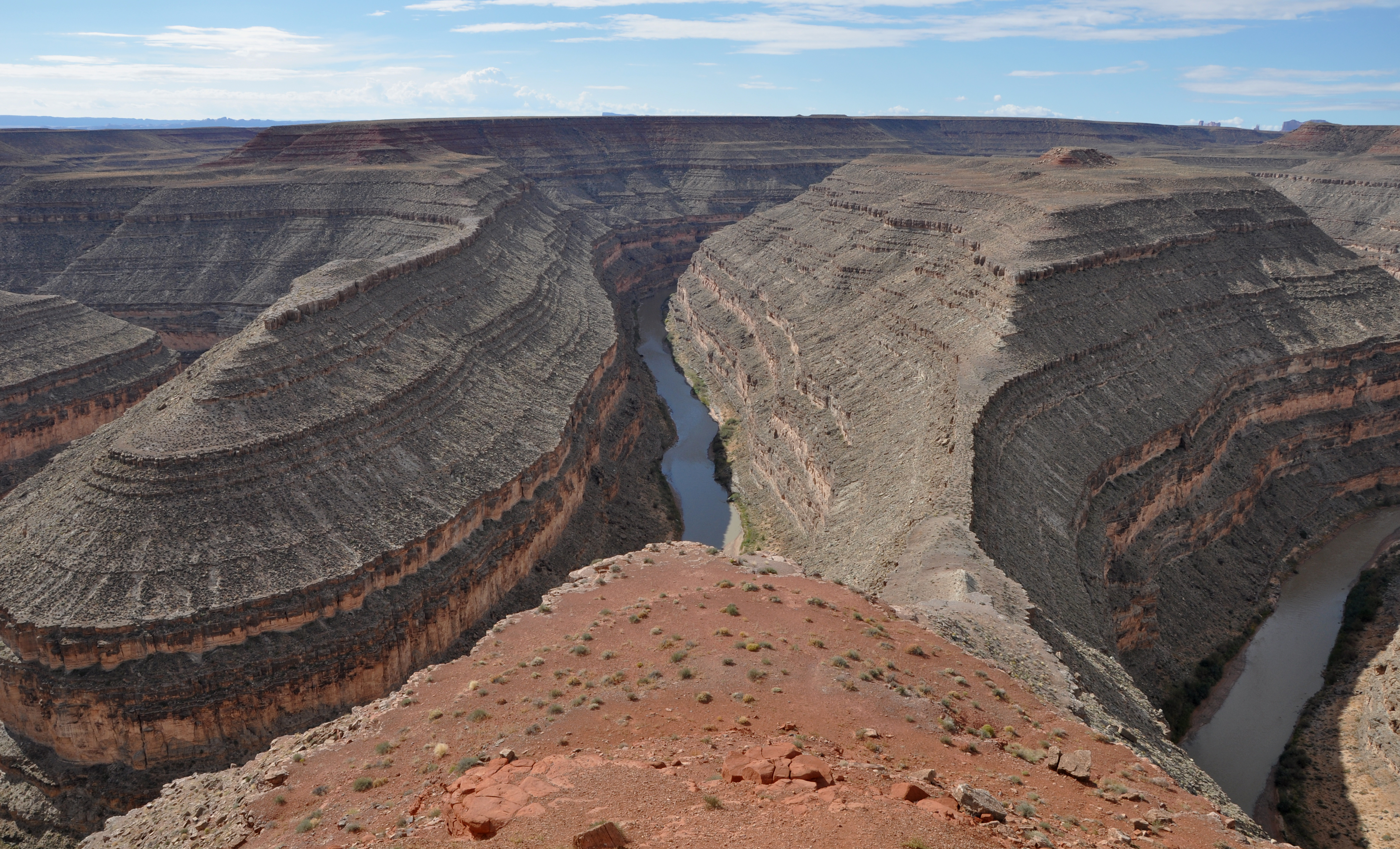
The San Juan River near Mexican Hat, Utah

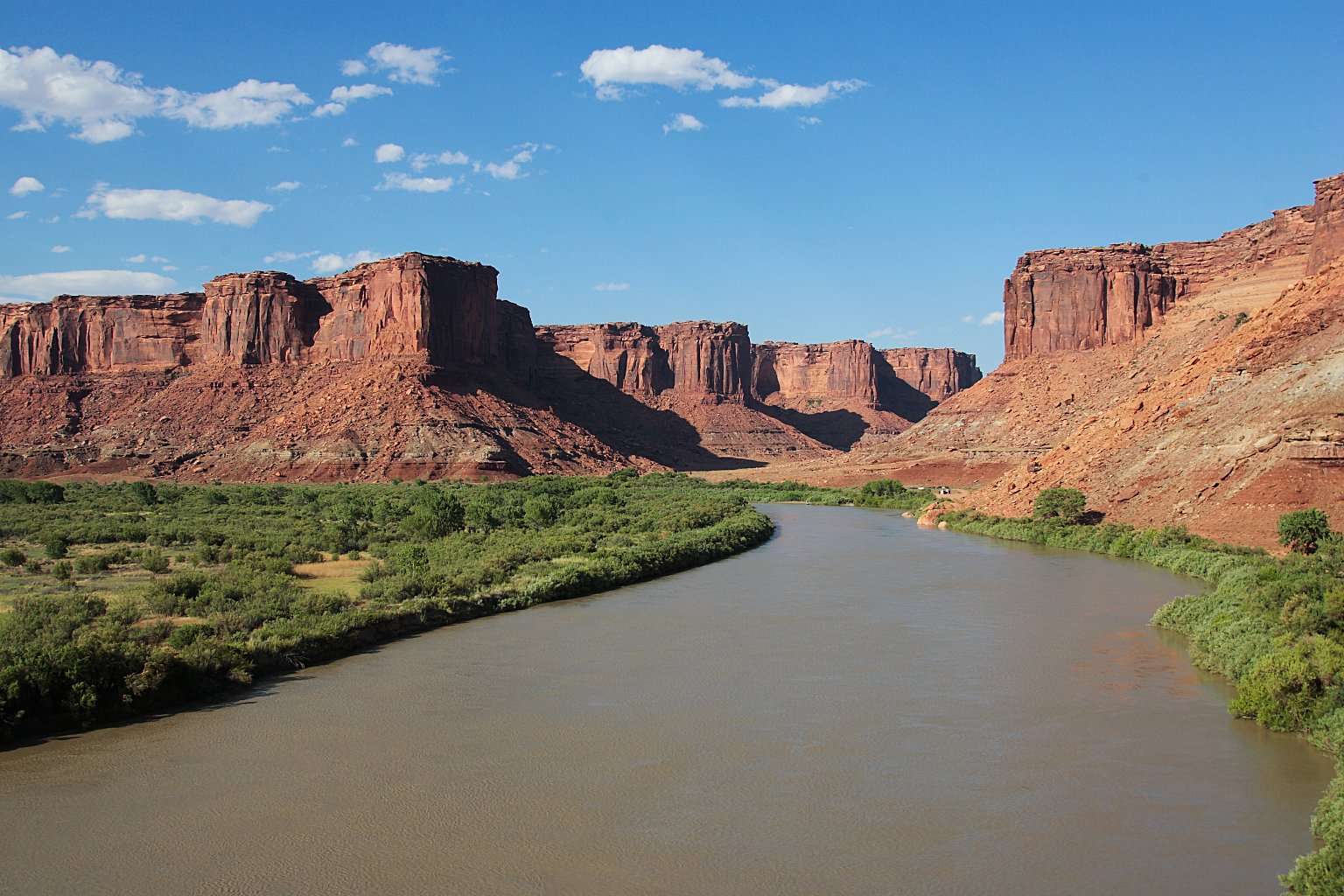
The Green River at Mineral Bottom, just north of Canyonlands National Park

The Colorado is joined by over 25 significant tributaries, of which the Green River is the largest by both length and discharge. The Green River takes drainage from the Wind River Range of west-central Wyoming, from Utah's Uinta Mountains, and from the Rockies of northwestern Colorado. The Gila River is the second longest and drains a greater area than the Green, but has a significantly lower flow because of a more arid climate and larger diversions for irrigation and cities. Both the Gunnison and San Juan rivers, which derive most of their water from Rocky Mountains snowmelt, contribute more water than the Gila contributed naturally.

Statistics of the Colorado's longest tributaries
Name	State	Length		Watershed		Discharge		References
		mi	km	mi^{2}	km^{2}	cfs	m^{3}/s	
Green River	Utah	730	1,170	48,100	125,000	6,048	171.3	(Note: Discharge data is for Green River, Utah, 117.6 miles (189.3 km) upstream from the mouth. The stream gauge here measures flow from an area of 44,850 square miles (116,200 km^{2}), representing about 93.2 percent of the basin.)
Gila River	Arizona	649	1,044	58,200	151,000	247	7.0	(Note: Before large irrigation and municipal diversions, the Gila River discharged about 1.3 million acre-feet (1.6 km^{3}) per year, which equals a flow of nearly 2,000 cubic feet per second (57 m^{3}/s).)
San Juan River	Utah	383	616	24,600	64,000	2,192	62.1	(Note: Discharge data is for Bluff, Utah, located about 113.5 miles (182.7 km) above the confluence with the Colorado. The gauge measures flow from an area of 23,000 square miles (60,000 km^{2}), about 93.5 percent of the basin.)
Little Colorado River	Arizona	356	573	26,500	69,000	424	12.0	
Dolores River	Utah	250	400	4,574	11,850	633	17.9	
Gunnison River	Colorado	164	264	7,930	20,500	2,570	73	
Virgin River	Nevada	160	260	13,020	33,700	239	6.8	(Note: Discharge data is for Littlefield, Arizona, about 66 miles (106 km) from the confluence with the Colorado, and also upstream of the confluence with its major tributary, the Muddy River. The gauge measures flow from an area of 5,090 square miles (13,200 km^{2}), about 39.1 percent of the total basin.)

== Drainage basin ==
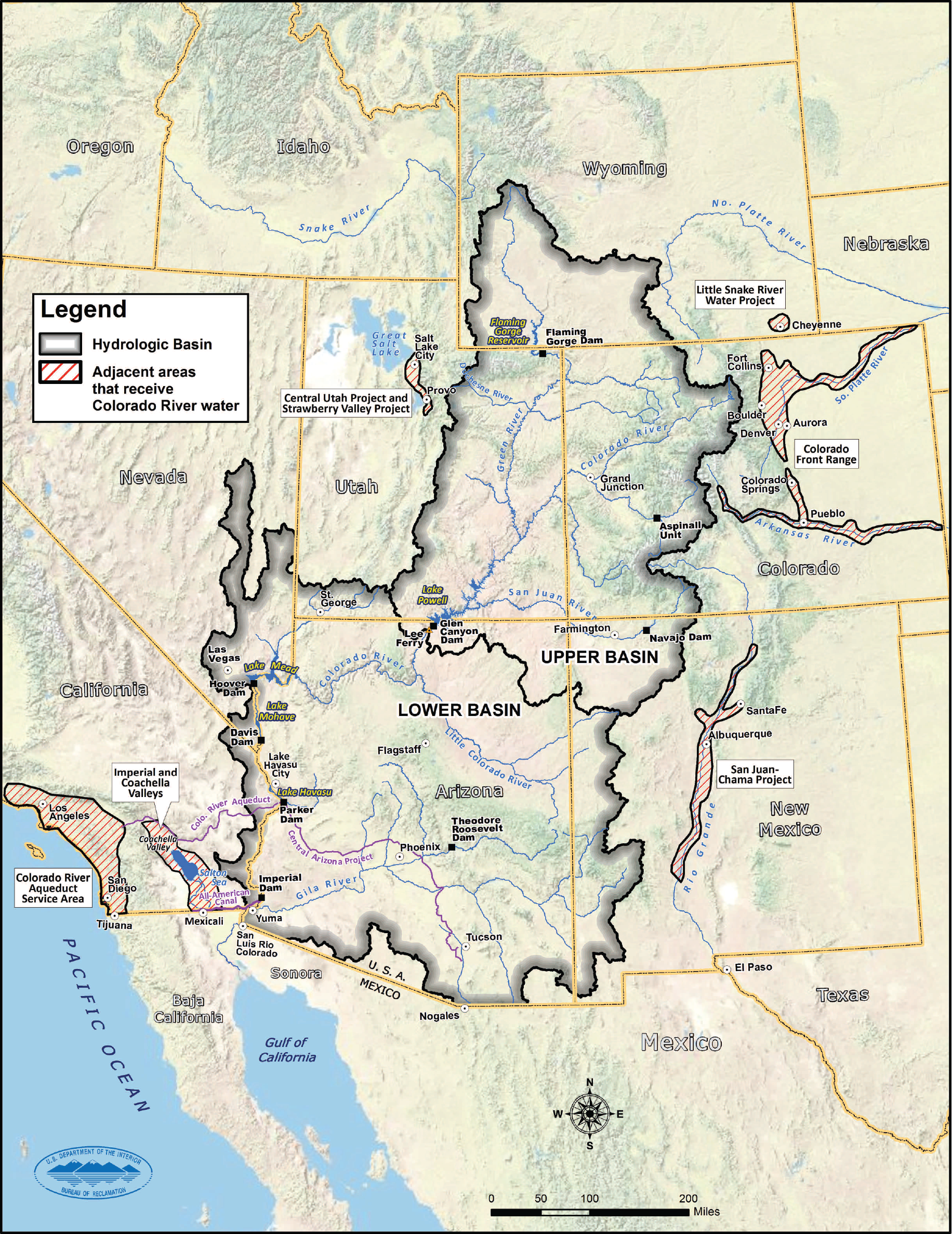
A map showing the Upper and Lower Colorado River Basin, and adjacent areas supplied by Colorado River water.

The Colorado River Basin consists of 246,000 square miles (640,000 km^{2}), making it the seventh largest drainage basin in North America. About 238,600 square miles (618,000 km^{2}), or 97 percent of the basin, is in the United States. The basin extends into western Colorado and New Mexico, southwestern Wyoming, eastern and southern Utah, southeastern Nevada and California, and most of Arizona. The areas drained within Baja California and Sonora in Mexico are very small and do not contribute significant runoff.

Aside from the Colorado River Delta, the basin extends into Sonora at a few locations further east, including the headwaters of the Santa Cruz River and San Pedro River (both tributaries of the Gila River). For hydrological management purposes, the Colorado River Basin is divided into the Upper Basin (the drainage area above Lees Ferry), and the Lower Basin. The Upper Basin covers only 45 percent of the land area of the Colorado River Basin, but contributes 92 percent of the runoff.

The entire eastern boundary of the Colorado River Basin runs along the North American Continental Divide and is defined largely by the Rocky Mountains and the Rio Grande Basin. The Wind River Range in Wyoming marks the northern extent of the basin, and is separated from the Colorado Rockies by the endorheic Great Divide Basin in southwestern Wyoming. Streams that are nearby the east side of the divide drain into the Mississippi River and Rio Grande, while nearby areas north of the Wind River Range drain into the Columbia River.

The western boundary of the Colorado River Basin is formed by ranges and plateaus that border the Great Basin, including the Uinta Mountains and Wasatch Range. Major Great Basin watersheds bordering the Colorado River Basin are the Great Salt Lake and Sevier Lake watersheds. To the south, the Colorado River Basin borders several watersheds in Mexico draining into the Gulf of California, including the Sonoyta, Concepción, and Yaqui rivers.

Much of the basin is at high elevation; the mean elevation is 5,500 feet (1,700 m). Lees Ferry, more than halfway along the Colorado River from its source, is 3,150 feet (960 m) above sea level. The highest point in the Colorado River Basin is 14,321-foot (4,365 m) Uncompahgre Peak in Colorado's San Juan Mountains, while some water from the river drains via irrigation run-off into California's Salton Sea, 236 feet (72 m) below sea level.

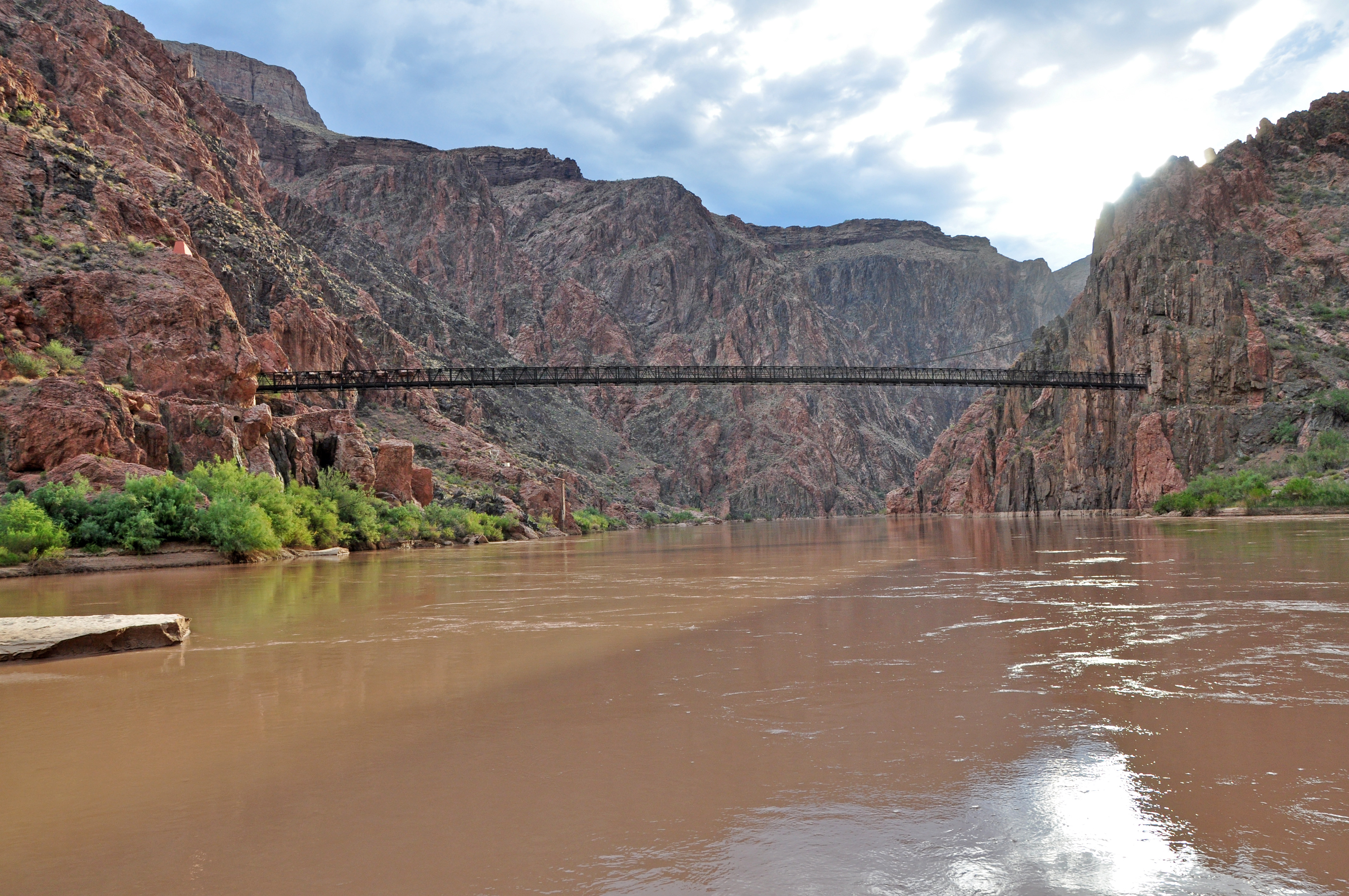
The Black Suspension Bridge crosses the Colorado River in the Grand Canyon at Phantom Ranch, Arizona.

About 72 percent of the Colorado River Basin is classified as arid, with the Sonoran and Mojave deserts covering the southern portion and the Colorado Plateau encompassing much of the central portion. The Colorado Plateau is home to most of the major canyon systems formed by the Colorado River and its tributaries, particularly those of the Green and San Juan rivers. About 23 percent of the basin is forest, with the largest area in the Rocky Mountains; other significant forested areas include the Kaibab, Aquarius, and Markagunt plateaus in southern Utah and northern Arizona, and the Mogollon Rim in central Arizona.

These high plateaus and escarpments, often exceeding 9,000 feet (2,700 m) in elevation, form the northern and southern edges of the Colorado Plateau geological province. Developed land use in the basin is mostly irrigated agriculture, chiefly in the Grand Valley, the Lower Colorado River Valley, and the Salt River Valley, but the total area of crop and pasture land is only 2–3 percent of the entire basin. Urban areas cover less than 1 percent.

Climate in the Colorado River Basin ranges from subtropical hot desert at southern, lower elevations to alpine in the Rocky Mountains. Mean monthly high temperatures are 25.3 °C (77.5 °F) in the Upper Basin and 33.4 °C (92.1 °F) in the Lower Basin, and lows average −3.6 and 8.9 °C (25.5 and 48.0 °F), respectively. Annual precipitation averages 6.5 inches (164 mm), ranging from over 60 inches (1,500 mm) in some areas of the Rockies to less than 4 inches (100 mm) in dry desert valleys. The Upper Basin generally receives snow and rain during the winter and early spring, while precipitation in the Lower Basin falls mainly during intense but infrequent summer thunderstorms brought on by the North American Monsoon.

Precipitation is influenced by the El Niño-Southern Oscillation (ENSO) with El Niño being associated with wetter conditions and La Niña with drier conditions. The effect of ENSO is significantly more pronounced in the Lower Basin, where it has a strong impact on monsoonal rainfall. Runoff patterns across the Colorado River Basin reflect this. Most of the perennial tributaries originate in the Upper Basin. Tributaries in the Lower Basin are either ephemeral (such as the Little Colorado River) or highly seasonal (such as the Gila and Salt rivers).

In 2010, approximately 13 million people lived within the Colorado River basin, (Note: American population (9.7 million) calculated from statistics from the U.S. Census Bureau and the State of Colorado. The population in Mexico is about 3 million.) while about 40 million people lived in areas supplied by Colorado River water. Colorado River basin states are among the fastest-growing in the US; the population of Nevada alone increased by about 66 percent between 1990 and 2000, while Arizona grew by some 40 percent. Phoenix, Arizona, Las Vegas, Nevada and Mexicali, Baja California are the largest cities by population within the Colorado River Basin. Other significant cities include Tucson, Arizona, St. George, Utah and Flagstaff, Arizona. Due to the rugged and inhospitable topography through which the river flows, there are only a few major towns along the Colorado River itself, including Grand Junction, Colorado and Yuma, Arizona.

== Discharge ==
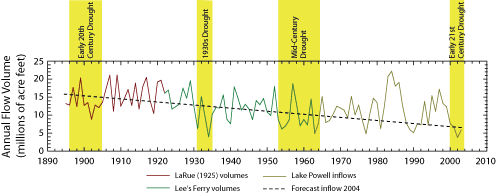
The annual Colorado River discharge volumes at Lee's Ferry between 1895 and 2004

The unimpaired annual runoff (Note: Unimpaired runoff figures published by the Bureau of Reclamation are an estimate of unregulated river flow without any upstream water consumption.) of the Colorado River at Lees Ferry, Arizona is estimated at 14.7 million acre-feet (18.1 km^{3}), or an annualized discharge of 20,300 cu ft/s (570 m^{3}/s), for the 1906–2023 period. River flows at the Lees Ferry stream gauge, about halfway along the length of the Colorado and 16 miles (26 km) below Glen Canyon Dam, are used to determine water allocations in the Colorado River basin. Flows originating above Lees Ferry represent the majority of Colorado River runoff. Tributaries between there and Imperial Dam near the US–Mexico border contribute a further 1.1 million acre-feet (1.4 km^{3}), and the Gila–Salt River system historically accounted for another 1.7 million acre-feet (2.1 km^{3}). While much of this water was lost to evaporation in the deserts of the Lower Basin, anywhere from 10 to 20 million acre-feet (12 to 25 km^{3}) per year reached the Colorado River Delta prior to the early 20th century.

Up to 90 percent of the river's flow originates as snowmelt from the Rocky Mountains and other smaller mountain ranges of the Colorado Plateau. Natural seasonal flows at its mouth varied widely, often exceeding 100,000 cu ft/s (2,800 m^{3}/s) in the spring melt and falling as low as 2,500 cu ft/s (71 m^{3}/s) in winter. Snowmelt typically begins in April, peaks in May or June, and can extend into August in wet years. Monsoon rainstorms often occur in the Lower Basin from August through October, contributing much of the flow in tributaries below Lees Ferry and often causing flash flooding.

Since the initial closure of Hoover Dam in 1934, lower Colorado River flows have been greatly moderated, with monthly means below the dam ranging from 16,400 cu ft/s (460 m^{3}/s) in May to 11,200 cu ft/s (320 m^{3}/s) in October. Upstream of the massive Hoover and Glen Canyon Dams, inflows to Lake Powell still experience distinct spring highs and winter lows, though overall volumes have been reduced due to Upper Basin water diversions. Flow regimes in a few Upper Basin tributaries, such as the Yampa River, remain almost completely unaltered.

By the 1950s, the Colorado delta was regularly drying up in fall and winter, though spring high flows often still made it to the ocean. After the initial closure of Glen Canyon Dam in 1963, these seasonal flows were almost eliminated, with the exception of a few very wet years, such as 1983–1987. In 1984, 16.5 million acre-feet (20.4 km^{3}) of excess runoff reached the ocean. Flows have further declined due to evaporation from reservoirs and, particularly after 2000, reduced snowpack with warming winter temperatures in the Rockies.

Water diversions have effectively removed some tributaries entirely, including the Gila River, once the Colorado's largest tributary below Lees Ferry. Most Colorado River water is diverted in the United States, with only about 2.8 million acre-feet (3.5 km^{3}) per year reaching Mexico since 1950. At Morelos Dam, the remaining flow is diverted to irrigate the Mexicali Valley, leaving the Colorado River Delta almost entirely dry except for small amounts of agricultural wastewater.

Discharge of the Colorado River at selected stream gauges
Location	Annual mean discharge		Maximum peak flow		Drainage area		Period of record	Source
Location	cfs	m^{3}/s	cfs	m^{3}/s	mi^{2}	km^{2}	Period of record	Source
Grand Lake, CO	65.5	1.85	1,870	53	63.8	165	1953–2020	
Dotsero, CO	2,079	58.9	22,200	630	4,390	11,400	1941–2020	
Cisco, UT	7,048	199.6	76,800	2,170	24,100	62,000	1914–2020	
Lee's Ferry, AZ	14,600	410	127,000	3,600	111,800	290,000	1922–2020	
Davis Dam, AZ–NV	13,740	389	46,200	1,310	173,300	449,000	1905–2020	
Parker Dam, AZ–CA	11,630	329	42,400	1,200	182,700	473,000	1935–2020	
Laguna Dam, AZ–CA	1,448	41.0	30,900	870	188,600	488,000	1972–2020	
NIB (Note: NIB = "Northerly International Boundary", or the point at which the Colorado begins to form the Mexico–U.S. border, south of Yuma. Also note that the SIB ("Southerly International Boundary") is the point at which the Colorado ceases to form the border and passes entirely into Mexico.) (near Andrade, CA)	3,869	109.6	40,600	1,150	246,700	639,000	1950–2020	

Monthly discharge of the Colorado at Lee's Ferry, before and after construction of Glen Canyon Dam
Month		Jan.	Feb.	Mar.	Apr.	May	Jun.	Jul.	Aug.	Sep.	Oct.	Nov.	Dec.
Pre-dam discharge (1921–1962)	cfs	5,260	6,720	9,250	19,900	44,200	52,400	21,200	10,400	8,280	8,220	7,450	5,850
Pre-dam discharge (1921–1962)	m^{3}/s	149	190	262	564	1,252	1,484	600	294	234	233	211	166
Post-dam discharge (1963–2021)	cfs	13,400	12,300	11,500	12,400	13,700	15,600	15,700	15,400	12,700	10,500	11,600	12,600
Post-dam discharge (1963–2021)	m^{3}/s	379	348	326	351	388	442	445	436	360	297	328	357

== Geology ==
As recently as the Cretaceous period about 100 million years ago, much of western North America was still part of the Pacific Ocean. Tectonic forces from the collision of the Farallon Plate with the North American Plate pushed up the Rocky Mountains between 50 and 75 million years ago in a mountain-building episode known as the Laramide orogeny. The Colorado River first formed as a west-flowing stream draining the southwestern portion of the range, and the uplift also diverted the Green River, once a tributary of the Mississippi River, west towards the Colorado.

About 30 to 20 million years ago, volcanic activity related to the orogeny led to the Mid-Tertiary ignimbrite flare-up, which created smaller formations such as the Chiricahua Mountains in Arizona and deposited massive amounts of volcanic ash and debris over the watershed. The Colorado Plateau first began to rise during the Eocene, between about 55 and 34 million years ago, but did not attain its present height until about 5 million years ago, about when the Colorado River established its present course into the Gulf of California.

The time scale and sequence over which the river's present course and the Grand Canyon were formed is uncertain. Before the Gulf of California was formed around 12 to 5 million years ago by faulting processes along the boundary of the North American and Pacific plates, the Colorado flowed west to an outlet on the Pacific Ocean—possibly Monterey Bay on the Central California coast, and may have played a role in the formation of the Monterey submarine canyon. Crustal extension in the Basin and Range Province began about 20 million years ago and the modern Sierra Nevada began forming about 10 million years ago, eventually diverting the Colorado southwards towards the Gulf. As the Colorado Plateau continued to rise between 5 and 2.5 million years ago, the river maintained its ancestral course, as an antecedent stream, and began to cut the Grand Canyon. Antecedence played a major part in shaping other peculiar geographic features in the watershed, including the Dolores River's bisection of Paradox Valley in Colorado and the Green River's cut through the Uinta Mountains in Utah.

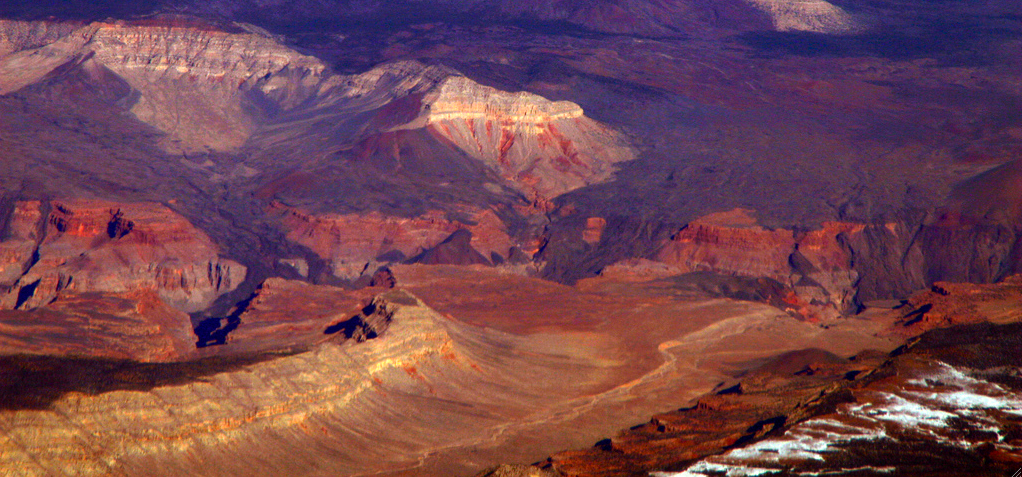
Remnants of basalt flows from the Uinkaret volcanic field are seen here descending into the Grand Canyon, where they dammed the Colorado over 10 times in the past 2 million years.

Sediments carried from the plateau by the Colorado River created a vast delta made of more than 10,000 cubic miles (42,000 km^{3}) of material that walled off the northernmost part of the gulf in approximately 1 million years. Cut off from the ocean, the portion of the gulf north of the delta eventually evaporated and formed the Salton Sink, which reached about 260 feet (79 m) below sea level. Since then the river has changed course into the Salton Sink at least three times, transforming it into Lake Cahuilla, which at maximum size flooded up the valley to present-day Indio, California. The lake took about 50 years to evaporate after the Colorado resumed flowing to the Gulf. The present-day Salton Sea can be considered the most recent incarnation of Lake Cahuilla, though on a much smaller scale.

Between 1.8 million and 10,000 years ago, massive flows of basalt from the Uinkaret volcanic field in northern Arizona dammed the Colorado River within the Grand Canyon. At least 13 lava dams were formed, the largest of which was more than 2,300 feet (700 m) high, backing the river up for nearly 500 miles (800 km) to present-day Moab, Utah. The lack of associated sediment deposits along this stretch of the Colorado River, which would have accumulated in the impounded lakes over time, suggests that most of these dams did not survive for more than a few decades before collapsing or being washed away. Failure of the lava dams caused by erosion, leaks and cavitation caused catastrophic floods, which may have been some of the largest ever to occur in North America, rivaling the Missoula Floods of the late-Pleistocene northwestern United States. Mapping of flood deposits indicate that crests as high as 700 feet (210 m) passed through the Grand Canyon, reaching peak discharges as great as 17 million cubic feet per second (480,000 m^{3}/s).

== History ==
=== Pre-colonial indigenous peoples ===
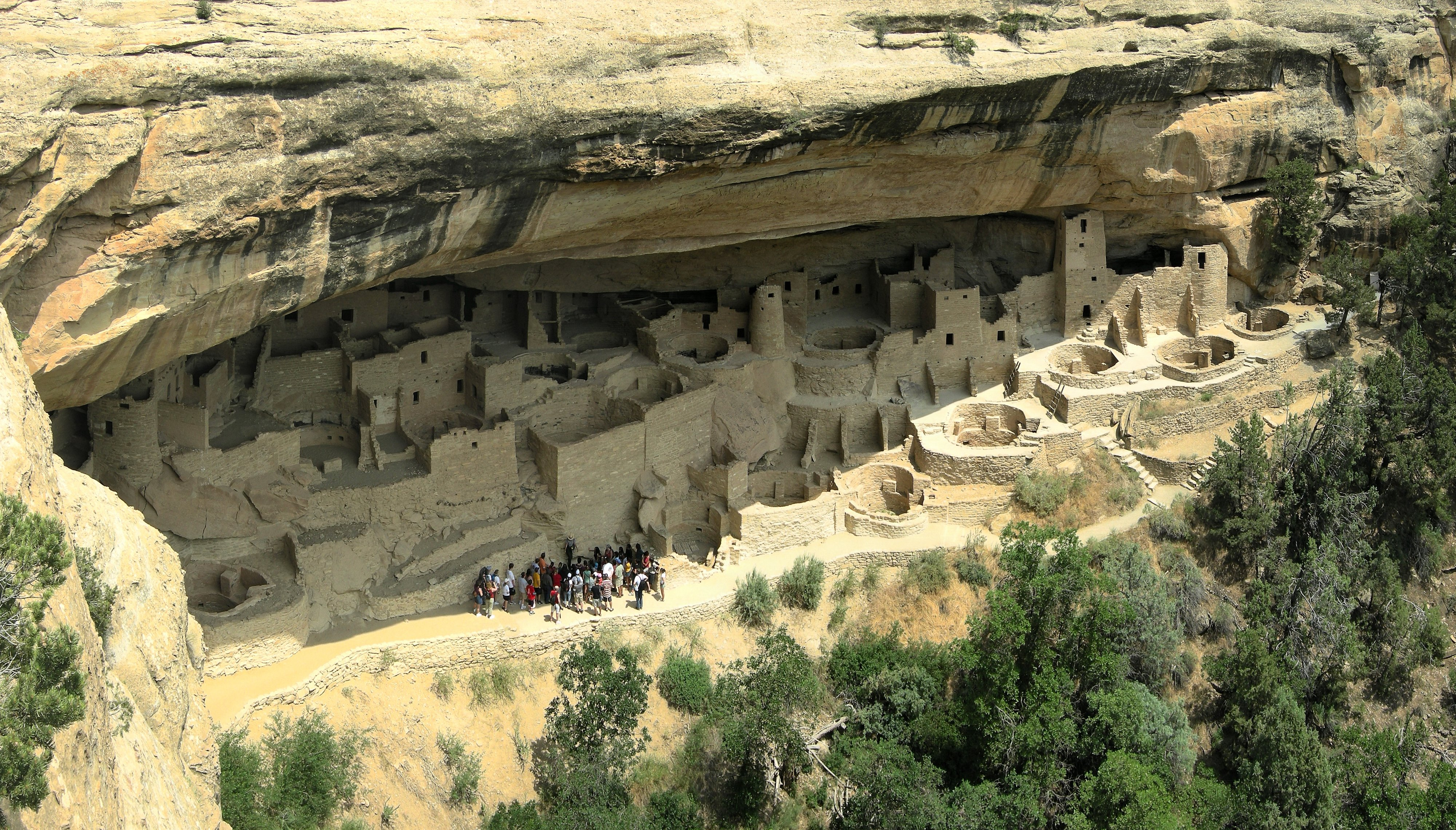
Cliff Palace, Mesa Verde National Park

Small numbers of Paleo-Indians of the Clovis and Folsom cultures inhabited the Colorado Plateau as early as 10,000 BCE, with populations beginning to increase in the Desert Archaic period (6000 BCE–0 CE). While most early inhabitants were hunter-gatherers, evidence of agriculture, masonry dwellings and petroglyphs begins with the Fremont culture period (0–1300 CE). The Ancient Puebloan culture, also known as Anasazi or Hisatsinom, were descended from the Desert Archaic culture and became established in the Four Corners region around 1000 CE.

While there is much evidence of ancient habitation along the Colorado River, including stone dwellings, petroglyphs and pottery in places such as Glen Canyon, the first major agriculture-based societies arose a significant distance from the river. The Puebloan people built many multi-story pueblos or "great houses", and developed complex distribution systems to supply drinking and irrigation water in Chaco Canyon in northwestern New Mexico and Mesa Verde in southwest Colorado. The Hohokam, present in the modern Phoenix area since about 0 CE, experienced prolific growth around 600–700 CE as they constructed a large system of irrigation canals making use of the Salt River. Both civilizations supported large populations at their height, with 6,000–15,000 in Chaco Canyon and as many as 30,000–200,000 Hohokam.

Indigenous names for the Colorado River
Hopi: Pisisvayu
Maricopa: 'Xakxwet
Mohave: 'Aha Kwahwat
Navajo: Tó Ntsʼósíkooh
Havasupai: Ha Ŧay Gʼam /
Sil Gsvgov
Yavapai: ʼHakhwata

Puebloan and Hohokam settlements were abruptly abandoned in the 1400s CE, due both to over-exploitation of natural resources such as timber, and severe drought that made it impossible to maintain irrigation systems. Many Puebloans migrated east to the Rio Grande Valley, while others persisted in smaller settlements on the Colorado Plateau. Puebloan descendants include the Hopi, Zuni, Laguna and Acoma peoples of modern Arizona and New Mexico. O'odham peoples, including the Akimel O'odham (Pima) and Maricopa who continue to live in southern Arizona, are believed to be descended from the Hohokam.

The lower Colorado River valley was inhabited for thousands of years by numerous tribes of the Patayan cultures, many of which belong to the Yuman-Cochimi language group. These include the Walapai, Havasupai and Yavapai in the Grand Canyon region; the Mohave, Halchidhoma, Quechan, and Halyikwamai along the Colorado River between Black Canyon and the Mexican border, and the Cocopah around the Colorado River Delta. The Chemehuevi (a branch of the Southern Paiute) and the Kumeyaay inhabited the desert to the river's west. Those living along the lower Colorado River depended more on fishing and floodplain agriculture than on irrigation, and mostly did not live in permanent settlements. The site of modern-day Yuma has been an important river crossing since ancient times, as the channel here is much narrower compared to the expansive, swampy river bottoms to the north and south, and enabled the expansion of trade to the Pima and Maricopa in the east and coastal California tribes in the west.

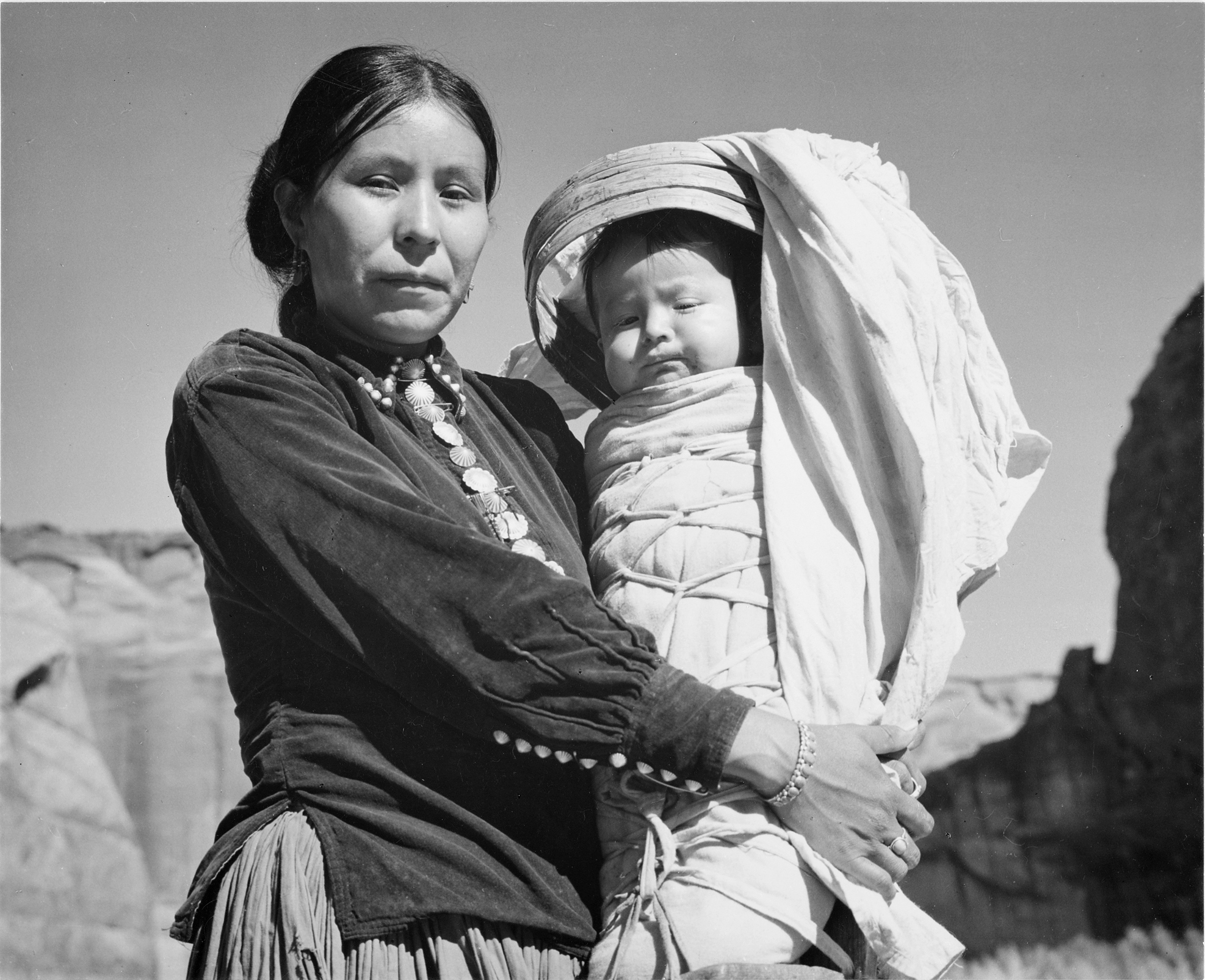
A Navajo woman and child, photographed by Ansel Adams, c. 1944

The Navajo (Diné) began migrating into the Colorado River Basin around 1000–1500 CE, and eventually exercised influence over much of the Colorado Plateau. Originally hunter-gatherers, they acquired knowledge of farming from the Puebloans and adopted a more sedentary lifestyle over time, making extensive use of irrigation in their settlements. The Navajo gradually displaced Hopi settlements as they expanded into northern Arizona after the 1500s. Navajo Mountain and Rainbow Bridge in the Glen Canyon area came to hold particular religious significance for the Navajo, and the nearby confluence of the Colorado and San Juan River is regarded as the birthplace of clouds and rain.

The Ute also became established in the Colorado Plateau around 1500 CE, although they had inhabited more northerly parts of the Colorado basin (modern Wyoming and northern Colorado) since at least 0 CE. They are the first known inhabitants of this part of the Rocky Mountains, and made use of an extensive network of trails crisscrossing the mountains to move between summer and winter camps. The Ute were divided into numerous bands with separate territories but shared a common language and customs.

The Uncompahgre or Tabeguache lived around the confluence of the upper Colorado and Gunnison Rivers, an area including the Grand Mesa. The Weenuchiu lived along the San Juan River, and the Parianuche and Yamparika lived in the Yampa, White and Duchesne River valleys. The Ute ranged as far as the river's headwaters. One Ute story recounts a battle with the Arapaho at Grand Lake, which they believe still hosts the spirits of the deceased.

=== Spanish exploration and early settlement ===
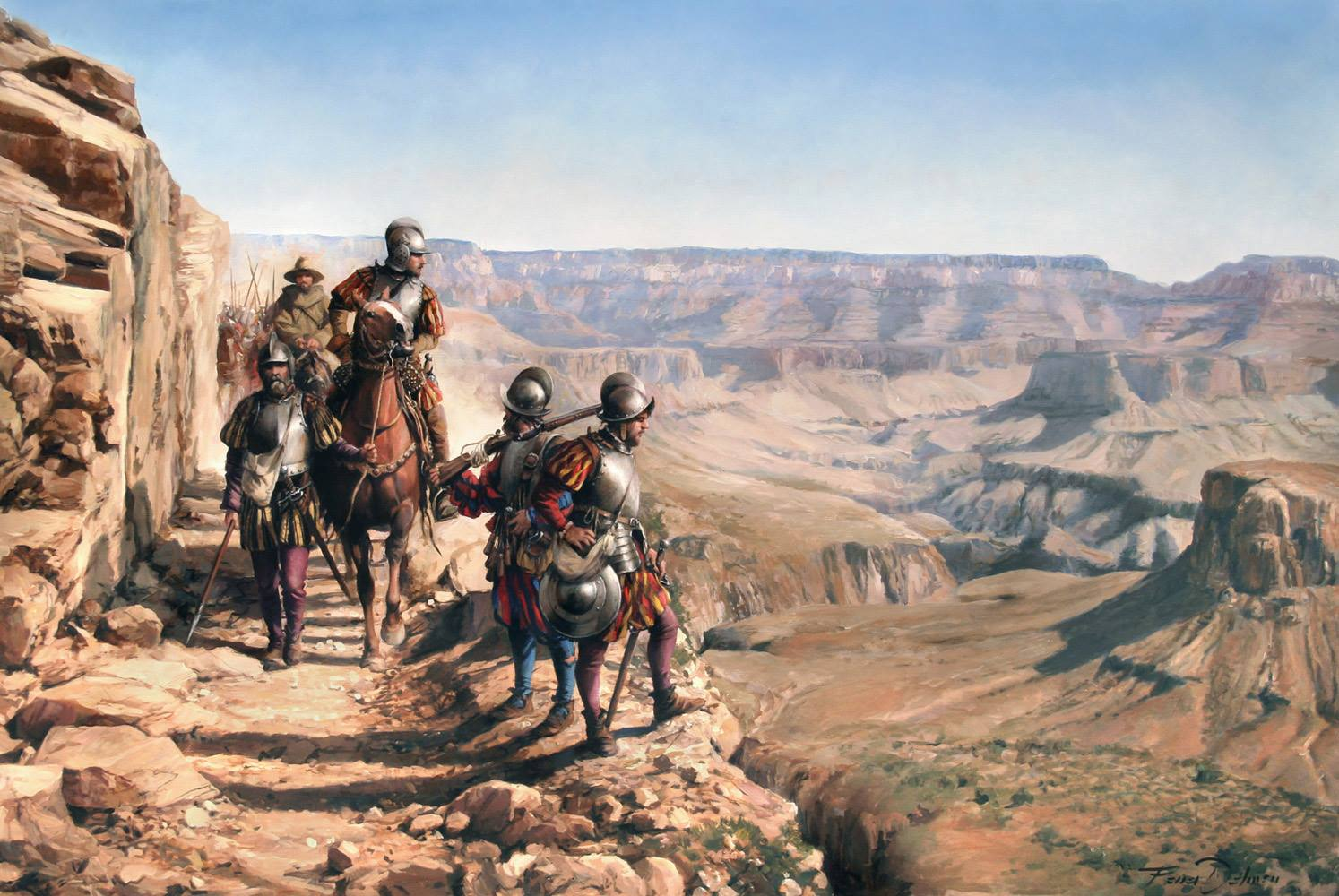
La conquista del Colorado (2017), by Augusto Ferrer-Dalmau, depicts Francisco Vázquez de Coronado's 1540–1542 expedition. García López de Cárdenas can be seen overlooking the Grand Canyon.

Starting in the 1500s, the Spanish began to explore and colonize western North America. Francisco de Ulloa may have been the first European to see the river, when in 1536 he sailed to the head of the Gulf of California. In 1540 García López de Cárdenas became the first European to see the Grand Canyon, during Coronado's expedition to find the Seven Cities of Gold ("Cibola"). Cárdenas was apparently unimpressed with the canyon, greatly underestimating its size, and left in disappointment with no gold to be found. In the same year Melchior Díaz explored the Colorado River's delta and named it Rio del Tizon ("fire brand river"), after seeing a practice used by the local people for warming themselves.

By the late 1500s or early 1600s, the Utes had acquired horses from the Spanish, and their use for hunting, trade and warfare soon became widespread among Utes and Navajo in the Colorado River basin. This conferred them a military advantage over Goshutes and Southern Paiutes that were slower to adopt horses. The Navajo also adopted a culture of livestock herding as they acquired sheep and goats from the Spanish. Juan Bautista de Anza in 1774 was the first Spaniard to reach Yuma Crossing, where he established friendly relations with the Quechan people and opened the Anza trail between Arizona and the California coast.

The Spanish soon founded Mission Puerto de Purisima Concepcion and Mission San Pedro y San Pablo de Bicuner along the lower Colorado River. Spanish attempts to control the crossing led to the 1781 Yuma revolt, in which over 100 soldiers and colonists were killed, and the settlements were abandoned. The Quechan blocked foreigners' use of the crossing until the arrival of American mountain men and fur trappers in the 1820s.

The name Rio Colorado first appears in 1701, on the map "Paso por Tierra a la California" published by missionary Eusebio Kino, who also determined during that time that Baja California was a peninsula, not an island as previously believed. In the 1700s and early 1800s many Spanish and American explorers believed in the existence of a Buenaventura River that ran from the Rocky Mountains to the Pacific coast. In 1776, Silvestre Vélez de Escalante attached this name to the upper Green River, and a number of later maps showed this connecting to Lake Timpanogos, now Utah Lake, and flowing west to California. The Dominguez–Escalante expedition first reached the Colorado River near the junction with the Dolores River, naming the larger river "Rio San Rafael". They later forded the Colorado in southeastern Utah at Crossing of the Fathers, now submerged in Lake Powell.

=== American exploration ===
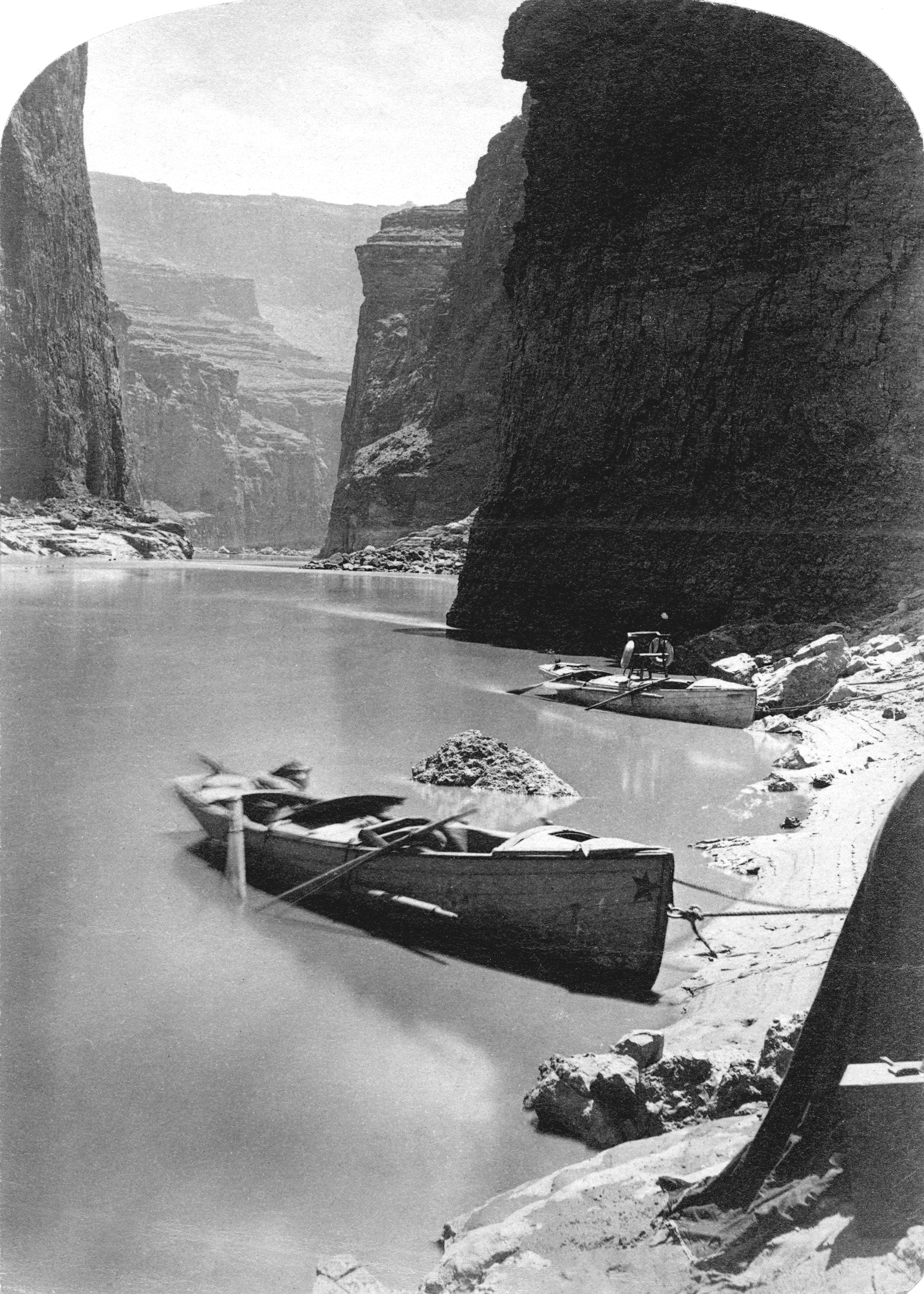
Boats of John Wesley Powell's second Colorado River expedition in Marble Canyon, 1872.

In the 1820s, American fur trappers along the upper Green River in Wyoming (known to them as the "Seedskeedee" or variants thereof), seeking a route to export furs to the coast, surmised that this and what the Spanish called the Colorado were in fact connected. William H. Ashley made an unsuccessful attempt to navigate from the Green River to the Colorado's mouth in 1825. In 1826, Jedediah Smith arrived at the lower Colorado River, referring to it as the Seedskeedee, and proceeded upstream, exploring as far as Black Canyon. In the 1830s, fur trappers from Wyoming made it as far downstream as Cataract Canyon and Glen Canyon, but none were able to navigate the full length of the river. In 1843 John C. Frémont explored the Great Basin and conclusively determined no Buenaventura River flowed west to California; thus, the direction of river flow must be southwest.

By the early 19th century, the stretch of the Colorado above the confluence of the Green River at Cataract Canyon, Utah, became known to fur trappers as the "Grand River", though the exact origin of this name is unknown. The Grand River above the confluence with the Gunnison River was also called the Bunkara River, the Blue River, or the North Fork of the Grand River until the 1870s. By the early 1900s the name "Grand River" had been attached to the entire stream as far as Grand Lake, which was then considered its official source. Although the Grand River was renamed the Colorado in 1921, its name survives in numerous places such as Grand County and Grand Junction, Colorado.

In 1848, the U.S. Army established Fort Yuma, creating the first permanent U.S. settlement along the river. This served as a military garrison and supply point for settlers headed to California along the Southern Emigrant Trail. Due to the arduous task of ferrying supplies overland, the schooner Invincible attempted to bring supplies up the river but was thwarted by the delta's strong tides. Steamboats were brought to the river, starting in 1852 with the sidewheeler Uncle Sam, whose first voyage from the Gulf to Yuma took fifteen days.

Exploration by steamboat soon advanced upriver. In 1857, George A. Johnson in the General Jesup was able to reach Pyramid Canyon, over 300 miles (480 km) north of Fort Yuma. He was followed by Lt. Joseph Christmas Ives who used a specially built shallow-draft steamboat, Explorer, to reach Black Canyon, where Hoover Dam stands today. Having set out to determine the river's suitability as a navigation route, Ives remarked: "Ours has been the first, and will doubtless be the last, party of whites to visit this profitless locality. It seems intended by nature that the Colorado River, along the greater portion of its lonely and majestic way, shall be forever unvisited and undisturbed."

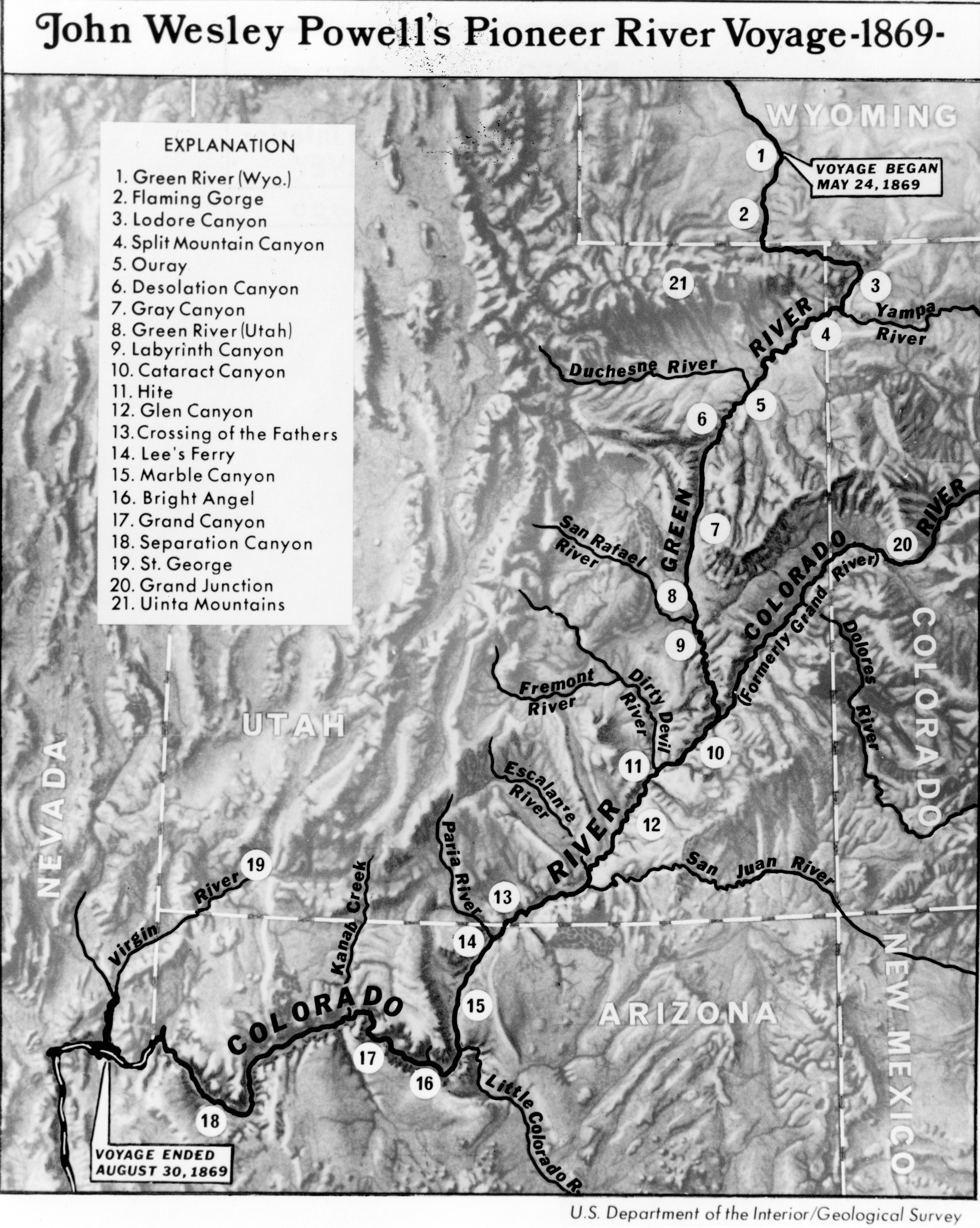
The route of Powell's first expedition, 1869.

The last part of the Colorado River to be surveyed was the Grand Canyon itself. In 1869, John Wesley Powell with nine men set out on an expedition from Green River Station, Wyoming. They were the first party of non-natives to travel the length of the Grand Canyon, and the first to successfully travel by boat from the upper Green River to the lower Colorado. Powell led a second expedition in 1871, with financial backing from the U.S. government, and continued to conduct geographical and botanical surveys across the region until the 1890s. Another Grand Canyon river expedition was led in 1889–1890 by Robert Brewster Stanton to survey a route for a proposed railroad through the canyon, which was never built.

We are now ready to start on our way down the Great Unknown. Our boats, tied to a common stake, are chafing each other, as they are tossed by the fretful river. They ride high and buoyant, for their loads are lighter than we could desire. We have but a month's rations remaining… The lighting of the boats has this advantage: they will ride the waves better, and we shall have little to carry when we make a portage.

We are three-quarters of a mile in the depths of the earth, and the great river shrinks into insignificance, as it dashes its angry waves against the walls and cliffs, that rise to the world above; they are but puny ripples, and we but pigmies, running up and down the sands, or lost among the boulders.

We have an unknown distance yet to run; an unknown river yet to explore. What falls there are, we know not; what rocks beset the channel, we know not; what walls rise over the river, we know not; Ah, well! we may conjecture many things. The men talk as cheerfully as ever; jests are bandied about freely this morning; but to me the cheer is somber and the jests are ghastly.

— John Wesley Powell's journal, August 1869

=== U.S. westward expansion and military campaigns ===
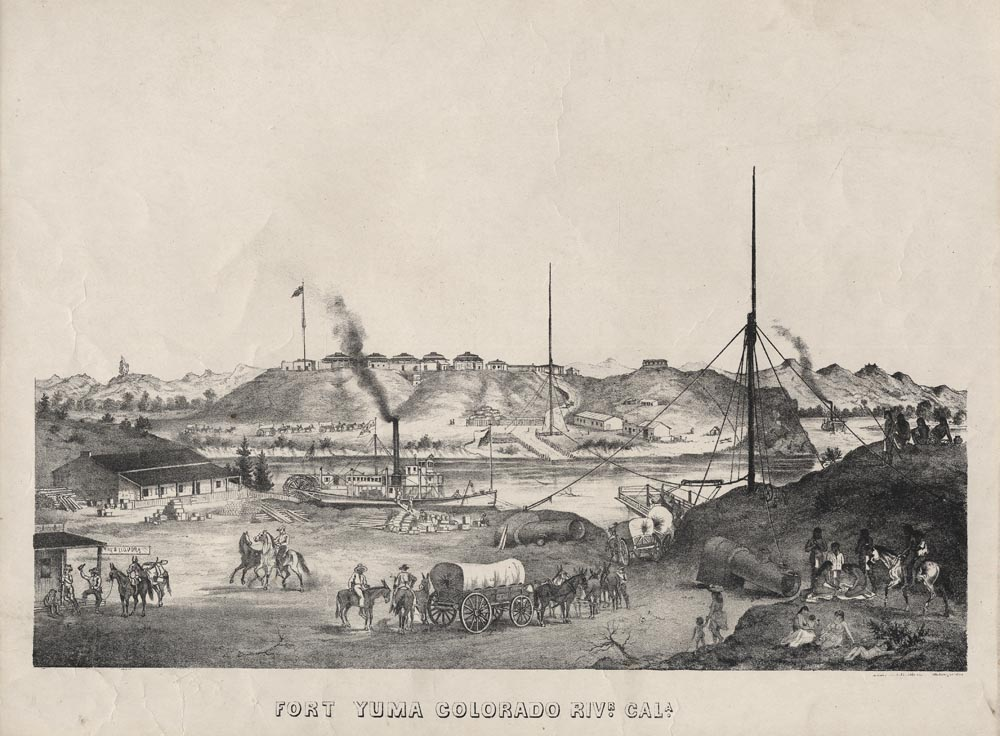
A lithograph of Fort Yuma, c. 1875

In 1858, gold was discovered on the Gila River east of Yuma, then along the Colorado River at El Dorado Canyon, Nevada and La Paz, Arizona. As prospectors and settlers entered the region, they became involved in skirmishes with the Mohave, spurring U.S. Army expeditions that culminated in the 1859 Battle of the Colorado River which concluded the Mohave War. In the 1870s the Mohave were moved to the Fort Mohave and Colorado River reservations. Chemehuevi and later some Hopi and Navajo peoples were also moved to the Colorado River reservation, where they today form the Colorado River Indian Tribes.

As the American frontier expanded into the Colorado Plateau, an effort to expel the Navajo from the Four Corners region was begun by General James Henry Carleton, who in 1864 enlisted mountain man Kit Carson to lead a campaign against the Navajo. Carson, with the help of the Navajo's Ute enemies, captured more than 8,000 Navajo and forcibly marched them to Fort Sumner, New Mexico. Hundreds died during what is now known as the Long Walk and while enduring appalling conditions at Fort Sumner. After the failure of the Army to maintain the reservation there, the Treaty of Bosque Redondo established the Navajo Nation in the Four Corners, where the Navajo were allowed to return in 1868.

Gold and silver were also discovered in the Upper Basin, beginning with the 1859 Blue River strike that led to the founding of Breckenridge, Colorado. Up until the 1860s, southwestern Colorado had remained relatively untouched by U.S. westward expansion, as the Americans had recognized Ute sovereignty by treaty. Following the 1861 carving out of Colorado Territory and further mineral strikes including Ouray and Telluride, Ute leaders were coerced into signing the 1873 Brunot Agreement, in which they lost rights to most of their land. A flood of mineral prospecting and settlement ensued in western Colorado.

By 1881, the Army had driven out the remaining pockets of Ute resistance on the Western Slope, officially opening the Grand River country to settlement. In 1882, the town of Grand Junction was incorporated. The Denver and Rio Grande Western Railroad (D&RGW) quickly expanded into this area to serve mining boomtowns, crossing the Rockies to the south via the Black Canyon of the Gunnison River. By 1883 the railroad had reached Grand Junction, and a spur up the Colorado to Glenwood Springs was completed in 1887.

In Arizona and Utah Territories, many early settlers were Mormons fleeing religious persecution in the Midwest. Mormons founded agricultural colonies at Fort Santa Clara in 1855 and St. Thomas, now flooded under Lake Mead, in 1865. Stone's Ferry, crossing the Colorado at the mouth of the Virgin River, enabled shipping of their produce by wagon to gold mining districts further south. Although the Mormons abandoned St. Thomas in 1871, a salt-mining industry persisted here, and steamboats operated up to nearby Rioville into the 1880s. In 1879 a group of Mormon settlers made their way to southeastern Utah, blasting the precarious Hole in the Rock Trail to cross the Colorado River at Glen Canyon, subsequently establishing the community of Bluff. Due to the dry climate, these settlements depended heavily on irrigation. In central Arizona, settlers uncovered and re-established canals previously used by the Hohokam.

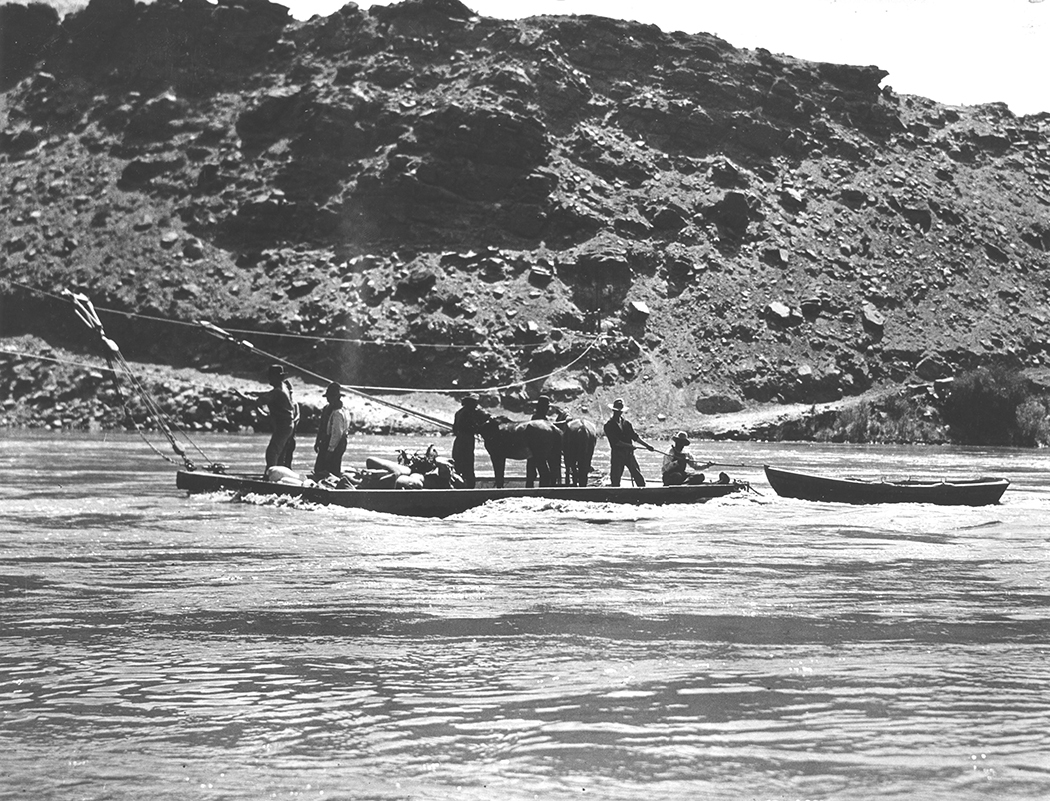
A historic photograph of the cable ferry at Lee's Ferry, prior to construction of the Navajo Bridge.

Following tensions between Mormon settlers and the U.S. government in the Utah War, a local militia including John D. Lee perpetrated the 1857 Mountain Meadows Massacre, in which 120 non-Mormon settlers were killed. Fearing retribution, Lee moved in 1870 to the remote Pahreah Crossing in Arizona, where he took over a ferry first established in 1864 by Jacob Hamblin. This, the only river crossing for hundreds of miles not hemmed in by vertical canyon walls, became known as Lee's Ferry. While Lee was tried and subsequently executed in 1877, the ferry remained a major transportation link until the Navajo Bridge was completed nearby in 1928, rendering the ferry obsolete.

The Denver and Salt Lake Railway (D&SL), incorporated in 1902, sought to provide a more direct connection between Denver and Salt Lake City than either the transcontinental railroad through Wyoming or the D&RGW's route via Black Canyon and Durango. The D&SL completed a rail line into the upper headwaters of the Colorado River and blasted the Moffat Tunnel under the Continental Divide, but ran out of money before even reaching Utah. In 1931 the D&RGW completed the "Dotsero Cutoff" linking Glenwood Springs to the D&SL route at Bond, Colorado, finally completing the direct Denver–Salt Lake link with its acquisition of the bankrupt D&SL. The Gunnison River route was eventually abandoned in favor of the shorter Colorado River route, which today is owned by Union Pacific.

=== Renaming of the upper Colorado River ===
As late as 1921, the Colorado River upstream from the confluence with the Green River in Utah was still known as the Grand River. For over a decade, U.S. Representative Edward T. Taylor of Colorado petitioned the Congressional Committee on Interstate and Foreign Commerce to rename the Grand River as the Colorado River. Representatives from Wyoming, Utah, and the United States Geological Survey objected, noting that the Green River was longer and drained a larger area. Taylor argued that the Grand River should be considered the main stream, as it carried the larger volume of water. (Note: The average discharge of the Colorado (Grand) River at Cisco, Utah, about 97 miles (156 km) upstream from the Green River confluence, is 7,181 cubic feet per second (203.3 m^{3}/s); between here and the confluence, only a few small, intermittent tributaries join the river. The Green River has an average discharge of 6,048 cubic feet per second (171.3 m^{3}/s) as measured at Green River, Utah, about 117.6 miles (189.3 km) above the confluence; below here the only major tributary is the San Rafael River, which contributes an average of 131 cubic feet per second (3.7 m^{3}/s), resulting in a total of 6,169 cubic feet per second (174.7 m^{3}/s), still significantly lower than the discharge of the Colorado at their confluence.)

Taylor felt "slighted" that the Colorado River, as named, did not begin in the state of Colorado, and "he wasn't going to let Utah or Wyoming lay claim to the river's headwaters, despite the fact that the Green River is the larger drainage basin." On July 25, 1921, President Warren G. Harding signed House Joint Resolution 32 - To change the name of the Grand River in Colorado and Utah to the Colorado River.

== Engineering and development ==
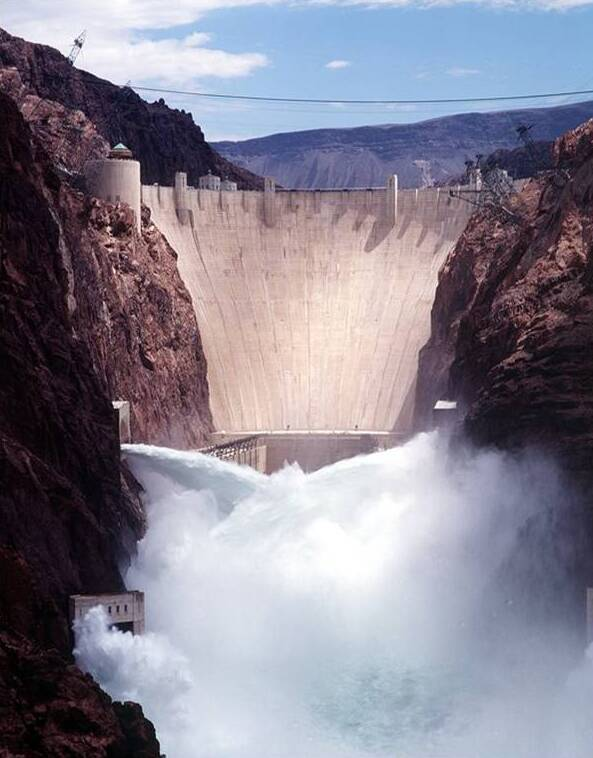
The Hoover Dam releasing water in 1998

About 40 million people depend on the Colorado River's water for agricultural, industrial and domestic needs. The Colorado irrigates 5.5 million acres (2.2 million hectares) of farmland, and its hydroelectric plants produce 12 billion kilowatt hours (KWh) of hydroelectricity each year. Hydroelectricity from the Colorado is a key supplier of peaking power on the Southwest electric grid. Often called "America's Nile", the Colorado River is so intensively managed that each drop of its water is used an average of 17 times in a single year. Southern Nevada Water Authority has called the Colorado River one of the "most controlled, controversial and litigated rivers in the world".

Colorado River water allocations, in millions of acre-feet
User	Amount	Share
United States	15.0	90.9%
California	4.4	26.7%
Colorado	3.88	23.5%
Arizona	2.8	17.0%
Utah	1.72	10.4%
Wyoming	1.05	6.4%
New Mexico	0.84	5.1%
Nevada	0.3	1.8%
Mexico	1.5	9.1%
Total	16.5	100%

In 1922, six U.S. states signed the Colorado River Compact, which divided half of the river's flow to both the Upper Basin (the drainage area above Lee's Ferry, comprising parts of Colorado, New Mexico, Utah, and Wyoming and a small portion of Arizona) and the Lower Basin (Arizona, California, Nevada, and parts of New Mexico and Utah). The Upper and Lower Basin were each allocated 7.5 million acre-feet (9.3 km^{3}) of water per year, a figure believed to represent half of the river's annual flow at Lee's Ferry. The allotments operated under the premise that approximately 17.5 million acre-feet of water flowed through the river annually.

Arizona initially refused to ratify the compact because it feared that California would take too much of the lower basin allotment. In 1944 a compromise was reached in which Arizona was allocated 2.8 million acre-feet (3.5 km^{3}), but with the caveat that California's 4.4-million-acre-foot (5.4 km^{3}) allocation was prioritized during drought years. These and nine other decisions, compacts, federal acts and agreements made between 1922 and 1973 constitute what is now known as the Law of the River.

In 1944, a treaty between the U.S. and Mexico allocated 1.5 million acre-feet (1.9 km^{3}) of Colorado River water to Mexico each year. Morelos Dam was constructed in 1950 to enable Mexico to use its share of the river. Water allocated to Mexico from the Colorado River is regulated by the International Boundary and Water Commission, which also apportions waters from the Rio Grande between the two countries.

=== Transmountain diversions ===
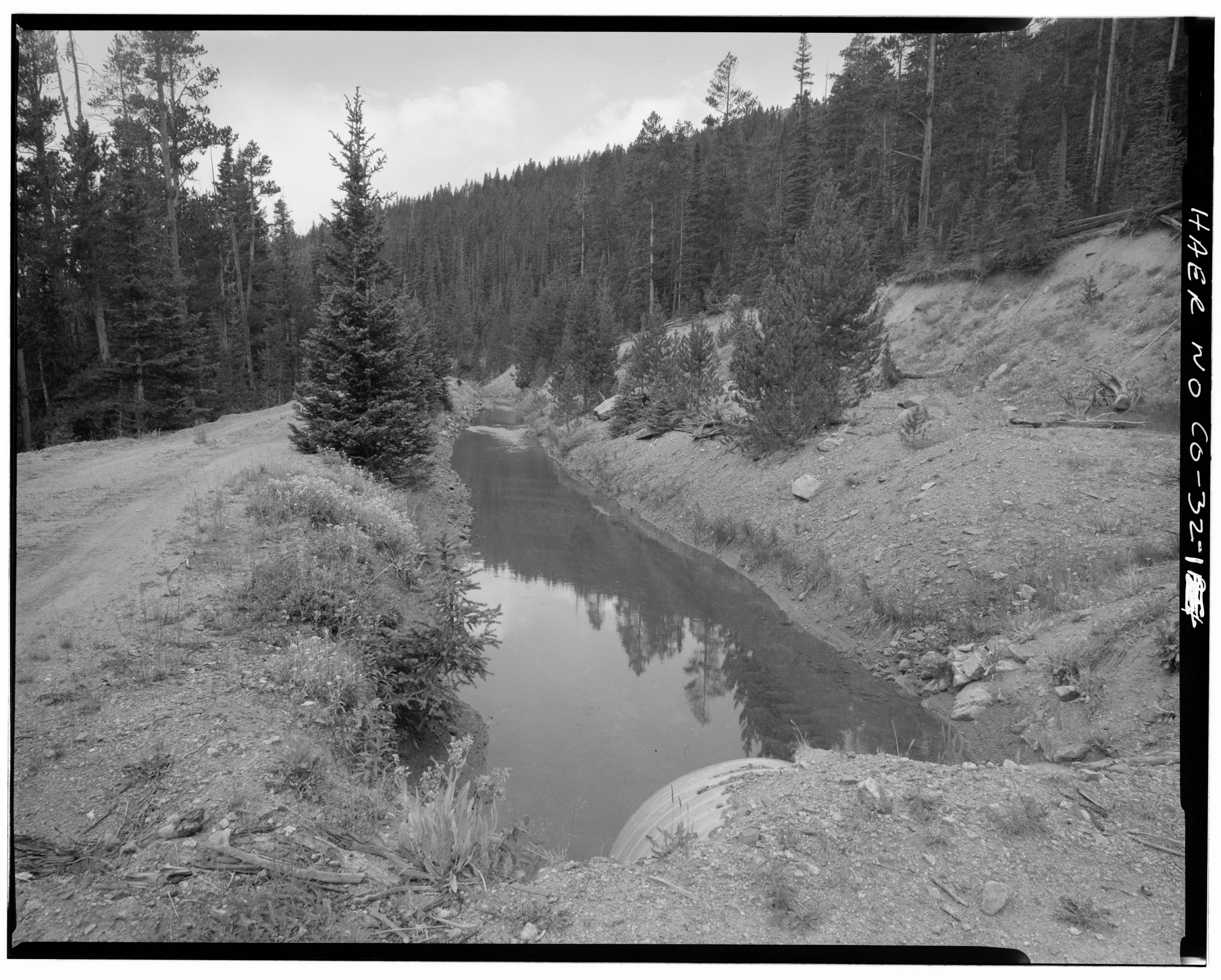
The Grand Ditch, one of the earliest water diversions of the Colorado River, is still in use today.

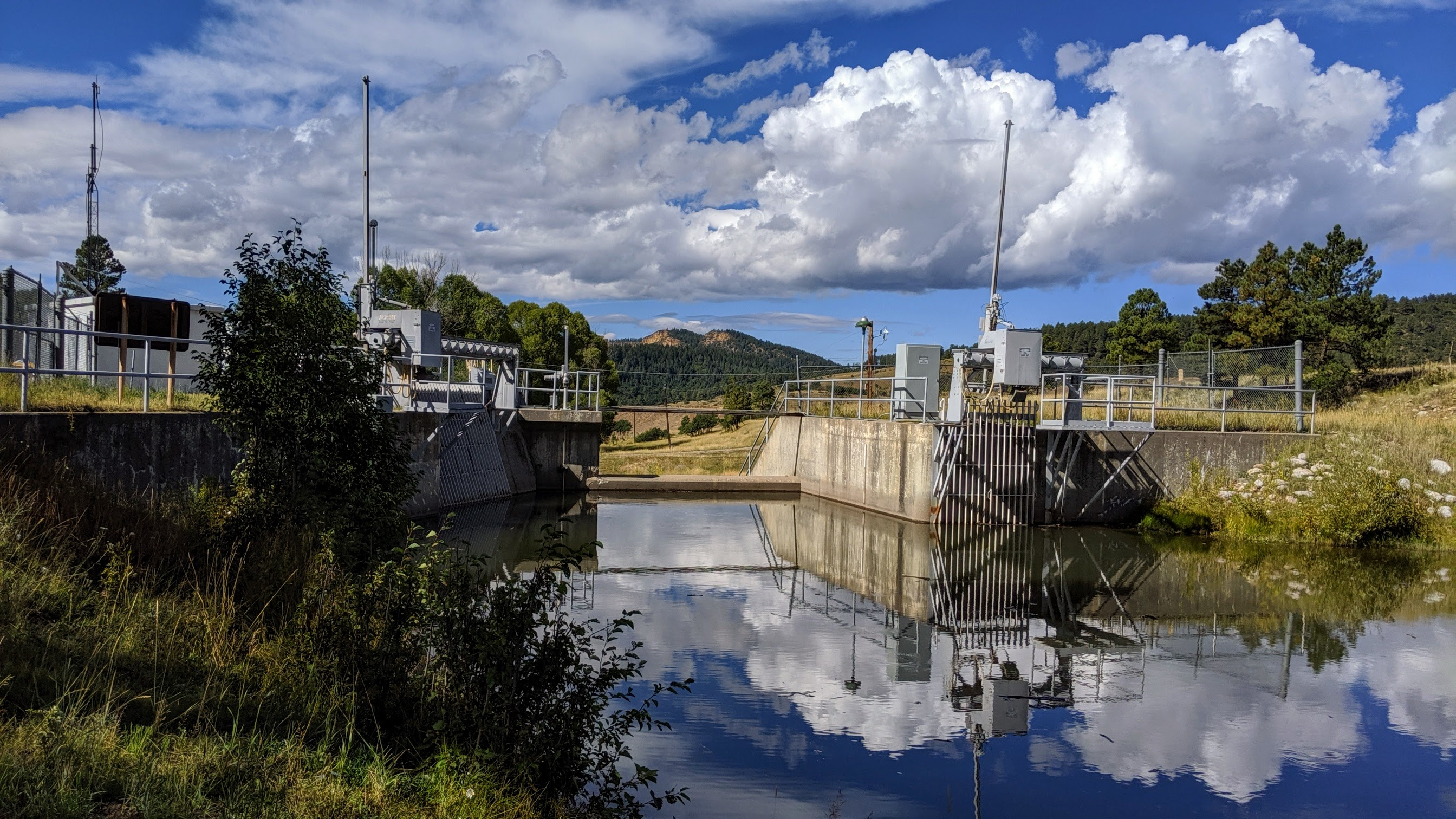
The Little Oso Diversion Dam diverts water from the Little Navajo River and transports it through a series of tunnels into the Rio Grande basin as part of the San Juan–Chama Project.

Large-scale development of Colorado River water supplies started in the late 19th century, at the river's headwaters in La Poudre Pass. The Grand Ditch, directing runoff from the river's headwaters across the Continental Divide to arid eastern Colorado, was considered an engineering marvel when completed in 1890. This was the first of twenty-four "transmountain diversions" constructed to draw water across the Rocky Mountains as the Front Range corridor increased in population. These diversions draw water from the upper Colorado and its tributaries into the South Platte River, Arkansas River and Rio Grande basins. Today, about 80 percent of Colorado's population lives on the eastern slope of the Rockies, while 80 percent of precipitation falls on the western slope.

While first planned at the same time as the Grand Ditch, construction on the Colorado–Big Thompson Project (C-BT) did not begin until the 1930s. Today, the C-BT is the largest of the transmountain diversions, delivering 230,000 acre-feet (280,000,000 m^{3}) per year from the Colorado River to cities north of Denver. Numerous other projects followed, with the largest including the Roberts Tunnel, which delivers water from the Blue River to the city of Denver, and the Fryingpan–Arkansas Project, which diverts water from the Fryingpan River to the Arkansas River basin.

Combined, the transmountain diversions draw about 580,000 acre-feet (720,000,000 m^{3}) of water per year out of the Colorado River basin. Historically, most of the water has been used for irrigation, although water usage is increasing for urban water supply and for recreational purposes such as snowmaking and increasing Eastern Slope streamflows for boating and fishing. Denver Water receives about 50 percent of its supply from the Colorado River basin. However, diversions have caused environmental harm to the upper Colorado River system by reducing streamflows in many tributaries. A number of reservoirs have been built to offset the impact of transmountain diversions by storing water for dry season release on the Western Slope, including Williams Fork Reservoir in 1959 and Wolford Mountain Reservoir in 1996.

=== The Imperial Valley and the Salton Sea ===
The Colorado River delta region in Mexico became a favored place for Americans to invest in agriculture in the late 19th century when Mexican President Porfirio Díaz welcomed foreign capital to develop the country. The Colorado River Land Company, formed by Los Angeles Times publisher Harry Chandler, his father-in-law Harrison Gray Otis, and others, developed the Mexicali Valley in Baja California as a thriving land company. The company headquarters was nominally based in Mexico, but its real headquarters was in Los Angeles, California. Land was leased mainly to Americans who were required to develop it. Colorado River water was used to irrigate the rich soil. The company largely escaped the turmoil of the Mexican Revolution (1910–20), but in the postrevolutionary period, the Mexican government expropriated the company's land to satisfy the demand for land reform.

In 1900, the California Development Company (CDC) envisioned irrigating the Imperial Valley, a then dry basin on the California–Mexico border, using water from the Colorado River. Due to the valley's location below sea level, water could be diverted and allowed to flow there entirely by gravity. Engineer George Chaffey was hired to design the Alamo Canal, which split from the Colorado near Pilot Knob, California and ran south into Mexico, where it joined the Alamo River, a dry arroyo which had historically carried overflowing floodwaters from the Colorado into the Salton Sink at the bottom of Imperial Valley. The scheme worked initially; by 1903, about four thousand people lived in the valley and more than 100,000 acres (40,000 ha) of farmland had been developed.

The Alamo Canal experienced continual problems due to the Colorado's high sediment content and its varying water levels. During low flows, the river often dropped below the level of the canal intake, while high flows silted up the intake, forcing the repeated excavation of new cuts. In early 1905, flooding destroyed the intake gates and water began to flow uncontrolled down the canal towards the Salton Sink. By August, the breach had grown large enough to swallow the entire flow of the river, which began to flood the bottom of the valley. The Southern Pacific Railroad attempted to dam the flow in order to protect their tracks which ran through the valley, but was hampered by repeated flooding.

It took seven attempts, more than $3 million, and two years for the railroad, the CDC, and the federal government to permanently block the breach and restore the river's original course – but not before part of the Imperial Valley was flooded under a 45-mile-long (72 km) lake, today's Salton Sea. The Imperial Valley fiasco demonstrated that further economic development of the region would require a dam to control the Colorado's unpredictable flows.

=== Boulder Canyon Project ===
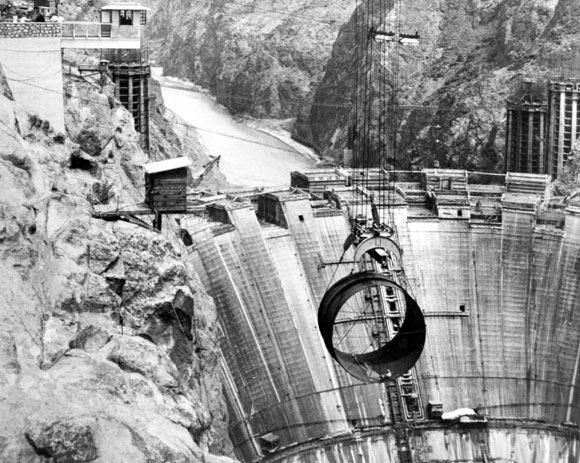
The Hoover Dam under construction, 1934

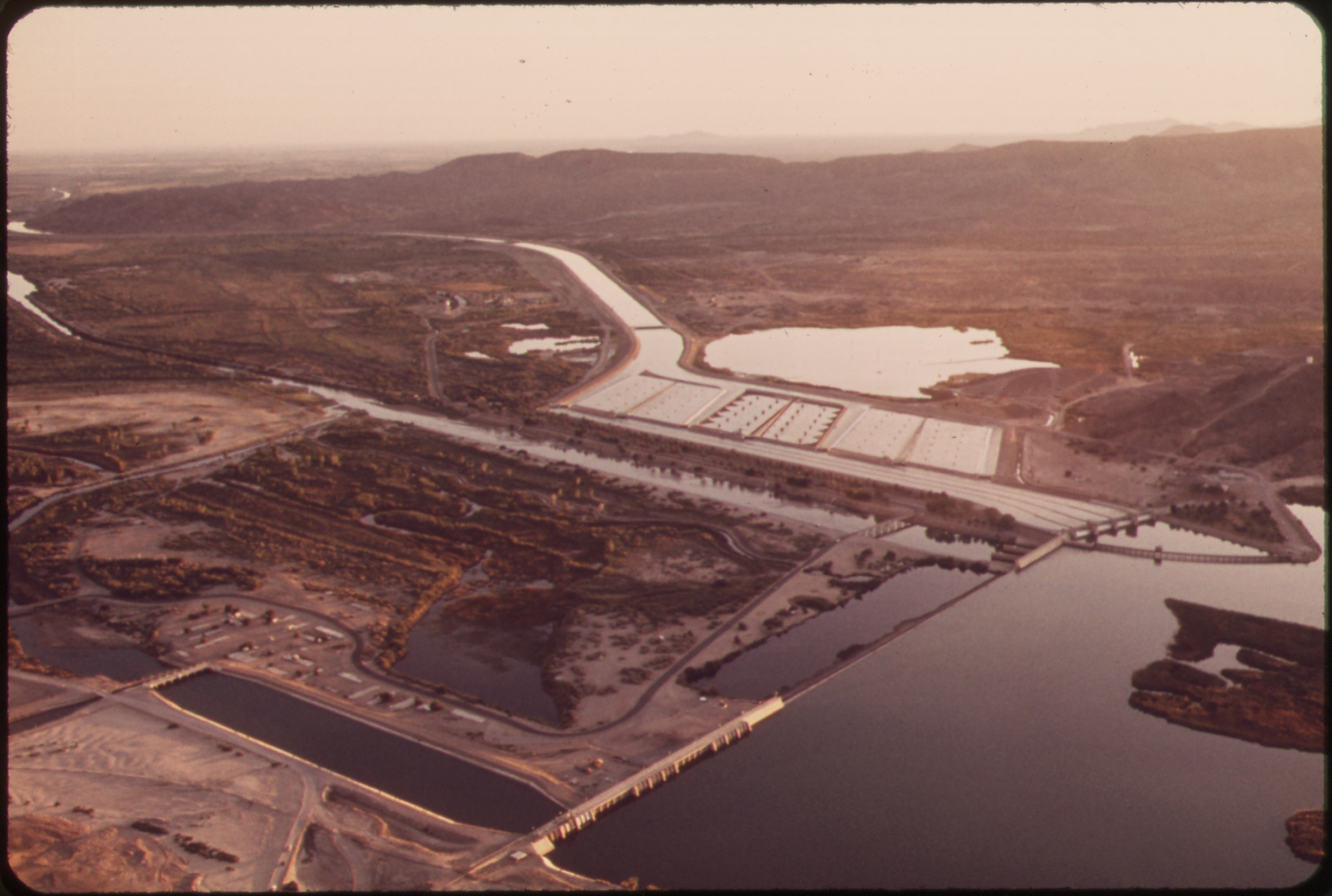
The Imperial Dam (bottom right) diverts water into the All-American Canal (center) running towards Imperial Valley.

A large dam on the Colorado River had been envisioned since the 1920s. In 1928, Congress authorized the Reclamation Service (today's U.S. Bureau of Reclamation, or USBR) to build the Boulder Canyon Project, whose key feature would be a dam on the Colorado in Black Canyon 30 miles (48 km) southeast of Las Vegas, Nevada. On September 30, 1935, Hoover Dam was completed, forming Lake Mead, capable of holding more than two years of the Colorado's flow. Lake Mead was, and still is, the largest artificial lake in the U.S. by storage capacity. The construction of Hoover Dam stabilized the lower channel of the Colorado River, stored water for irrigation in times of drought, captured sediment and controlled floods. Hoover was the tallest dam in the world at the time of construction and also had the world's largest hydroelectric power plant.

The Boulder Canyon Project Act also authorized the All-American Canal, which was built as a permanent replacement for the Alamo Canal and follows a route entirely within the U.S. on its way to the Imperial Valley. The canal's intake is located at Imperial Dam, 20 miles (32 km) above Yuma, Arizona, which diverts the majority of the Colorado's flow with only a small portion continuing to Mexico. With a capacity of over 26,000 cubic feet per second (740 m^{3}/s), the All-American Canal is the largest irrigation canal in the world.

Because the hot, sunny climate lends to a year-round growing season, the Imperial Valley has become one of the most productive farming regions in North America, providing much of the winter produce supply in the U.S. The Imperial Irrigation District supplies water to 520,000 acres (210,000 ha) south of the Salton Sea. The Coachella Canal, which branches northward from the All-American Canal, irrigates another 78,000 acres (32,000 ha) in the Coachella Valley.

Parker Dam was initially built as the diversion point for the Colorado River Aqueduct, planned by the Metropolitan Water District of Southern California to supply water to Los Angeles. The construction of the dam was opposed by Arizona, which feared that California would take too much water from the Colorado; at one point, Arizona sent members of its National Guard to stop work on the dam. Ultimately, a compromise was reached, with Arizona dropping its objections in exchange for the USBR constructing the Gila Project, which irrigates 110,000 acres (450 km^{2}) on the Arizona side of the river.

By 1941, the 241-mile (388 km) long Colorado River Aqueduct was completed, delivering 1.2 million acre-feet (1.5 km^{3}) of water west to Southern California. The aqueduct enabled the continued growth of Los Angeles and its suburbs, and provides water to about 10 million people today. The San Diego Aqueduct, which branches off from the Colorado River Aqueduct in Riverside County, California, opened in stages between 1954 and 1971 and provides water to another 3 million people in the San Diego metro area.

The Las Vegas Valley of Nevada experienced rapid growth after the Hoover Dam was built, and by 1937 Las Vegas had tapped a pipeline into Lake Mead. Nevada officials, believing that groundwater resources in the southern part of the state were sufficient for future growth, were more concerned with securing a large amount of the dam's power supply than water from the Colorado; thus they settled for the smallest water allocation of all the states in the Colorado River Compact. In 2018, due to declining water levels in Lake Mead, a second pipeline was completed with a lower intake elevation.

=== Colorado River Storage Project ===
In the first half of the 20th century, the Upper Basin states, with the exception of Colorado, had developed very little of their water allocations from the Colorado River Compact. By the 1950s, however, water demand was rapidly increasing in Utah's Wasatch Front (Salt Lake City metro area) and the Rio Grande Valley of New Mexico, which both began exploring ways to divert water from the Colorado Basin. The Upper Basin states were concerned that they would not be able to use their full Compact allocations due to increasing water demands in the Lower Basin. The Compact requires the Upper Basin to deliver a minimum annual flow of 7.5 million acre-feet (9.3×10^{9} m^{3}) past Lee's Ferry (measured on a 10-year rolling average). Without additional reservoir storage, the Upper Basin states could not use their allocations without impacting water deliveries to the Lower Basin in dry years.

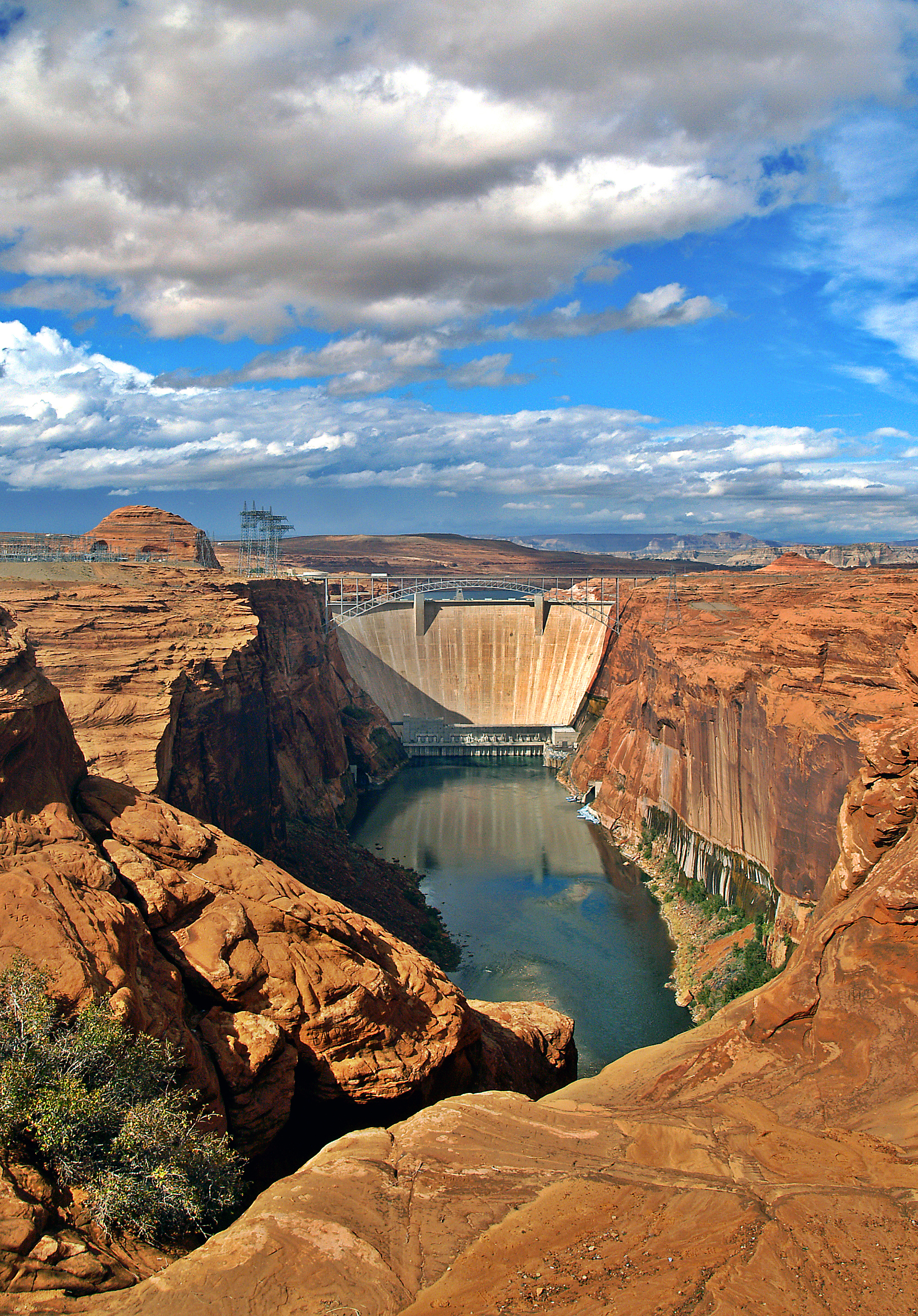
The Glen Canyon Dam, the largest dam of the Colorado River Storage Project

In 1956, Congress authorized the USBR to construct the Colorado River Storage Project (CRSP), which planned several large reservoirs on the upper Colorado, Green, Gunnison and San Juan Rivers. The initial blueprints for the CRSP included two dams on the Green River within Echo Park Canyon in Dinosaur National Monument – a move criticized by both the National Park Service and environmental groups such as the Sierra Club. The controversy received nationwide media attention, and the USBR dropped its plans for the Dinosaur dams in exchange for increasing the size of a proposed dam at Glen Canyon.

The controversy associated with Glen Canyon Dam did not build momentum until construction was well underway. Due to Glen Canyon's remote location, most of the American public did not even know of its existence; the few who did contended that it had much greater scenic value than Echo Park. The environmental movement in the American Southwest has opposed the damming and diversion of the Colorado River system due to negative effects on the ecology and natural beauty of the river and its tributaries. During the construction of Glen Canyon Dam (1956–66), environmental organizations vowed to block any further development of the river, and a number of later dam and aqueduct proposals were defeated by citizen opposition. Sierra Club leader David Brower fought the dam both during the construction and for many years afterwards until his death in 2000. Brower believed that he was personally responsible for the failure to prevent Glen Canyon's flooding, calling it his "greatest mistake, greatest sin".

In addition to Glen Canyon Dam, the CRSP includes the Flaming Gorge Dam on the Green River, the Blue Mesa, Morrow Point and Crystal Dams on the Gunnison River, and the Navajo Dam on the San Juan River. A total of 22 "participating projects" (of which 16 have been constructed) were later authorized in order to develop local water supplies at various locations across the Upper Basin states. These include the Central Utah Project, which delivers 102,000 acre-feet (126,000,000 m^{3}) per year from the Green River basin to the Wasatch Front, and the San Juan–Chama Project, which diverts 110,000 acre-feet (140,000,000 m^{3}) per year from the San Juan River to the Rio Grande Valley. Both are multi-purpose projects serving a variety of agricultural, municipal and industrial uses.

=== Pacific Southwest Water Plan ===
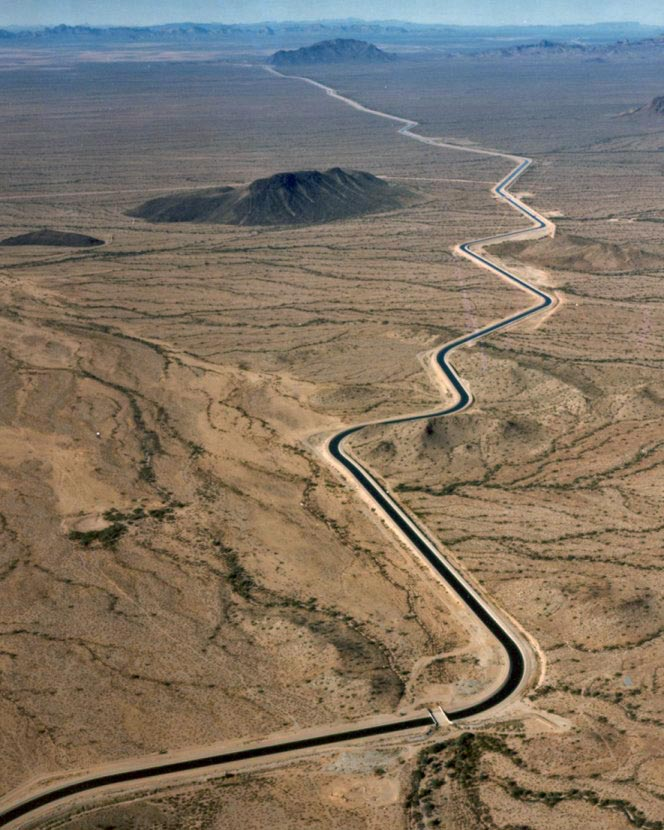
The main canal of the Central Arizona Project, crossing the Sonoran Desert

By the middle of the 20th century, planners were concerned that continued growth in water demand would outstrip the available water supply from the Colorado River. After exploring a multitude of potential projects, the USBR published a study in January 1964 known as the Pacific Southwest Water Plan, which proposed diverting water from the northwestern United States into the Colorado River basin. Arizona's water allocation was a significant focus of the plan, due to the growing concern that its water supply could be curtailed due to California's seniority of water rights. In addition, the plan would guarantee full water supplies to Nevada, California and Mexico, allowing the Upper Basin states to use their full allocations without risking reductions in the Lower Basin. The project would cost an estimated $3.1 billion.

The first stage of this plan would divert water from Northern California's Trinity, Klamath and Eel Rivers to Southern California, allowing more Colorado River water to be used, by exchange, in Arizona. A canal system, which ultimately would become the Central Arizona Project (CAP), would be constructed to deliver Arizona's Colorado River allocation to Phoenix and Tucson, both located far away from the Colorado River in the middle of the state. At this point, central Arizona was still entirely dependent on local water supplies, such as the 1911 Theodore Roosevelt Dam, and was quickly running out of surplus water. Groundwater was pumped at unsustainable rates, and aquifers were collapsing.

In order to supply the massive amount of power required to pump Colorado River water to central Arizona, two hydroelectric dams were proposed in the Grand Canyon (Bridge Canyon Dam and Marble Canyon Dam), which while not directly located in Grand Canyon National Park, would greatly impact flows of the Colorado River through the park. With the controversy over Glen Canyon Dam still ongoing, the public pressure against these dams was immense.

As a result, the two Grand Canyon dams were omitted from the final CAP authorization in 1968. The boundaries of Grand Canyon National Park were redrawn to prevent future dam projects in the area. The pumping power was replaced by the building of the coal-fired Navajo Generating Station near Page, Arizona, in 1976. In 2019, the Navajo Generating Station ceased operation.

The CAP was constructed in stages from 1973 to 1993, ultimately extending 336 miles (541 km) from the Colorado River at Parker Dam to Tucson, Arizona. It delivers 1.4 million acre-feet (1.7 km^{3}) of water per year, irrigates 830,000 acres (3,400 km^{2}) of farmland and provides municipal water to about 5 million people. Due to financial and environmental concerns, most of the facilities proposed in the Pacific Southwest Water Plan were never built (though a smaller version of the Trinity River project was constructed as part of the unrelated Central Valley Project), leaving Arizona and Nevada vulnerable to future water reductions under the Compact.

=== Indigenous water rights ===
Water rights of Native Americans in the United States and Indigenous peoples of Mexico in the Colorado River basin were largely ignored during the extensive water resources development carried out on the river and its tributaries in the 19th and 20th centuries. The construction of dams has often had negative impacts on tribal peoples. For instance, the Chemehuevi saw their riverside lands flooded after the completion of Parker Dam in 1938. In Mexico, the Cocopah faced a depletion of their fishery resources following a decrease of the Colorado River Delta size by 90% of its original size, disrupting social and economic foundations upon which the community had developed and sustained.

Ten Native American tribes in the basin now hold or continue to claim water rights to the Colorado River.

The U.S. government has taken some actions to help quantify and develop the water resources of Native American reservations. The first federally funded irrigation project in the U.S. was the construction of an irrigation canal on the Colorado River Indian Reservation in 1867. Other water projects include the Navajo Indian Irrigation Project, authorized in 1962 for the irrigation of lands in part of the Navajo Nation in north-central New Mexico.

The Navajo continue to seek expansion of their water rights because of difficulties with the water supply on their reservation. About 40 percent of its inhabitants must haul water by truck many miles to their homes. In the 21st century, they have filed legal claims against the governments of Arizona, New Mexico and Utah for increased water rights. Some of these claims have been successful for the Navajo, such as a 2004 settlement in which they received a 326,000-acre-foot (402,000 ML) allotment from New Mexico.

== Water supply and drought in the 21st century ==
[The Colorado is] a 'deficit' river, as if the river were somehow at fault for its overuse.

— Marc Reisner, in Cadillac Desert

The original Colorado River Compact was based on an extremely limited period of streamflow records estimating an annual river volume of 17.5 million acre-feet (21.6 km^{3}) at Lee's Ferry. Annual streamflow trended lower after the 1930s, and Paleoclimatological research including studies of tree rings has suggested long-term water availability is closer to 13.5 million acre-feet (16.7 km^{3}). (Note: The discrepancy between the natural flow at Lee's Ferry (13.5 million acre-feet or 16.65 km^{3}) and the gauged flow between 1922 and 2020 (10.58 million acre-feet or 13.05 km^{3}) is mostly due to water diversions above Lee's Ferry and evaporation from Lake Powell and other reservoirs.) Despite the large discrepancy between allocated and available water, this was not an issue during the early 20th century as the basin had a far smaller population than it does now. After the 1960s, the amount of irrigated land and population increased rapidly. By the early 2000s water over-allocation was becoming a serious issue.

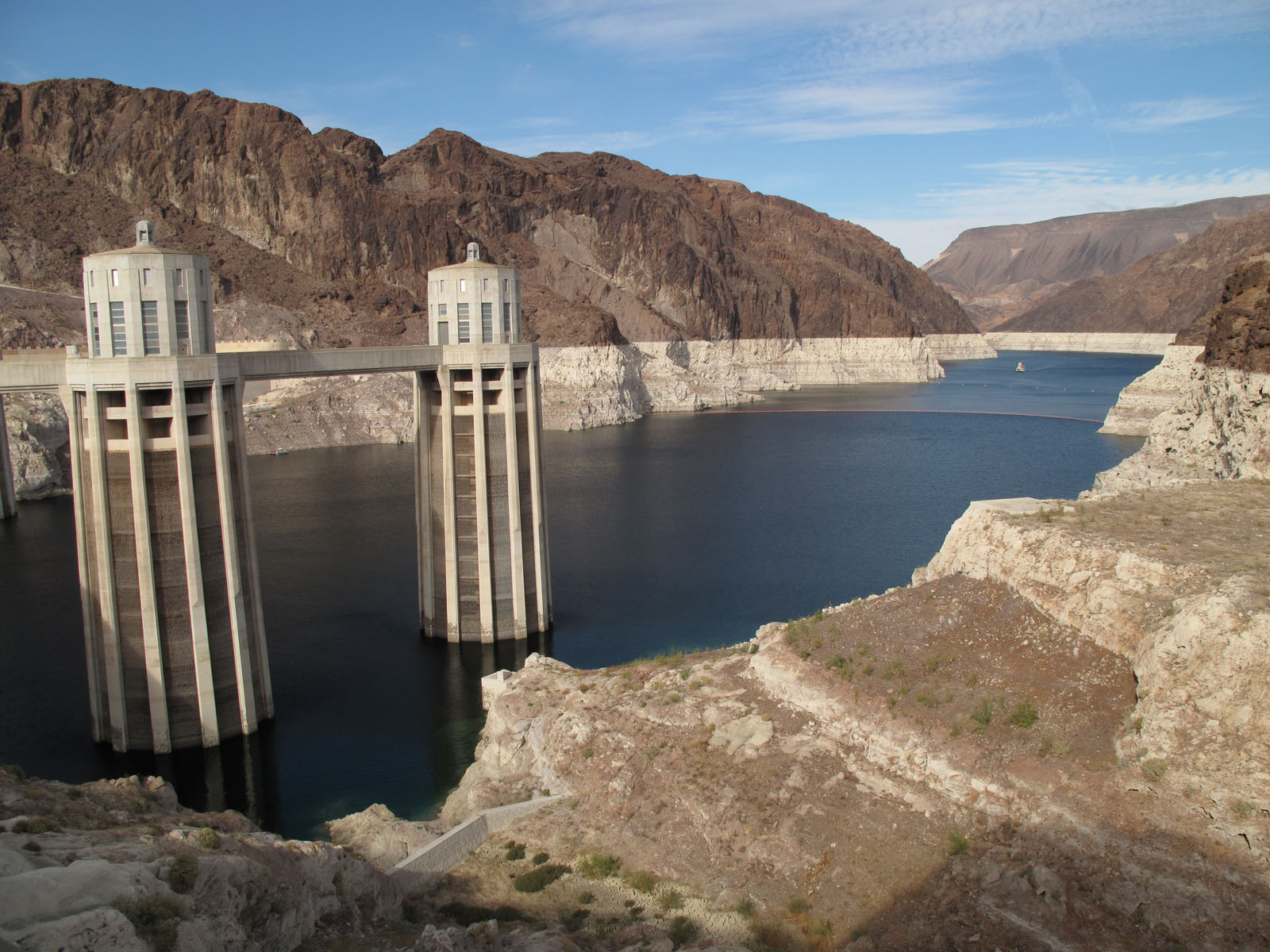
Lake Mead in 2010, showing the "bathtub ring" left behind by low water levels

The issue of water over-allocation has been compounded by drought. Between 2000 and 2021, only five years saw above-average runoff as compared to the 20th century record. Warmer spring temperatures and lower spring rainfall in the Rocky Mountains have been found to cause serious losses in snowmelt runoff, which soaks into dry soils or is lost to evapotranspiration before making its way into the Colorado River. Reservoir storage in the basin has steadily declined since 2000, Following a particularly dry spell between 2000 and 2004, Lake Powell reached its lowest level since 1969 (when the reservoir was first being filled). In 2010, Lake Mead first approached the "drought trigger" elevation of 1,075 feet (328 m), at which water supplies to Arizona and Nevada would be reduced in accordance with the Colorado River Compact. (Note: Due to Arizona and Nevada's water rights being junior to California's, their allocations can legally be cut to zero before any reductions are made on the California side.) A wet winter in 2011 temporarily raised lake levels, but dry conditions soon returned. In 2014, the Bureau of Reclamation cut Lake Powell releases by 10 percent – the first such reduction since the reservoir's original filling.

In July 2021, Lake Powell fell below the previous low set in 2005. In response, the Bureau of Reclamation began releasing water from upstream reservoirs in order to keep Powell above the minimum level for hydropower generation. Lake Mead fell below the critical 1,075-foot (328 m) threshold triggering potential cuts to Arizona and Nevada's water supplies. In August, the Bureau of Reclamation officially declared a shortage for the first time, announcing that due to "ongoing historic drought and low runoff conditions in the Colorado River Basin, downstream releases from Glen Canyon Dam and Hoover Dam will be reduced in 2022 due to declining reservoir levels." This would reduce water deliveries to Arizona by 18 percent, Nevada by 7 percent, and Mexico by 5 percent.

In the 21st century, the water level of Lake Powell has declined from near maximum capacity to within 30 feet (9.1 m) of the minimum level needed for Glen Canyon Dam to generate electricity.

In the 21st century, the water level of Lake Mead has declined from near maximum capacity to within 100 feet (30 m) of the minimum level needed for Hoover Dam to generate electricity.

In June 2022, Bureau of Reclamation Commissioner Camille Touton told the Senate Committee on Energy and Natural Resources that additional cuts of 2–4 million acre-feet (2.5–4.9 km^{3}) were required to stabilize reservoir levels. Touton warned that if states were unable to negotiate the requisite cuts, the federal government may use its legal authority to cut releases. The Bureau of Reclamation projected that Lake Powell could fall low enough by July 2023 that Glen Canyon Dam would no longer be able to generate power, a scenario referred to as "dead pool". When the states were unable to come to an agreement, the Bureau of Reclamation began the legal steps to unilaterally reduce releases from Hoover and Glen Canyon Dams in 2023.

In April 2023, the Bureau of Reclamation proposed cutting allocations to Arizona, California and Nevada evenly – as much as one-quarter for each state, ignoring senior water rights held mostly by California farmers. In May, the three states reached a temporary agreement to reduce water use by 3 million acre-feet (3.7 km^{3}) over the next three years. Another 0.7 million acre-feet (0.86 km^{3}) of cuts were to be negotiated later. The cuts were less than the federal government had demanded, and so further cuts will be needed after 2026. The federal government also provided funding to recycle water, increase efficiency, and competitive grants to pay water rights holders to reduce use through the Infrastructure Investment and Jobs Act and Inflation Reduction Act, and other programs funded through the Environmental Protection Agency and Department of the Interior. These are projected to reduce demand by hundreds of thousands of acre-feet per year.

== Ecology ==
=== Wildlife and plants ===
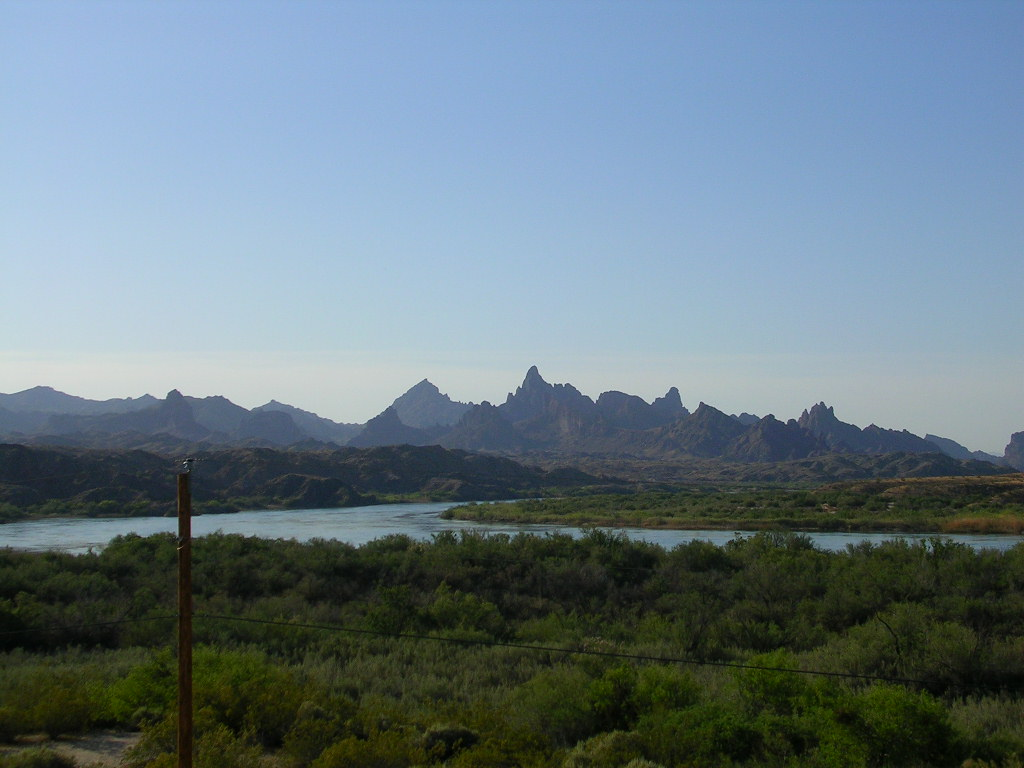
Heavily forested banks of the Colorado River near Topock, Arizona

The Colorado River and its tributaries often nourish extensive corridors of riparian growth as they traverse the arid desert regions of the watershed. Although riparian zones represent a relatively small proportion of the basin and have been affected by engineering projects and river diversion in many places, they have the greatest biodiversity of any habitat in the basin. The most prominent riparian zones along the river occur along the lower Colorado below Davis Dam, especially in the Colorado River Delta, where riparian areas support 358 species of birds despite the reduction in freshwater flow and invasive plants such as tamarisk (salt cedar). Reduction of the delta's size has also threatened animals such as jaguars and the vaquita porpoise, which is endemic to the gulf. Human development of the Colorado River has also helped to create new riparian zones by smoothing the river's seasonal flow, notably through the Grand Canyon.

More than 1,600 species of plants grow in the Colorado River watershed, ranging from the creosote bush, saguaro cactus, and Joshua trees of the Sonoran and Mojave Deserts to the forests of the Rocky Mountains and other uplands, composed mainly of ponderosa pine, subalpine fir, Douglas-fir and Engelmann spruce. Before logging in the 19th century, forests were abundant in high elevations as far south as the Mexico–U.S. border, and runoff from these areas nourished abundant grassland communities in river valleys.

Some arid regions of the watershed, such as the upper Green River valley in Wyoming, Canyonlands National Park in Utah and the San Pedro River valley in Arizona and Sonora, supported extensive reaches of grassland roamed by large mammals such as buffalo and antelope as late as the 1860s. Near Tucson, Arizona, "where now there is only powder-dry desert, the grass once reached as high as the head of a man on horse back".

Rivers and streams in the Colorado basin were once home to 49 species of native fish, of which 42 were endemic. Engineering projects and river regulation have led to the extinction of four species and severe declines in the populations of 40 species. Bonytail chub, razorback sucker, Colorado pikeminnow, and humpback chub are among those considered the most at risk; all are unique to the Colorado River system and well adapted to the river's natural silty conditions and flow variations. Clear, cold water released by dams has significantly changed characteristics of habitat for these and other Colorado River basin fishes. A further 40 species that occur in the river today, notably the brown trout, were introduced during the 19th and 20th centuries, mainly for sport fishing. Many fish native to Arizona are threatened or endangered.

=== Impacts of development ===
Most of the Colorado River basin water used by humans is used to grow feed for livestock—more than four times the amount used for crops for direct human consumption.

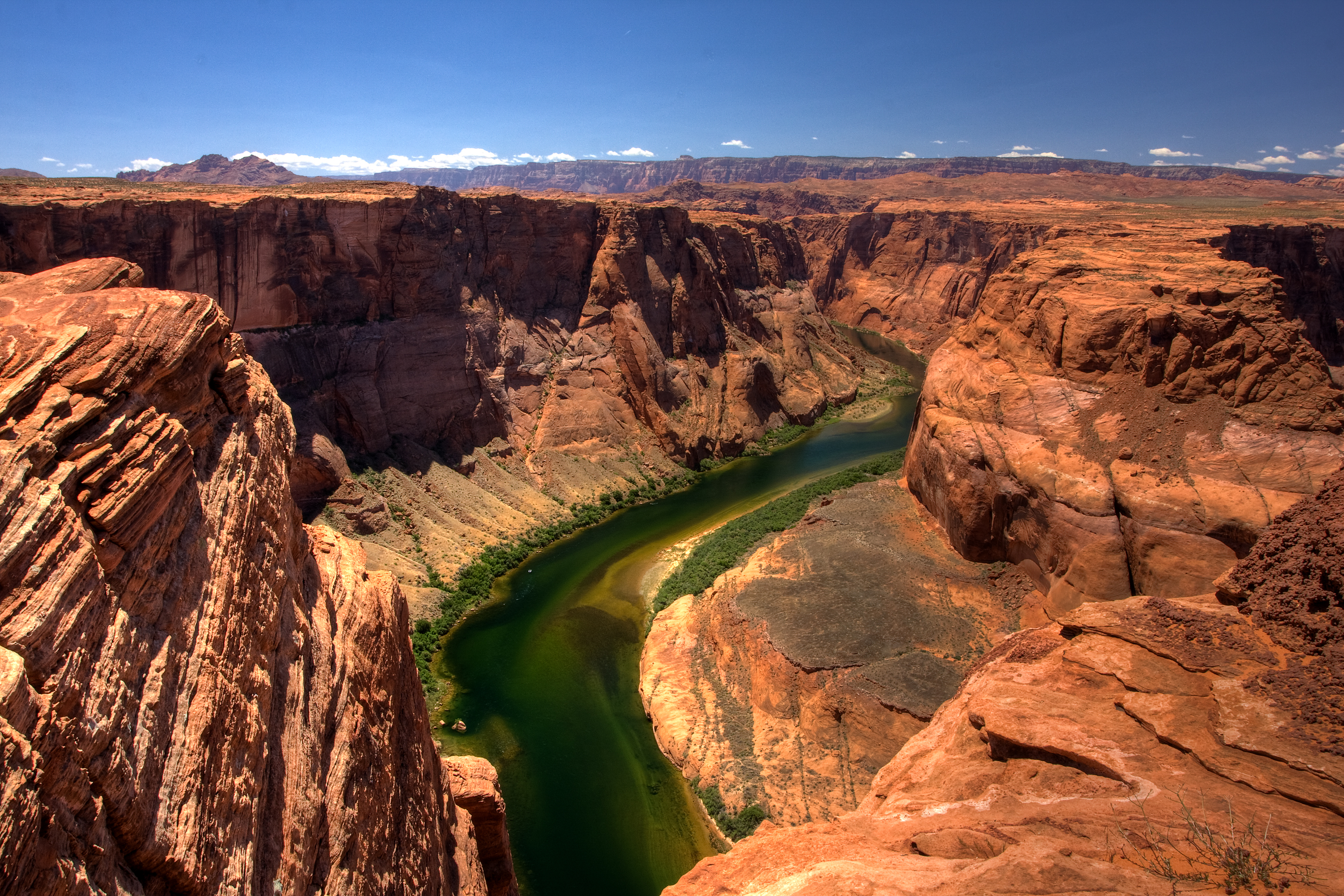
The Colorado was named for the reddish color caused by its natural sediment loads. Damming the river has caused it to acquire a clear green hue as seen here in lower Glen Canyon.

Historically, the Colorado transported from 85 to 100 million short tons (77,000,000 to 91,000,000 t) of sediment or silt to the Gulf of California each year – second only to the Mississippi among North American rivers. This sediment nourished wetlands and riparian areas along the river's lower course, particularly in its 3,000-square-mile (7,800 km^{2}) delta, once the largest desert estuary on the continent. Currently, the majority of sediments carried by the Colorado River are deposited at the upper end of Lake Powell, and most of the remainder ends up in Lake Mead. Various estimates place the time it would take for Powell to completely fill with silt at 300 to 700 years. Dams trapping sediment not only pose damage to river habitat but also threaten future operations of the Colorado River reservoir system.

Reduction in flow caused by dams, diversions, water for thermoelectric power stations, and evaporation losses from reservoirs – the latter of which consumes more than 15 percent of the river's natural runoff—has had severe ecological consequences in the Colorado River Delta and the Gulf of California. Historically, the delta with its large freshwater outflow and extensive salt marshes provided an important breeding ground for aquatic species in the Gulf. Today's desiccated delta, at only a fraction of its former size, no longer provides suitable habitat, and populations of fish, shrimp and sea mammals in the gulf have seen a dramatic decline. Since 1963, the only times when the Colorado River has reached the ocean have been during El Niño events in the 1980s and 1990s.

Reduced flows have led to increases in the concentration of certain substances in the lower river that have impacted water quality. Salinity is one of the major issues and also leads to the corrosion of pipelines in agricultural and urban areas. The lower Colorado's salt content was about 50 parts per million (ppm) in its natural state, but by the 1960s, it had increased to well over 2000 ppm. By the early 1970s, there was also serious concern about salinity caused by salts leached from local soils by irrigation drainage water, which were estimated to add 10 million short tons (9,100,000 t) of excess salt to the river per year.

In 1974, the Colorado River Basin Salinity Control Act was passed, mandating conservation practices including the reduction of saline drainage. The program reduced the annual load by about 1.2 million short tons (1,100,000 t), but salinity remains an ongoing issue. In 1997, the USBR estimated that saline irrigation water caused crop damages exceeding $500 million in the U.S. and $100 million in Mexico. Further efforts have been made to combat the salt issue in the lower Colorado, including the construction of a desalination plant at Yuma. In 2011, the seven U.S. states agreed upon a "Plan of Implementation", which aims to reduce salinity by 644,000 short tons (584,000 t) per year by 2030. In 2013, the Bureau of Reclamation estimated that around $32 million was spent each year to prevent around 1.2 million tons of salt from entering and damaging the Colorado River.

Agricultural runoff containing pesticide residues has also been concentrated in the lower river in greater amounts. This has led to fish kills; six of these events were recorded between 1964 and 1968 alone. The pesticide issue is even greater in streams and water bodies near agricultural lands irrigated by the Imperial Irrigation District with Colorado River water. In the Imperial Valley, Colorado River water used for irrigation overflows into the New and Alamo rivers and into the Salton Sea. Both rivers and the sea are among the most polluted bodies of water in the United States, posing dangers not only to aquatic life but to contact by humans and migrating birds. Pollution from agricultural runoff is not limited to the lower river; the issue is also significant in upstream reaches such as Colorado's Grand Valley, also a major center of irrigated agriculture.

Large dams such as Hoover and Glen Canyon typically release water from lower levels of their reservoirs, resulting in stable and relatively cold year-round temperatures in long reaches of the river. The Colorado's average temperature once ranged from 85 °F (29 °C) at the height of summer to near freezing in winter, but modern flows through the Grand Canyon, for example, rarely deviate significantly from 46 °F (8 °C). Changes in temperature regime have caused declines of native fish populations, and stable flows have enabled increased vegetation growth, obstructing riverside habitat. These flow patterns have also made the Colorado more dangerous to recreational boaters; people are more likely to die of hypothermia in the colder water, and the general lack of flooding allows rockslides to build up, making the river more difficult to navigate.

==== Minute 319 ====
In the 21st century, there has been renewed interest in restoring a limited water flow to the delta. In November 2012, the U.S. and Mexico reached an agreement, known as Minute 319, permitting Mexico storage of its water allotment in U.S. reservoirs during wet years, thus increasing the efficiency with which the water can be used. In addition to renovating irrigation canals in the Mexicali Valley to reduce leakage, this will make about 45,000 acre-feet (56,000,000 m^{3}) per year available for release to the delta on average. The water will be used to provide both an annual base flow and a spring "pulse flow" to mimic the river's original snowmelt-driven regime.

The first pulse flow, an eight-week release of 105,000 acre-feet (130,000,000 m^{3}), was initiated on March 21, 2014, with the aim of revitalising 2,350 acres (950 hectares) of wetland. This pulse reached the sea on May 16, 2014, marking the first time in 16 years that any water from the Colorado flowed into the ocean, and was hailed as "an experiment of historic political and ecological significance" and a landmark in U.S.–Mexican cooperation in conservation. The pulse will be followed by the steady release of 52,000 acre-feet (64,000,000 m^{3}) over the following three years, just a small fraction of its average flow before damming.

== Recreation ==
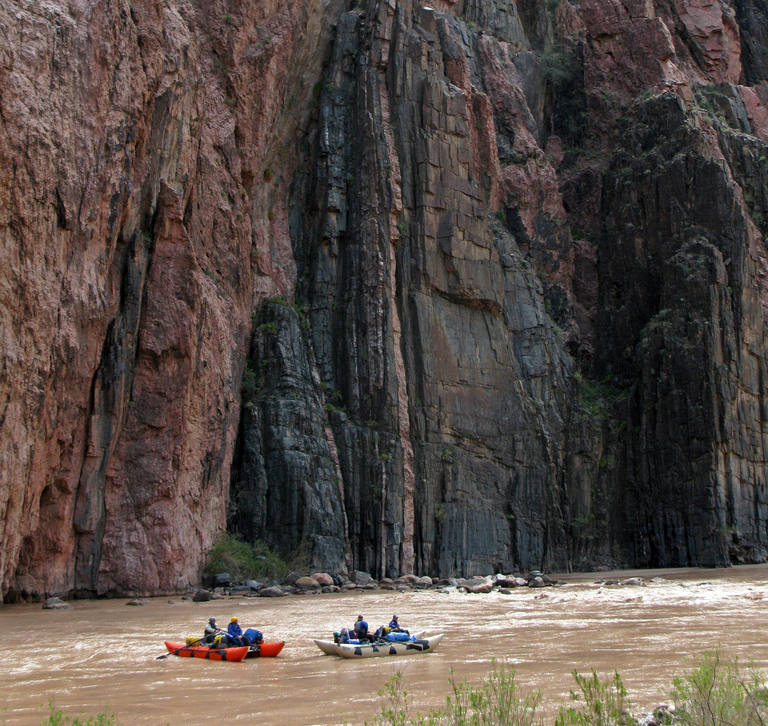
A rafting party on the Colorado River

Famous for its rapids and canyons, the Colorado is one of the most well-known whitewater rivers in the United States, and its Grand Canyon section—run by more than 22,000 people annually—has been called the "granddaddy of rafting trips". Grand Canyon trips typically begin at Lee's Ferry and take out at Diamond Creek or Lake Mead; they range from one to eighteen days for commercial trips and from two to twenty-five days for private trips. Private (noncommercial) trips are extremely difficult to arrange because the National Park Service limits river traffic for environmental purposes; people who desire such a trip often have to wait more than 10 years for the opportunity.

Several other sections of the river and its tributaries are popular whitewater runs, and many of these are also served by commercial outfitters. The Colorado's Cataract Canyon and many reaches in the Colorado headwaters are even more heavily used than the Grand Canyon, and about 60,000 boaters run a single 4.5-mile (7.2 km) section above Radium, Colorado, each year. The upper Colorado also includes many of the river's most challenging rapids, including those in Gore Canyon, which is considered so dangerous that "boating is not recommended". Another section of the river above Moab, known as the Colorado "Daily" or "Fisher Towers Section", is the most visited whitewater run in Utah, with more than 77,000 visitors in 2011 alone. The rapids of the Green River's Gray and Desolation Canyons and the less difficult "Goosenecks" section of the lower San Juan River are also frequently traversed by boaters.

Eleven U.S. national parks—Arches, Black Canyon of the Gunnison, Bryce Canyon, Canyonlands, Capitol Reef, Grand Canyon, Mesa Verde, Petrified Forest, Rocky Mountain, Saguaro, and Zion—are in the watershed, in addition to many national forests, state parks, and recreation areas. Hiking, backpacking, camping, skiing, and fishing are among the multiple recreation opportunities offered by these areas. Fisheries have declined in many streams in the watershed, especially in the Rocky Mountains, because of polluted runoff from mining and agricultural activities.

The Colorado's major reservoirs are also heavily traveled summer destinations. Houseboating and water-skiing are popular activities on Lakes Mead, Powell, Havasu, and Mojave, as well as Flaming Gorge Reservoir in Utah and Wyoming, and Navajo Reservoir in New Mexico and Colorado. Lake Powell and surrounding Glen Canyon National Recreation Area received more than two million visitors per year in 2007, while nearly 7.9 million people visited Lake Mead and the Lake Mead National Recreation Area in 2008. Colorado River recreation employs some 250,000 people and contributes $26 billion each year to the Southwest economy.

== See also ==
- Colorado River Delta
- Colorado Desert
- List of Colorado River rapids and features
- List of dams in the Colorado River system
- List of largest reservoirs in the United States
- List of longest rivers of Mexico
- List of longest rivers of the United States (by main stem)
- London Bridge (Lake Havasu City)
- Moab uranium mill tailings pile
- Upper Colorado River Endangered Fish Recovery Program

== Works cited ==
- Annerino, John (1999). Canyoneering: How to Explore the Canyons of the Great Southwest. Stackpole Books. ISBN 978-0-8117-2700-6.
- Armstead, Lloyd Dean (1997). Whitewater Rafting in North America: More than 100 River Adventures in the United States and Canada. Globe Pequot. ISBN 978-0-7627-0083-7.
- Axelrod, Alan; Phillips, Charles (2008). What Every American Should Know About American History: 225 Events That Shaped The Nation. Adams Media. ISBN 978-1-59869-428-4.
- Barnes, Will Croft (1988). Arizona Place Names. University of Arizona Press. ISBN 978-0-8165-1074-0.
- Benke, Arthur C.; Cushing, Colbert E. (2005). Rivers of North America. Academic Press. ISBN 978-0-12-088253-3.
- Billington, David P.; Jackson, Donald C.; Melosi, Martin V. (2005). "The History of Large Federal Dams: Planning, Design and Construction in the Era of Big Dams" (PDF). U.S. Bureau of Reclamation. Archived from the original (PDF) on February 22, 2012.
- Blond, Becca; Dunford, Lisa; Schulte-Peevers, Andrea (2008). Southwest USA. Lonely Planet Travel Guides. Lonely Planet. ISBN 978-1-74104-713-4.
- Bolton, Herbert Eugene (2017). Rim of Christendom: A Biography of Eusebio Francisco Kino: Pacific Coast Pioneer. University of Arizona Press. ISBN 978-0-8165-3570-5.
- Brown, Robert Leaman (1972). Colorado Ghost Towns – Past and Present. Caxton Press. ISBN 978-0-87004-218-8.
- Casey, Robert L. (2007). Journey to the High Southwest: A Traveler's Guide to Santa Fe and the Four Corners of Arizona, Colorado, New Mexico, and Utah. Globe Pequot. ISBN 978-0-7627-4064-2.
- Committee to Review the Glen Canyon Environmental Studies (1996). River Resource Management in the Grand Canyon. National Academy Press. ISBN 978-0-309-05448-5.
- Dellenbaugh, Frederick Samuel (1909). The Romance of the Colorado River: The Story of its Discovery in 1540, With an Account of the Later Explorations, and with Special Reference to the Voyages of Powell Through The Line of the Great Canyons. G.P. Putnam's Sons. OCLC 645167127.
- Dolnick, Edward (2002). Down the Great Unknown: John Wesley Powell's Journey of Discovery and Tragedy Through the Grand Canyon. HarperCollins. ISBN 978-0-06-095586-1.
- Felger, Richard Stephen; Broyles, Bill (2007). Dry borders: great natural reserves of the Sonoran desert. University of Utah Press. ISBN 978-0-87480-818-6.
- Fielder, John (2002). John Fielder's Best of Colorado. Big Earth Publishing. ISBN 978-1-56579-429-0.
- Fradkin, Philip L. (1996). A River No More: The Colorado River and the West (2 ed.). University of California Press. ISBN 978-0-520-20564-2.
- Glass, Mary Ellen; Glass, Al (1983). Touring Nevada: A Historic and Scenic Guide. University of Nevada Press. ISBN 978-0-87417-074-0.
- Gudde, Erwin G.; Bright, William (2004). California Place Names: The Origin and Etymology of Current Geographical Names. University of California Press. ISBN 978-0-520-24217-3.
- Gupta, Avijit (2007). Large Rivers: Geomorphology and Management. John Wiley and Sons. ISBN 978-0-470-84987-3.
- Gupta, S.K. (2010). Modern Hydrology and Sustainable Water Development. John Wiley & Sons. ISBN 978-1-4443-2397-9.
- Ghiglieri, Michael P.; Myers, Thomas M. (2001). Over the Edge: Death in Grand Canyon (1st, tenth revision ed.). Flagstaff: Puma Press. ISBN 978-0-9700973-1-6.
- Hopkins, Ralph Lee (2002). Hiking the Southwest's Geology: Four Corners Region. The Mountaineers Books. ISBN 978-1-59485-169-8.
- Kessel, William B.; Wooster, Robert (2005). Encyclopedia of Native American Wars And Warfare. Infobase Publishing. ISBN 978-0-8160-3337-9.
- Lankford, Andrea (2010). Ranger Confidential: Living, Working, and Dying in the National Parks. Globe Pequot. ISBN 978-0-7627-5263-8.
- Leuchtenburg, William Edward (2000). American Places: Encounters with History. Oxford University Press. ISBN 978-0-19-513026-3.
- Leopold, Luna Bergere (1994). A View of the River. Harvard University Press. ISBN 978-0-674-93732-1.
- Lindberg, Eric (2009). Colorado Off the Beaten Path: A Guide to Unique Places. Globe Pequot. ISBN 978-0-7627-5024-5.
- Lingenfelter, Richard E. (1978). Steamboats on the Colorado River, 1852–1916. University of Arizona Press. ISBN 978-0-8165-0650-7.
- Logan, Michael F. (2006). Desert Cities: The Environmental History of Phoenix and Tucson. University of Pittsburgh Press. ISBN 978-0-8229-4294-8.
- Miller, Stephen Robert (October 31, 2023). Over the Seawall. Washington, D. C: Island Press. ISBN 978-1-64283-257-0.
- Nobles, Gregory H. (1998). American Frontiers: Cultural Encounters and Continental Conquest. Macmillan. ISBN 978-0-8090-1602-0.
- Powell, Allan Kent (2003). The Utah Guide (3 ed.). Fulcrum Publishing. ISBN 978-1-55591-114-0.
- Prisciantelli, Tom (2002). Spirit of the American Southwest: Geology, Ancient Eras and Prehistoric People, Hiking Through Time. Sunstone Press. ISBN 978-0-86534-354-2.
- Pritzker, Barry (1998). Native Americans: An Encyclopedia of History, Culture, and Peoples. Vol. 1. ABC-CLIO. ISBN 978-0-87436-836-9.
- Reisner, Marc (1993). Cadillac Desert. Penguin. ISBN 978-0-14-017824-1.
- Rolle, Andrew (1999). John Charles Fremont: Character As Destiny. University of Oklahoma Press. ISBN 978-0-8061-3135-1.
- Schmidt, Jeremy (1993). Grand Canyon National Park: A Natural History Guide. Houghton Mifflin Harcourt. ISBN 978-0-395-59932-7.
- Van Cott, John W. (1990). Utah Place Names: A Comprehensive Guide to the Origins of Geographic Names. University of Utah Press. ISBN 978-0-87480-345-7.
- Wildfang, Frederic B. (2005). Lake Havasu City. Images of America. Arcadia Publishing. ISBN 978-0-7385-3012-3.
- Wiltshire, Richard L.; Gilbert, David R.; Rogers, Jerry R., eds. (2010). Hoover Dam 75th Anniversary History Symposium: Proceedings of the Hoover Dam 75th Anniversary History Symposium, October 21–22, 2010, Las Vegas, Nevada. ASCE Publications. ISBN 978-0-7844-1141-4.
- Young, Richard A.; Spamer, Earle E. (2001). The Colorado River: Origin and Evolution. Grand Canyon Association. ISBN 978-0-938216-79-7.
