= Frank Sowinski =

American basketball player

Personal information
- Born: North Arlington, New Jersey, U.S.
- Listed height: 6 ft 5 in (1.96 m)
- Listed weight: 185 lb (84 kg)

Career information
- High school: Hanover Park (East Hanover, New Jersey)
- College: Princeton (1975–1978)
- NBA draft: 1978: 9th round, 171st overall pick
- Drafted by: New Jersey Nets
- Playing career: 1978–1979
- Position: Forward

Career history
- 1978–1979: Tempus

Career highlights
- Ivy League Player of the Year (1977); 2× First team All-Ivy League (1977, 1978)
- Stats at Basketball Reference

Frank Sowinski is an American former professional basketball player. He played college basketball for the Princeton Tigers and was selected as the Ivy League Player of the Year as a junior in 1977. Sowinski played professionally in Europe before he returned to the United States and embarked on a business career.

== Early life ==
Sowinski was born in North Arlington, New Jersey, and moved to East Hanover, New Jersey, at the age of two. His grandparents were coal miners in northeast Pennsylvania who Sowinski visited frequently as a child. His interest in basketball began when he was in the sixth grade and read the book A Sense of Where You Are (1965) by John McPhee about Princeton basketball player Bill Bradley. Sowinski constructed his first basketball hoop by using a corroded pipe found in a junkyard and practiced for hours in the driveway of his home.

== High school career ==
Sowinski did not make the varsity basketball team at Hanover Park High School until his junior year and began to travel to leagues in East Orange, New Jersey, to improve against better competition. Sowinski was noticed by Princeton assistant coach Gary Walters at a county tournament game in his senior year when he went 8-of-10 from the field, out-rebounded the other team and limited the leader scorer in the county to 8 points. Princeton head coach Pete Carril scouted Sowinski at a game when he had limited playing time due to foul trouble and instead focused his efforts on encouraging his teammates from the bench. Sowinski recollected: "My mom went up to Coach Carril and said, 'I guess you're not interested in him anymore' ... and he said, 'When I saw him on the bench, I wanted him more.'"

Sowinski had interest from Delaware Blue Hares, Lafayette Leopards and the Lehigh Mountain Hawks but chose to join the Princeton Tigers.

== College career ==
Sowinski led the Princeton Tigers freshman team with 19.0 points and 9.5 rebounds per game. He scored in double figures in every game he played as a sophomore during the 1975–76 season.

Sowinski was selected as the Ivy League Player of the Year in 1977 and earned nominations to the All-Ivy League first team in 1977 and 1978. He helped the Princeton Tigers to win Ivy League championships in 1976 and 1977. Sowinski worked out with Bill Bradley during the offseasons of his sophomore and junior years.

== Professional career ==
Sowinski was selected by the New Jersey Nets in the 1978 NBA draft. He attended rookie training camp with the Nets in August 1978 but signed a contract with the Tempus team in Madrid, Spain, before regular season training began. Sowinski also played with a touring team of American players in Italy.

== Post-playing career ==
Sowinski returned to the United States and earned his Master's in Business Administration from the University of Virginia that launched him into a successful business career. He worked at Amerada Hess for three years. Sowinski then joined Dun & Bradstreet where he worked for 17 years and rose to the position of company president. He worked as a chief financial officer with PricewaterhouseCoopers and helped in selling the business to IBM in 2002.

Sowinski has run a career mentorship program for the basketball teams at Princeton since 2008. He chairs the Princeton Varsity Club.
