= Eldridge M. Moores =

American geologist (1938–2018)

- Born: October 13, 1938; Phoenix, Arizona, U.S.
- Died: October 28, 2018 (aged 80); Quincy, California, U.S.
- Education: California Institute of Technology (B.S.); Princeton (Ph.D.)
- Awards: Doctor of Science (Honoris Causa), College of Wooster (1996); Distinguished Service Award, Geological Society of America (1988); Fellow, American Association for the Advancement of Science (1992); Geological Association of Canada Medal (1994); Fellow, California Academy of Sciences (1996); Honorary Fellow, Geological Society of London (1997); Geological Society of America/International Division Distinguished Career Award (2006)
- Scientific career
- Fields: Tectonics
- Institutions: University of California, Davis
- Doctoral advisor: Harry Hess

Eldridge Moores (October 13, 1938 – October 28, 2018) was an American geologist. He specialized in the understanding of ophiolites (fragments of oceanic crust and mantle that have been emplaced onto the continental crust) and the geology of the continental crust of the Western United States and Tethyan belt, the geology of Greece, Cyprus, and Pakistan, and the tectonic development of the Sierra Nevada and the Alpine - Himalayan systems.

Moores was Distinguished Professor Emeritus of Geology at the University of California, Davis.

In 1996, Moores was President of the Geological Society of America (GSA) and editor of the society's journal Geology from 1981 to 1989. He is the recipient of the GSA's Distinguished Service Award and the Geological Association of Canada Medal.

Together with geologist Robert J. Twiss, Moores co-authored two textbooks: Tectonics and Structural Geology

Moores is the main subject of the John McPhee book on California geology, Assembling California (1993), as well as McPhee's Annals of the Former World (1998).

In 2013, Eldridge Moores was awarded the title of UC Davis distinguished professor emeritus. This title is awarded annually by the UC Davis Emeriti Association on the basis of outstanding contributions following retirement in the traditional areas of teaching, research and service.

He died unexpectedly on Sunday, 28 October 2018, in Quincy, California, on a field trip he was leading in the northern Sierra Nevada foothills.

== Bibliography ==
- Eldridge M. Moores, Robert J. Twiss (1995) Tectonics (W. H. Freeman)
- Robert J. Twiss, Eldridge M. Moores, (December 15, 2006) Structural Geology 2nd edition, (W. H. Freeman)
- Eldridge M. Moores (Editor)(2003) Volcanoes and Earthquakes (Discoveries).
- Lauret E. Savoy, Eldridge M. Moores, and Judith E. Moores, editors, (2006) Bedrock: Writers on the Wonders of Geology (Trinity University Press)
- Carol S. Prentice, Judith G. Scotchmoor, Eldridge M. Moores, John P. Kiland (Editors) (2006) 1906 San Francisco Earthquake Centennial Field Guide (Geological Society of America)
- Richard Rodriguez, Sandra Phillips, Aaron Betsky, Eldridge Moores, Eldridge M. Moores (1996) Crossing the Frontier: Photographs of the Developing West, 1849 to the Present (Chronicle Book)
- Yildirim Dilek, Eldridge M. Moores, Don Elthon, and Adolphe Nicolas (editors) (2001) Ophiolites and Oceanic Crust: New Insights from Field Studies and the Ocean Drilling Program (Special Paper of the Geological Society of America)
