= Philip Hyde (photographer) =

American landscape photographer

Philip Hyde (1921–2006) was an American landscape photographer and conservationist. His photographs of the American West were used in more environmental campaigns than those of any other photographer.

== Education ==
Hyde first attended Ansel Adams' photography program at the California School of Fine Arts, now the San Francisco Art Institute, beginning with the Summer Session in 1946 and enrolling in the full-time professional photography training, the first of its kind, in the Fall of 1947, studying under photographers such as Edward Weston, Minor White, Imogen Cunningham and Dorothea Lange. Out of thousands of Ansel Adams' students, Hyde was one of the few Ansel Adams asked to teach with him.

== Career with the Sierra Club ==
Hyde became a contributing photographer for the Sierra Club Annual in 1950. He photographed for This is Dinosaur: Echo Park Country and Its Magic Rivers, a 1955 book edited by Wallace Stegner highlighting a proposed dam on the Green River in Dinosaur National Monument in Utah and Colorado.

Hyde eventually became the primary conservation photographer for the Sierra Club. David Brower commissioned him to photograph for what came to be known as "battle books", that helped the Sierra Club lead a coalition of environmental groups to establish or expand numerous national parks, wilderness areas and national seashores. This series of books the Sierra Club called The Exhibit Format Series. The most well-known photographers for the series were Ansel Adams, Eliot Porter and Philip Hyde. The Exhibit Format Series helped bring national attention to the Sierra Club and the cause of conservation and popularized the coffee table photography book paving the way for thousands of books of this type in the years since.

In the late 1950s and early 1960s, the US Bureau of Reclamation proposed two dams in the Colorado River on either end of the Grand Canyon. The Sierra Club published a book called Time and the River Flowing: Grand Canyon in 1964 in a successful campaign to turn public opinion against these dam projects that threatened the integrity of the wild river and its canyon. Hyde was the primary photographer. This book reshaped the image of the Grand Canyon for Americans and triggered an outpouring of support and letters from all over the world to prevent the flooding of the canyon. Hyde's photographs appeared in campaigns to create North Cascades National Park, Redwood National Park, Point Reyes National Seashore, High Sierra wilderness, the Wind River Range, Canyonlands, islands off Puerto Rico, Big Sur, Kings Canyon, Sequoia National Park, Denali National Park, Tongass National Forest, the Navajo Tribal Parks, the Oregon Cascades, and many other national treasures.

Hyde said, "For every place there will always be people that want to exploit it, and there will always be people—hopefully—that want to save it and keep it as it is. Even with the risk of inviting the crowds into paradise, better to publish your photographs and rally the troops. What’s in the frame of the photograph matters artistically, to be sure, but what’s outside the frame can destroy it."

== Color Photography ==
Hyde began making color photographs in 1948. In 1949, the California School of Fine Arts photography department supplemented its usual black and white training with a color photography class that Philip Hyde attended. The Sierra Club Exhibit Format Series began to introduce color photography to their books in 1962. In Wildness Is The Preservation of the World by Eliot Porter was entirely in color and Island In Time: The Point Reyes Peninsula contained a significant number of color photographic reproductions. Philip Hyde's color photographs also appeared in Time and The River Flowing: Grand Canyon, Navajo Wildlands and other Sierra Club books before the 1970s. After spending time in the desert and discovering improvements in the dye transfer printing process, in the 1970s Hyde gradually transitioned completely away from black-and-white photography to focus solely on color. He collaborated with author Edward Abbey on the desert classic, "Slickrock: The Canyon Country of Southeast Utah," (1971) yet another Sierra Club book published to highlight the threats to wilderness, in this case, the Utah Redrock country of Canyonlands National Park, Capitol Reef National Park, and the Escalante River wilderness.

== Publications ==
Hyde had 15 books of his own work and contributions to more than 70 others. In those following he was the primary illustrator:

- 2009: The Ghosts of Glen Canyon: History Beneath Lake Powell by C. Gregory Crampton Foreword by Edward Abbey
- 1992: The Range of Light by Philip Hyde with Selections from John Muir - ISBN 0-87905-480-8
- 1991: Sierra Club: 100 Years of Protecting Nature by Tom Turner; Sierra Club Books
- 1987, 1990: Drylands: The Deserts of North America text and photographs by Philip Hyde - ISBN 0-517-03289-9
- 1982: Images of the Southwest (Dye Transfer Color Portfolio)
- 1980: State Parks Of California: From 1864 to the Present by Joseph Engbeck
- 1979: Glen Canyon Portfolio - ISBN 0-87358-187-3
- 1979: Voices for the Earth by Harold Gilliam; Sierra Club Books
- 1976: A Trace of Desert Waters: The Great Basin Story by Samuel B. Houghton
- 1973: Mountain and Desert (Sierra Club Limited Edition Lithograph Portfolio)
- 1972: The Beautiful Southwest
- 1971, 1987: Slickrock: The Canyon Country of Southeast Utah by Edward Abbey and Philip Hyde; Sierra Club Books - ISBN 0-87156-051-8
- 1971: Alaska: The Great Land by Mike Miller and Peggy Wayburn; Sierra Club Books
- 1971: The Wilderness World of the Grand Canyon by Ann and Myron Sutton
- 1971: The Pursuit of Wilderness by Paul Brooks
- 1971: An Island Called California
- 1970: Glen Canyon Before Lake Powell
- 1969: The Grand Colorado: The Story of a River and Its Canyons Foreword by Wallace Stegner, by T. H. Watkins and others.
- 1968: South of Yosemite: Selected Writings of John Muir ed. by Frederic R. Gunsky
- 1967: Navajo Wildlands: As Long as the Rivers Shall Run by Stephen C. Jett, with selections from Willa Cather and others. Edited by Kenneth Brower with a foreword by David Brower. Sierra Club Exhibit Format Series.
- 1965: Not Man Apart: Photographs of the Big Sur Coast poetry by Robinson Jeffers; photographs by Philip Hyde, Wynn Bullock, Cedrick Wright, Edward Weston, Morley Baer, Ansel Adams, William Garnett, Eliot Porter, Cole Weston, Don Worth and others. Sierra Club Exhibit Format Series.
- 1965: National Parks of the West
- 1965: The Wild Cascades: Forgotten Parkland by Harvey Manning, photographs by Philip Hyde, Ansel Adams, Martin Litton, Bob and Ira Spring, David Simmons, John Warth and others. Sierra Club Exhibit Format Series.
- 1964: Time and the River Flowing: Grand Canyon by Francois Leydet, photographs by Philip Hyde, Ansel Adams, Eliot Porter, Martin Litton, Clyde Childress, Richard Norgaard, P. T. Reilly, Joseph Wood Krutch, Katie Lee and others. Sierra Club Exhibit Format Series.
- 1964: Wildlands in our Civilization
- 1963: The Last Redwoods: Photographs and Story of a Vanishing Scenic Resource by Philip Hyde and François Leydet; Foreword by Stewart L. Udall. Sierra Club Exhibit Format Series.
- 1962, 2nd ed. 1973: Island In time: The Point Reyes Peninsula by Harold Gilliam. Sierra Club Books
- 1961: Wilderness: America’s Living Heritage
- 1960: A Climber’s Guide to Glacier National Park Sierra Club Books.
- 1955: This Is Dinosaur: Echo Park Country and Its Magic Rivers ed. by Wallace Stegner photographs by Philip Hyde, Martin Litton and others. Sierra Club Books.
- 1951: Sierra Club Annual Sierra Club Books.

Hyde's last interview was featured in "Lasting Light: 125 Years of Grand Canyon Photography" by Stephen Trimble. A profile and portfolio appeared in "The Golden Decade: Photography at the California School of Fine Arts 1945-55", pages 187-197.
