= The Control of Nature =

1989 book by John McPhee

- Author: John McPhee
- Language: English
- Genre: Nonfiction
- Publisher: Farrar, Straus, and Giroux
- Publication date: 1989
- Publication place: United States
- Media type: Print (Hardcover and Paperback)
- Pages: 272 pp
- ISBN: 0-374-12890-1

The Control of Nature is a 1989 nonfiction book by John McPhee that chronicles three attempts to control natural processes that had varying success. The book combines three long essays previously published in The New Yorker: "Atchafalaya", "Cooling the Lava", and "Los Angeles Against the Mountains". These respectively describe the Old River Control Structure regulating inflow to the Atchafalaya River; the Eldfell volcanic eruption of 1973; and debris flow from the San Gabriel Mountains.

== Background ==
In 1980, McPhee traveled with his daughter on a canoe trip on the Atchafalaya River due to her fascination with the novelist Walker Percy. He had conversations with natives about the efforts made by the Army Corps of Engineers in monitoring riverflow in the area. In Vicksburg, Mississippi, a man recommended to McPhee that he research the efforts being undergone to control the debris sliding down from mountains into Los Angeles. When he visited California, a geologist informed him about lava in Iceland.

The book's title is derived from a sign on the engineering building at the University of Wyoming. Though he believes nature will win, "my book is not an editorial," McPhee said. "It is a description of people defying nature. They may have no choice." Like all of McPhee's books, The Control of Nature started out as an outline that he proceeded to fill in.

== Synopsis ==
The book begins by describing how the Atchafalaya River drains 30 percent of the Mississippi River at its source 300 miles upriver from New Orleans. Thanks to its steeper gradient and more direct route, the Atchafalaya seeks to change the course of the Mississippi as has happened in its long geological history. Due to the Mississippi's vital importance to industry, the Army Corps of Engineers constructed a control structure at the Atchafalaya's source to prevent this from occurring and to maintain the 30 percent drainage. McPhee explains how Morgan City, Louisiana would be destroyed if the river's banks increase. Three million cubic feet of water would inundate the town in the case of a hundred-year flood, though the Corps of Engineers has been trying its hardest to build a more stable flood structure.

== Publication and reception ==
All three essays that comprise "The Control of Nature" originally appeared in The New Yorker. After its publication as a book in 1989, The Control of Nature was McPhee's second-best selling book, after Coming into the Country. It received generally positive reviews from book critics.

Los Angeles Times critic Jack Miles praised McPhee's "knack of presenting even the most ordinary folks in their best, most ingenious moments." He liked "Los Angeles Against the Mountains" the most out of the three essays. He enjoyed how McPhee explained scientific and engineering concepts so a layperson could understand them.

Martin Ruess, writing in Technology and Culture, thought that McPhee should have added more interpretation to his descriptions. "McPhee has the poet's knack for the telling point, the metaphor that incisively leads to greater understanding," Ruess wrote. He believed that McPhee underestimated humanity's ability to exert its control on natural settings, since the U.S. infrastructure effectively did this. Ruess concluded that "McPhee's reports from the battlefronts are not as valuable as their implicit message that the control of nature is not nearly as important as knowing one's place in it."
