= Great Spruce Head Island =

Island in Hancock County, Maine, United States

Coordinates: 44°14′10″N 68°49′30″W

Great Spruce Head Island is a privately owned island in Penobscot Bay, Maine, United States. It is part of Deer Isle town in Hancock County. It has long belonged to the family of the painter Fairfield Porter and his brother photographer Eliot, both of whom did creative work there. For example, Eliot's book Summer Island (1966) is a visual tribute to the island. The Porters' brother-in-law Michael W. Straus also summered here.
