= John Culliney =

American biologist

John L. Culliney is an American biologist, a retired professor of biology and marine biology at Hawaii Pacific University.

== Background ==
Culliney is a graduate of Yale and Duke universities and holds a doctorate in zoology. He has taught biology and marine science in Hawai‘i since 1978 and has authored four books on subjects ranging from the North American continental shelf to the horticulture of native Hawaiian plants. He lives on the island of Hawaii.

== Works ==
=== Publications - Books ===
- 2006 ISLANDS IN A FAR SEA: The Fate of Nature in Hawai`i (Revised Edition). University of Hawai`i Press, Honolulu. 420 p.
- 1999 A NATIVE HAWAIIAN GARDEN: How to Grow and Care for Island Plants. University of Hawai`i Press, Honolulu. (with B.P. Koebele). 140 p.
- 1988 ISLANDS IN A FAR SEA: Nature and Man in Hawaii. Sierra Club Books, San Francisco. 410 p.
- 1981 LESA MORYA ( The Forests of the Sea) – Russian Edition. Hydrometeorological Press, Leningrad. 280 p.
- 1980 EXPLORING UNDERWATER:The Sierra Club Guide to Scuba and Snorkeling. Sierra Club Books, San Francisco. 340 p. (with E.S. Crockett).
- 1979 THE FORESTS OF THE SEA – Anchor Books (softcover) Edition. Anchor Press/Doubleday, Garden City, N.Y. 433 p.
- 1977 THE FORESTS OF THE SEA: Life and Death on the Continental Shelf. Sierra Club Books, San Francisco. 290 p.

=== Publications - Professional Articles – Marine Biology ===
- 1976 Larval development of the deep water wood-boring bivalve, Xylophaga atlantica Richards (Mollusca, Bivalvia, Pholadidae). Ophelia 15 (2): 149-161 (with R.D. Turner).
- 1975 Comparative larval development of the shipworms Bankia gouldi and Teredo navalis. Marine Biology 29: 245–251.
- 1975 Nitrogen fixation in marine shipworms. Science 187 (4176): 551–552.with - E.S. Carpenter
- 1975 New approaches and techniques for studying bivalve larvae. pp. 257–271 in Smith, W. and M.Chanley (Eds.) Culture of Marine Invertebrate Animals. Plenum, New York, N.Y. 338 p. (with P.J. Boyle and R.D. Turner).
- 1974 Larval development of the giant scallop, Placopecten magellanicus (Gmelin) Biol. Bull. 147: 321–332.
- 1973 Settling of larval shipworms, Teredo navalis and Bankia gouldi, stimulated by humic material (Gelbstoff). pp. 822–829 in Materials in the Sea: Proc. Third Intl. Congr. on Marine Corrosion and Fouling. Northwestern Univ. Press, Evanston. 1,031 p.
- 1973 The biologist's view of the Teredinidae and their control (with a documentary film on Teredo life history). pp. 83–87, Ibid. (with Ruth D. Turner).
- 1972 Cinemicrographic studies of crawling behavior in larval and juvenile bivalves. Bull. Amer. Malacological. Union (1971), p. 29.
- 1971 Laboratory rearing of the larvae of the mahogany date mussel, Lithophaga bisulcata. Bull. Mar. Sci. 21 (2): 591–602.
- 1971 Thoughts on National Parks (guest editorial). Bioscience 21 (16): 843.
- 1971 Some anatomical and life history studies of wood-boring bivalve systematics. Bull. Amer. Malacological Union (1970), pp. 65–66. (with R.D. Turner).
- 1970 Measurements of reactive phosphorus associated with pelagic Sargassum in the Northwest Sargasso Sea. Limnol. Oceanogr. 15 (2): 304–306.

=== Publications - Reviews and Essays ===
- 2007 Primeval Kailua (5 essays in a book-length work as yet untitled, commissioned by the Kailua Historical Society, Kailua, Hawai`i).
- 2000 The fractal self and the organization of nature: The Daoist sage and chaos theory. Asian Culture Quarterly 28 (3): 59–70. (with David Jones)
- 1998 Confucian order at the edge of chaos: The science of complexity and ancient wisdom. Zygon: The Journal of Science and Religion 33 (4): 395–404. (with David Jones)
- 1998 "Seal" and "Whale": Articles for Encarta Reference Suite 99. Microsoft Corp. Bellevue, Washington.
- 1994 Book Reviews: (Stafford-Dietsch, J. Reef: A Safari Through the Coral World. Sierra Club Books, San Francisco. 1993. Also, Taylor, L. Sharks of Hawaii: Their Biology and Cultural Significance. Univ. of Hawaii Press, Honolulu. 1993) In: MANOA 6 (2): 271–274.
- 1992 Essay: "Hawaii at the Edge," pp. 168–185, In: F. Stewart, (ed.) A World Between Waves. Island Press, Washington, D.C.
- 1989 Descriptive essays on Hawaii National Parks: "Haleakala" and "Hawaii Volcanoes," pp. 218–233, In: National Geographic's Guide to the National Parks of the United States. National Geographic Society, Washington, D.C.
