= David Brower =

American environmentalist (1912–2000)

- Born: David Ross Brower; July 1, 1912; Berkeley, California, U.S.
- Died: November 5, 2000; Berkeley, California
- Occupations: Conservationist, mountaineer
- Known for: Presidency of the Sierra Club Foundation, Founding Friends of the Earth, Earth Island Institute
- Spouse: Anne Hus Brower
- Children: Kenneth Brower, Robert Brower, Barbara Brower, John Brower
- Awards: Blue Planet Prize (1998)
- Military career
- Allegiance: United States
- Branch: United States Army
- Rank: Lieutenant (U.S. Army); Major (Army National Guard)
- Units: U.S. Army 10th Mountain Division; U.S. Army Reserve
- Conflicts: World War II
- Awards: Bronze Star Medal
- Other work: Conservationist

David Ross Brower (/ˈbraʊ.ər/ BROW-ər; July 1, 1912 – November 5, 2000) was a prominent environmentalist and the founder of many environmental organizations, including the John Muir Institute for Environmental Studies (1997), Friends of the Earth (1969), Earth Island Institute (1982), North Cascades Conservation Council, and Fate of the Earth Conferences. From 1952 to 1969, he served as the first Executive Director of the Sierra Club, and served on its board three times: from 1941–1953; 1983–1988; and 1995–2000 as a petition candidate enlisted by reform-activists known as the John Muir Sierrans. As a younger man, he was a prominent mountaineer.

== Early life ==
Brower was born in Berkeley, California. He was married to Anne Hus Brower (1913–2001) whom he met when they were both editors at the University of California Press in Berkeley. Anne was the daughter of Francis L M. Hus and Frances Hus (1876–1952), while Frances was the daughter of John P. Irish.

Kenneth Brower, David Brower's son, has authored a number of books, most notably The Starship and the Canoe about Freeman Dyson and his son George Dyson.

== Mountaineering achievements ==
Beginning his career as a world-class mountaineer with more than 70 first ascents to his credit, Brower came to the environmental movement through his interest in mountaineering. In 1933, Brower spent seven weeks in the High Sierra with George Rockwood. After a close call with a loose rock while climbing in the Palisades, he met Norman Clyde in the wilderness, who gave him some valuable climbing lessons. On that trip he also met Hervey Voge, who persuaded him to join the Sierra Club. On May 18, 1934, along with Voge, he began a ten-week climbing trip through the High Sierra, to survey climbing routes and maintain mountaineering records for the club. Previously, they had established several food caches along their planned route, which began at Onion Valley and ended at Tuolumne Meadows. In all, the pair climbed 63 peaks on this trip, including 32 first ascents. On the first day, they climbed Mount Tyndall, Mount Williamson, and Mount Barnard. From June 23 to 26, the pair made eight first ascents in the Devils Crags along with Norman Clyde, and also climbed Mount Agassiz. Clyde called the Devils Crag climbs "one of the most remarkable mountaineering feats ever accomplished in the United States". In the Palisades range, the pair climbed Thunderbolt Peak, traversed to North Palisade by way of Starlight Peak, and descended the U-Notch Couloir. In the Sawtooth Range, they climbed The Doodad, the West Tooth, and Matterhorn Peak.

Following a failed attempt in 1935 to make the first ascent of the remote, icy Mount Waddington in British Columbia, with a Sierra Club group, Brower added winter climbing to his expertise and made multiple first winter ascents of peaks in the Sierra Nevada.

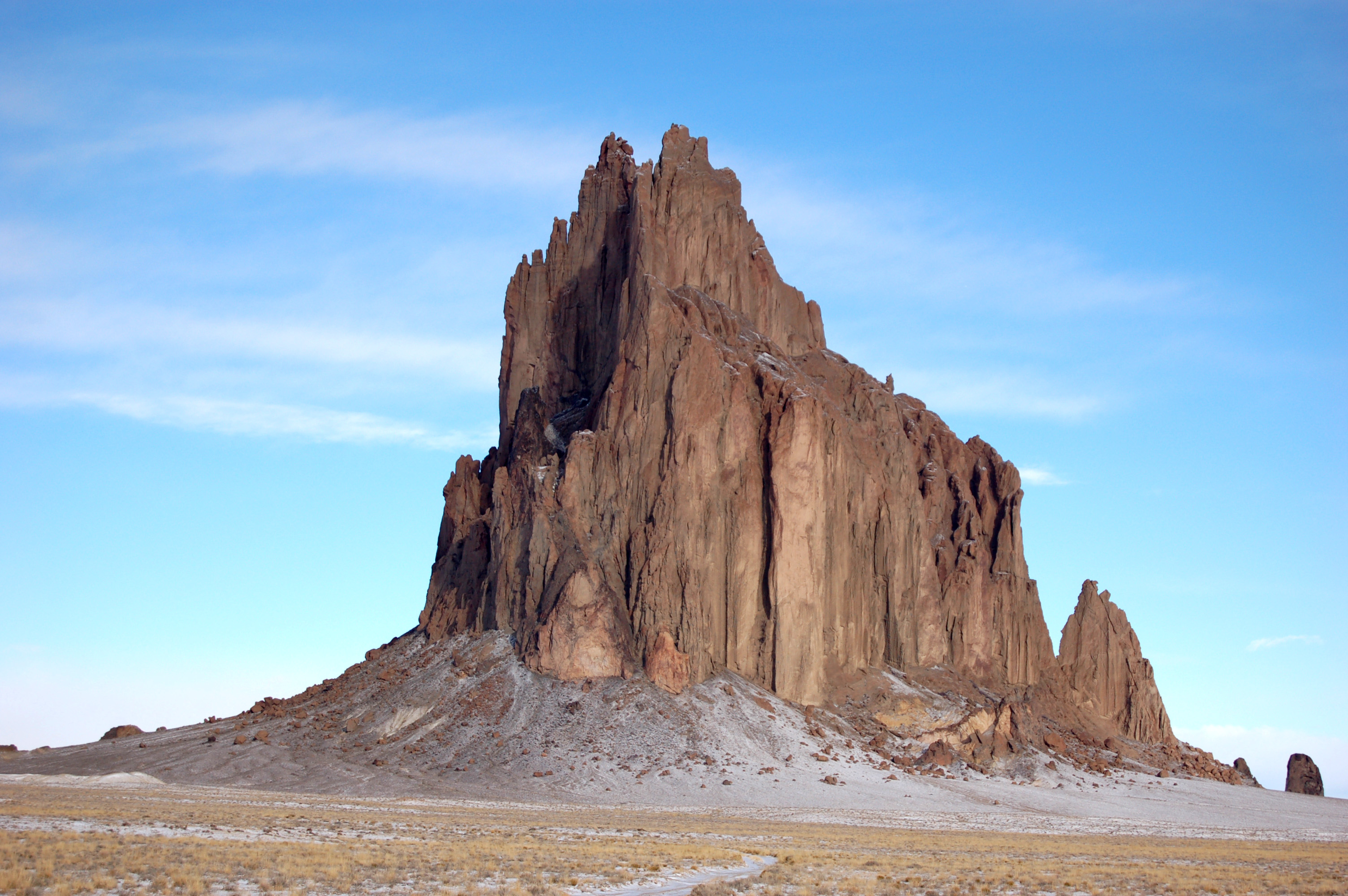
Shiprock, first climbed by David Brower and friends in 1939

From October 9 to 12, 1939, a Sierra Club climbing team including Brower, along with Bestor Robinson, Raffi Bedayn, and John Dyer, completed the first ascent of Shiprock, the erosional remnant of the throat of a volcano with nearly vertical walls on the Navajo reservation in northwestern New Mexico. This climb, rated YDS III, 5.7 A2, was the first in the United States to use expansion bolts for protection.

Twelve previous attempts on Shiprock had failed, and it was known as "the last great American climbing problem". The Brower party's success was described as an "outstanding effort" by "probably the only group on the continent capable of making the climb". Though there is no photographic evidence.

Brower made the first ascent of seventy routes in Yosemite and elsewhere in the western United States.

== World War II ==
In 1942, Brower edited and contributed to the Manual of Ski Mountaineering, published by the University of California Press and Cambridge University Press for use in training Allied mountain combat troops during World War II. Techniques described in this book were used by U.S. forces in the battles in the North Apeninnes and the Lake Garda Alps. The book was published in three later revised editions.

During World War II, he served as a lieutenant in the 10th Mountain Division, training its soldiers in mountaineering and cross-country skiing in Vermont and the state of Washington and earning a Bronze Star in action in Italy. Brower's role in the 10th Mountain Division is featured in the documentary film Fire on the Mountain. He served as a major in the Army Reserve for many years after the war ended.

== Career with Sierra Club ==
After the war, Brower returned to his job at the University of California Press, and began editing the Sierra Club Bulletin in 1946. He managed the Sierra Club annual High Trips from 1947 to 1954. Brower was named the first executive director of the Sierra Club in 1952, and joined the fight against the Echo Park Dam in Utah's Dinosaur National Monument. Taking advantage of his background in publishing, Brower rushed This is Dinosaur – edited by Wallace Stegner with photographs by Martin Litton and Philip Hyde – into press with publisher Alfred Knopf. Conservationists successfully lobbied Congress to delete Echo Park Dam from the Colorado River Storage Project in 1955, and the Sierra Club received much of the credit.

=== Coffee table books ===
Brower began Sierra Club Books' Exhibit Format book series with This is the American Earth in 1960, followed by the highly successful In Wildness Is the Preservation of the World, with color photographs by Eliot Porter in 1962. These coffee-table books sold well and introduced the Sierra Club to new members interested in wilderness preservation. Brower published two new titles a year in the series, but they began to lose money for the organization after 1964, though many claim they were the primary cause of the Club's extraordinary growth and rise to national prominence. Financial management began to be a bone of contention between Brower and the Club's board of directors.

=== Membership rises, revenues drop ===
Under Brower's leadership from 1952 to 1969, the club's membership expanded tenfold, from 7,000 to 70,000 members, becoming the nation’s leading environmental membership organization. Building on the biennial Wilderness Conferences which the Club launched in 1949 together with The Wilderness Society, Brower helped the Club win passage of the Wilderness Act in 1964. Brower and the Sierra Club also led a major battle to stop the Bureau of Reclamation from building two dams that would flood portions of the Grand Canyon. In 1964, Brower organized a dory river expedition led by Martin Litton with Philip Hyde and author Francois Leydet. The trip led to the book Time and The River Flowing which galvanized public opposition to the dams. In June 1966, the Club placed full-page ads in the New York Times and the Washington Post asking: "Should we also flood the Sistine Chapel so tourists can get nearer the ceiling?" The campaign brought in many new members. The Internal Revenue Service announced it was suspending the Club's non-profit 501(c)(3) charitable organization status. The board had set up the Sierra Club Foundation as an alternative for tax-deductible contributions, but revenues to the Club dropped, despite victories in blocking the Grand Canyon dams and a considerable increase in membership.

=== Board conflict and resignation ===
As annual deficits increased, tension grew between Brower and the Sierra Club board of directors. Another conflict grew over the Club's position on the Diablo Canyon Power Plant planned for construction by Pacific Gas and Electric (PG&E) near San Luis Obispo, California. The Club had played a major role in blocking PG&E's plan for a nuclear power plant at Bodega Bay in the early 1960s, but that campaign had centered on the earthquake danger from the nearby San Andreas Fault, not out of opposition to nuclear power itself. The Club's board of directors had voted to support the Diablo Canyon site for the power plant in exchange for PG&E's moving its initial site from the environmentally sensitive Nipomo Dunes. In 1967, a membership referendum upheld the board's policy. Brower had come to believe that nuclear power was a dangerous mistake at any location, and he publicly voiced his opposition to Diablo Canyon, in defiance of the Club's official policy.

Sierra Club board elections in the late 1960s produced sharply defined pro- and anti-Brower factions. In 1968, Brower's supporters won a majority, but in 1969, anti-Brower candidates won all five open positions. Brower was charged with financial recklessness and insubordination by two of his former close friends, photographer Ansel Adams and board president Richard Leonard. Brower's resignation was accepted by a board vote of ten to five.

=== Rejoins and resigns from board ===
Eventually reconciled with the Sierra Club, Brower was elected to the board of directors for a term from 1983 to 1988, and again from 1995 to 2000. Brower was deeply concerned about issues of overpopulation and immigration – one of many issues that led to his resignation in protest from the board of directors in 2000. "Overpopulation is perhaps the biggest problem facing us," he said, "and immigration is part of that problem. It has to be addressed." His favorite example of how immigration should be addressed was the work of his cousin Boone Hallberg, a botanist who immigrated to Oaxaca to build a more sustainable agricultural economy in the area that so many of the workers on his family's California farm had been forced to leave.

== Founds Friends of the Earth ==
Brower founded Friends of the Earth (FOE) in 1969, soon after resigning as executive director of the Sierra Club. The move came during a burst of public environmental concern generated by the first Earth Day in April 1970. FOE also benefited from the publicity generated by a series of articles in The New Yorker by John McPhee, later published as Encounters with the Archdruid, which recounted Brower's confrontations with a geologist and mining engineer, a resort developer, and Floyd Dominy, the director of the Bureau of Reclamation. Brower so enjoyed being called the Archdruid that he later used the term in his e-mail address.

FOE set up its headquarters in San Francisco, and opened an office in Washington, D.C. Brower soon spun off two new organizations from the FOE Washington staff: the League of Conservation Voters in 1970, founded by Marion Edey, and the Environmental Policy Center in 1971. Brower's international contacts led to the founding of FOE International in 1971, a loose federation of sister organizations in some forty-four countries. Brower also started a publications program at FOE, which had initial success with The Environmental Handbook in the wake of Earth Day, but then began to lose money.

=== Widens environmental campaigns ===
Although Brower's background was in the wilderness preservation wing of the conservation movement, he quickly led FOE to take on many of the issues raised by the new environmentalists. FOE campaigned against the Alaska pipeline, the supersonic transport airplane (SST), nuclear power, and the use of the defoliant Agent Orange in the Vietnam War. After Ronald Reagan was elected President in 1980, FOE led the opposition to Interior secretary James G. Watt's efforts to sell and lease public lands in the West and develop land adjacent to the National Parks.

=== Resigns from board ===
Brower retired as executive director of FOE on its tenth anniversary in 1979, but continued as chairman of its board of directors. FOE's growing debt and tension between Washington lobbying and grassroots action led to a crisis between Brower and a majority of the board that recalled his conflict with the Sierra Club board. Facing staff cuts in 1984, Brower appealed over the board directly to the membership for emergency contributions. He was removed from the board for insubordination, but was reinstated when he threatened a lawsuit. In 1985 the board voted to close the San Francisco office and move to Washington, D.C.. A referendum of the membership supported the board majority, and Brower resigned in 1986 to work through his Earth Island Institute.

== Later years with Earth Island Institute ==
Brower incorporated Earth Island Institute in 1982. After FOE moved its headquarters to Washington, D.C., in 1986, Brower developed Earth Island as a loosely structured incubator for innovative projects in ecology and social justice. Although he chaired the board of directors, Brower stayed in the background as co-directors David Philips and John Knox ran the organization. Projects were required to bring in their own funding, and often went their own way once well-established. Groups formed under Earth Island's umbrella include the Rainforest Action Network, the Environmental Project on Central America (EPOCA), and many others. Freed from administrative worries and budget controversies, Brower was able to continue to travel, speak and work on many of his long-standing concerns. In addition to his returning to the Sierra Club board for two separate terms, he also served on the Board of Directors for Native Forest Council from 1988 until his death in 2000. A supporter of Ralph Nader, Brower flew to Denver in June 2000 for the Green Party convention. The day before he died, Brower cast his absentee ballot for Nader. He died at his home in Berkeley, California, on November 5, 2000.

A monument, Spaceship Earth, was erected in his honor at Kennesaw State University. The monument is meant to serve as a reminder to future generations about the precious nature of the planet.

== See also ==
- David Brower Center
- Environmental history of the United States

== Bibliography ==
- Brower, David, For Earth's Sake: The Life and Times of David Brower (Salt Lake City: Gibbs-Smith, 1990). ISBN 0-87905-013-6
- Brower, David with Steve Chapple, Let the Mountains Talk, Let the Rivers Run (New York: HarperCollins, 1995). ISBN 0-06-251430-X
- Brower, David, & the Sierra Club, eds., Wilderness: America's Living Heritage (New York Vail-Ballou Press, Gillick Press, 1961).
- Cohen, Michael P., The History of the Sierra Club, 1892–1970 (San Francisco: Sierra Club Books, 1988). ISBN 0-87156-732-6
- Fox, Stephen, John Muir and His Legacy: The American Conservation Movement (Boston: Little, Brown, 1981). ISBN 0-316-29110-2
- McPhee, John, Encounters with the Archdruid (New York: Farrar, Straus and Giroux, 1971). ISBN 0-374-14822-8
- Turner, Tom, David Brower: The Making of the Environmental Movement (Berkeley: University of California Press, 2015).
- Wild, Peter (1978). "13: David Brower and Charisma: The Rebirth of the Conservation Movement". Pioneer Conservationists of Western America. Edward Abbey (Introduction). Missoula: Mountain Press Publishing. pp. 150–159. ISBN 0878421076.
- Wyss, Robert. The Man Who Built the Sierra Club: A Life of David Brower (New York: Columbia University Press, 2016). ISBN 978-0231164467

== Video resources ==
- For Earth's Sake: The Life and Times of David Brower. Produced in 1989 by John de Graaf in cooperation with KCTS-Seattle. Distributed by Bullfrog Films, Oley, PA 19547. 58 minutes.
- Monumental: David Brower's Fight for Wild America. Directed by Kelly Duane for Loteria Films, 2004. DVD, 78 min.
