= Encounters with the Archdruid =

1971 book by John McPhee

- cover painting: The Hetch-Hetchy Valley, California by Albert Bierstadt
- Author: John McPhee
- Subject: Narrative non-fiction
- Publisher: Farrar, Straus and Giroux
- Publication date: 1971
- Pages: 245
- ISBN: 0-374-51431-3

Encounters with the Archdruid (1971) is a narrative nonfiction book by author John McPhee. First published in early 1971 as a three-part series in The New Yorker, Encounters is split into three parts, each covering environmentalist David Brower's confrontations with his ideological enemies. The book chronicles his struggles against miners, developers and finally the United States Bureau of Reclamation. McPhee blends traditional journalism – the reporting of facts and accounting of events – with thematic elements more common to fiction. The book was generally well received in the popular press and became an enduring part of the portrait of David Brower.

== Synopsis ==
While notionally a profile of Brower, Encounters is broken into three sections. The first chronicles Brower's conflict with Charles Park, a mineral engineer hoping to find and exploit mineral reserves in Glacier Peak Wilderness. Charles Park is portrayed as calculating and pragmatic, unwilling to foreclose real economic value from current generations in order to leave the environment pristine for future generations. This pragmatic view is starkly contrasted with Brower's insistence that "I believe in wilderness for itself alone". McPhee facilitates or observes the dialogue between these two contrasted figures as he does for the other two sections in the book.

The second section introduces Charles Fraser, a real estate developer in Hilton Head Island, South Carolina. Fraser's characterization of environmentalists as modern druids who "worship trees and sacrifice human beings to those trees" provides the charge against Brower that forms the title of the book. Brower came to Georgia in order to stop Fraser's plan to develop Cumberland Island. Like Park, Fraser is depicted as nuanced and pragmatic: his vision of development is controlled and regulated land use. Fraser's development of Hilton Head Island is still considered a model for planned development and McPhee notes that Fraser considers himself a true conservationist. Brower would eventually win this battle, with a groundswell of opposition forcing Fraser to sell his development on Cumberland Island to the National Park Foundation.

The third section presents David Brower's unraveling. Here Brower battles Floyd Dominy, then the commissioner of the United States Bureau of Reclamation. Displaying only some of the reserve and pragmatism of the previous two figures, Dominy relished the damming of rivers, while Brower considered damming the ultimate offense. Brower struggled to save the Glen Canyon from being flooded by the Glen Canyon Dam but failed and as the story progresses, he is increasingly marginalized in the environmental movement for his perceived militancy. Wendy Nelson Espeland, in The Struggle for Water, argues that the Bureau carries much of the blame (or credit) for "radicalizing" Brower.

== Reception and influence ==
McPhee's catalog of these conflicts between the growing needs of society and the shrinking wilderness presaged what would become known as "wise use", or prescriptions for use that balance the existential value of the environment against societal needs. Encounters was positively received in both The New York Times and The Wall Street Journal. Time gave a positive review as well, noting the narrative similarities to a novel. The term "archdruid" stuck with Brower and was used appreciatively in many of his obituaries, including one McPhee wrote for him, when he died in 2000.
