= Jenny McPhee =

American novelist and translator (born 1961/62)

- Born: 1961 or 1962 (age 62–63)
- Education: Williams College
- Occupations: Novelist; translator
- Children: 2
- Parents: John McPhee (father); Pryde Brown (mother)
- Awards: Guggenheim Fellow (2020)

Jenny McPhee (born c. 1962) is an American novelist and translator. A 2020 Guggenheim Fellow, she has worked as a translator of Italian literature to English and wrote the novels The Center of Things (2001), No Ordinary Matter (2004), and A Man of No Moon (2007).

== Biography ==
Jenny McPhee was born circa 1962 to writer John McPhee and photographer Pryde Brown and raised in suburban New Jersey. She attended Princeton High School, before obtaining her BA in Williams College. In 1984, she was granted a Saint Andrew's Society of the State of New York Fellowship to continue her graduate studies in Scotland.

Originally a translator, she began in the 1990s with Italian-English translations such as Pope John Paul II's Crossing the Threshold of Hope (which she did alongside her sister Martha McPhee), as well as works from authors such as Natalia Ginzburg, Primo Levi, Giacomo Leopardi, Curzio Malaparte, Paolo Maurensig, Anna Maria Ortese, and Franco Quadri. In 2020, she was awarded a Guggenheim Fellowship in Translation. In 2021, she won the 2020 John Florio Prize runner-up prize for her translation of Curzio Malaparte's novel The Kremlin Ball.

After publishing the 2000 book Girls: Ordinary Girls and Their Extraordinary Pursuits with her sisters Martha and Laura McPhee, she started moving into novels, with her debut being The Center of Things (2001), about a tabloid reporter and her relationship with the husband of a celebrity whose obituary she is writing. She published another novel, No Ordinary Matter (2004), about a journey of two sisters searching for answers about their late father. In 2007, she published a third novel, A Man of No Moon.

In education, she has also taught subjects like creative writing and translation at New York University and Princeton University, and she has worked at the New York University School of Professional Studies as their Center for Applied Liberal Arts academic director. She has also served as a board member for the Bronx Academy of Letters in the South Bronx.

She has two sons with her spouse, all of whom she lives with in New York City.

== Works ==
- The Center of Things (2001)
- No Ordinary Matter (2004)
- A Man of No Moon (2007)
