= Gorgeous Lies =

2002 novel by Martha McPhee

- Author: Martha McPhee
- Language: English
- Genre: Relationships
- Published: 2002, Houghton Mifflin Harcourt
- Publication place: United States
- Pages: 336
- ISBN: 0-15-100613-X
- Preceded by: Bright Angel Time

Gorgeous Lies (2002) is a novel written by American author Martha McPhee. It is a sequel to her first book, Bright Angel Time.

== Synopsis ==
This book explores the life of Anton Furey, a charismatic therapist who is dying. It details the familial relationships during this time, which include his five grown kids from a former marriage, his wife's three grown kids from a former marriage, and the grown child they had together. That child -Alice - moves as an adult back to the farm (known as Chardin) where she was raised . While the family lived there – in a communal lifestyle – they got the reputation of being the new American "blended family", in a period of more frequent divorce and new families. Because of that, reporters and film crews took an interest, and documented their lives.

As Anton gets sicker, Alice and the other children find many emotions surfacing from the years spent at Chardin. Throughout this process, they start reliving the issues they had, and make new attempts to make peace with their father.

== Reception ==
Publishers Weekly wrote that it has "an offbeat writing style and poetic metaphors", but not all of the characters "are fully sketched". Michael Harris of the Los Angeles Times wrote, "[McPhee] avoids the extremes of hippie nostalgia and conservative revisionism and doesn't provide any simple answers". Harris describes her prose as "elegant and airy". Cathleen Medwick of O, The Oprah Magazine described the book as "an unusually strong novel [that] explores the wild frontier of domestic life." Bruce Bawer of The New York Times wrote, "If McPhee's first novel was a case of relatively orthodox storytelling, her second is a free-associative jumble of memory and emotion that makes the reader feel like a family therapist on marathon duty." Kirkus Reviews wrote, "Somewhat rambling, but fine work nevertheless: a moving portrait of a foolish, foul-hearted, but impossibly innocent man."
