= David Rains Wallace =

American writer (born 1945)

David Rains Wallace (born 1945) is an American writer who has published more than twenty books on conservation and natural history, including The Monkey's Bridge (a 1997 New York Times Notable Book) and The Klamath Knot (1984 Burroughs Medal). He has written articles for the National Geographic Society, The Nature Conservancy, the Sierra Club, and other groups. Wallace's work also has appeared in Harper's Magazine, The New York Times, Sierra, Wilderness and other periodicals.

== Early life ==
Wallace was born in Charlottesville, Virginia in 1945. He received a bachelor's degree with honors from Wesleyan University in Connecticut and a master's with honors from Mills College in California. He also undertook graduate work at Columbia University. Wallace lives in Berkeley, California.

== Writings ==
Wallace's writing came to prominence during the nature writing renaissance that arose with the burgeoning environmental movement in the 1970s. His first book, The Dark Range : A Naturalist's Night Notebook, an exploration of nocturnal natural history and ethology set in the Yolla Bolly-Middle Eel Wilderness of northern California, was written as an M.A. thesis at Mills College from 1972 to 1974. His second book, Idle Weeds: The Life of a Sandstone Ridge, about a year in a central Ohio natural area park, was written while he worked as a public information specialist at the Columbus Ohio Metropolitan Park District from 1975 to 1978.

Unlike contemporaries such as Edward Abbey who tended to identify mainly with more mainstream genres like the novel, he has continued to identify himself mainly as a non-fiction nature writer and his major books have been in that genre—the latest being Chuckwalla Land (2011), Articulate Earth (2014), and Mountains and Marshes (2015). Wallace has also been categorized as a science writer, and his work contains much scientific information, but it also has folkloric, philosophical, and religious dimensions. This has led to controversy, as when a March 20, 1983 New York Times Book Review piece on his third book, The Klamath Knot, by then Times reporter Clifford May, accused him of playing "fast and loose" with concepts like evolution and mythology, getting "caught up with what are apparently attempts to alchemize science into poetry." On the other hand, the eminent botanist and co-founder of the "neo-Darwinian synthesis," G. Ledyard Stebbins, described The Klamath Knot as: "A classic of natural history that will take its place alongside Walden and A Sand County Almanac."

Wallace has tried to couple his writing with conservation activism. He has been an advocate of parks, wildlife and wilderness protection in several areas, especially the Klamath/Siskiyou Mountains region of northwest California and southwest Oregon, the subject of four of his books (including the Klamath Knot) and Central America from Chiapas to Panama, the subject of three of his books (including The Monkey's Bridge). Biologist Daniel Janzen called his 1992 book, The Quetzal and the Macaw: The Story of Costa Rica's National Parks, "a major contribution to tropical conservation." His 2007 book, Neptune's Ark, explores the evolution of western North America's marine megafauna, one of the world's most important although less well known than terrestrial ones. His 2011 Chuckwalla Land explores the evolution of California's desert, which is still not well understood despite many theories about it. Botanist Bruce Pavlik called it "a clear and entertaining story about the origin of California's desert that invites the reader into a world of ancient mystery and modern revelation."

Much of Wallace's writing for periodicals has been on conservation issues. He has also written official National Park Handbooks for Redwood, Yellowstone, Mammoth Cave, and New River Gorge national parks. From 1998 until 2009, he served as a writer-consultant on a documentary film about the Klamath/Siskiyous by Stephen Fisher productions of Los Angeles. He has given talks, readings, and classes for local conservation organizations such as the Siskiyou Field Institute and Siskiyou Land Trust. He has taught nature writing at several universities.

After The Klamath Knot won the John Burroughs Medal for Nature Writing, The New York Times Book Review invited Wallace to contribute an article about nature writing. Published in the July 22, 1984 issue, the article is entitled "The Nature of Nature Writing." It stresses the genre's role as a source and manifestation of a growing conservation movement as Thoreau and Muir developed the idea of the national park in the nineteenth century, when the first parks were created, then as Rachel Carson, Aldo Leopold and others laid down the tenets of modern environmentalism in the twentieth century. "Nature writing is a historically recent literary genre, and in a quiet way, one of the most revolutionary ones. It's like a woodland stream that sometimes runs out of sight, buried in sand, but overflows into waterfalls farther downstream. It can be easy to ignore, but it keeps eroding the bedrock." The article notes that more nature writers are active than ever in the late twentieth century, but asks if—given the increasing pressures of population and economic growth—nature writers will continue to have as much effect as in the past. Wallace returned to this theme twenty years later, writing an article entitled "Has Success Spoiled Nature Writing?" which observes that, despite the proliferation of nature writers and the financial success of some, positive conservation indicators such as the creation of new national parks has not kept pace with nature writing's popularity. Wallace cites the failure of his own attempts to promote a new park in the Klamath/Siskiyou Mountains region, and maintains that other new parks are needed in areas like the Great Plains, which biologists regard as necessary for the long term preservation of wild bison. Perhaps significantly, The New York Times Book Review rejected the article, although the Los Angeles Times ran a shortened version of it entitled "The Waning Power of Nature's Priests" as an op-ed on November 28, 2004. The complete versions of both articles are published in Articulate Earth, Backcountry Press, 2014.

In an introduction to Wallace's 1986 book, The Untamed Garden, Ohio State University English Professor John Muste wrote: "Wallace, I think, is in love with the planet we inhabit and with those who share it with us, but his love his unsentimental. It includes the recognition that nature is not benign or hostile, it is itself, obeying no human laws... Wallace shows that the American landscape and most of its ecosystems have been altered irrevocably by what we have done to them and that we simply do not have anything like enough knowledge to have any idea of the long range effects of our tampering. At the same time, Wallace is no Jeremiah threatening us with destruction. He specifically rejects the role of the nature-elegist who weeps literary tears for natural changes. In a thoughtful essay on those who write about nature, he reminds us that the idea of nature as loser is a myth, once useful in the encouraging of the growth of civilization and of knowledge. But it is only a myth: 'Nature is not a loser because it is not a competitor.' There is a sanity in these essays that rejects easy formulations, whether elegiac or sanguine."

Wallace has worked in other literary genres, always from a conservation stance. Two novels are "ecothrillers" revolving around issues like endangered species and wilderness protection. Two books on evolutionary history, The Bonehunters' Revenge and Beasts of Eden, try to stress the importance of evolution as a matrix for the human past and future. The National Audubon Society and Wildlife Conservation Society commissioned two of Wallace's books, Life in the Balance and Adventuring in Central America as ways of informing the public on conservation concerns through television and ecotourism.

Wallace originally wanted to be a painter, then a filmmaker. His BA thesis was a study of illusion in the plays of August Strindberg and Ingmar Bergman. He worked as a teaching assistant at Columbia Film School in New York City and as a documentary film maker for WNET-TV. Nature writing deflected him from that course but he remains very interested in drama and film. Film companies have optioned two of his books. A work-in-progress is entitled Shakespeare's Wilderness.

== Books ==
- The Dark Range: A Naturalist's Night Notebook Sierra Club Books (1978)
- Idle Weeds: The Life of a Sandstone Ridge [Sierra Club] (1980)
- The Klamath Knot: Explorations in Myth and Evolution [Sierra Club] (1983)
- The Wilder Shore, Photographs by Moreley Baer [Sierra Club] (1984)
- The Turquoise Dragon; An Ecothriller [Sierra Club] (1985)
- The Untamed Garden and Other Personal Essays [Ohio State University, Macmillan] (1986)
- Life in the Balance: Companion to the Audubon Television Specials [Harcourt Brace Jovanovich] (1987)
- Bulow Hammock: Mind in a Forest [Sierra Club] (1988)
- The Vermilion Parrot: An Ecothriller [Sierra Club] (1991)
- The Quetzal and the Macaw, [Sierra Club] (1992)
- Redwood National Park Official Handbook [U.S. National Park Service] (1994)
- Adventuring in Central America [Sierra Club] (1994)
- Yellowstone National Park Official Handbook [U.S. National Park Service] (1997)
- The Monkey's Bridge [Sierra Club] (1997)
- The Bonehunter's Revenge: Dinosaurs, Greed and the Greatest Scientific Feud of the Gilded Age [Houghton Mifflin] (1999)
- Mammoth Cave National Park Official Handbook [U.S. National Park Service] (1999)
- The Klamath Knot [University of California Press] (2003)
- The Monkey's Bridge: Mysteries of Evolution in Central America (2007) Trinity University Press
- Beasts of Eden: Walking Whales, Dawn Horses, and Other Enigmas of Mammal Evolution (2005)
- Neptune's Ark University of California Press (2008)
- A Rare Botanical Legacy [Heyday Books] (2009)
- Chuckwalla Land: The Riddle of California's Desert [University of California] (2011)
- The New River Gorge: A Corridor in Time [Eastern National] (2013)
- Articulate Earth: Adventures in Ecocriticism (2014)
- Mountains and Marshes: Exploring the Bay Area's Natural History [Counterpoint Press] 2015
- Shakespeare's Wilderness [Amazon Create Space] 2017
- Freud and Shakespeare: A Lost Expedition [Kindle Paperback] 2020

== Anthologies ==
- A Republic of Rivers, [Oxford University Press], 1990.
- The Norton Anthology of Nature Writing, [W.W. Norton], 1990, 2000 editions.
- The Curious Naturalist, [National Geographic Society], 1991.
- Roots and Branches, [Mercury House], 1991.
- The Islands and the Sea, [Oxford University Press], 1991
- Nature's New Voices, [Fulcrum Publishing], 1992.
- Out Among the Wolves, [Alaska Northwest Books], 1993
- A Thousand Leagues of Blue, [Sierra Club], 1993
- American Nature Writing, 1994, [Sierra Club]
- The Nature of Nature, [Harcourt Brace Jovanovich], 1994
- The Presence of Whales, [Alaska Northwest Books], 1995
- American Nature Writing, 1995, [Sierra Club]
- Nature Travel, with Susanne Methvin and Dwight Holing, [Time Life Education], 1995
- A Walker's Companion, consultant editor, [Time Life Education], 1995
- The Writer's Notebook, [HarperCollins], 1995
- The World of Wilderness, [Roberts Rhinehart], 1995
- Reading the West: New Essays on the Literature of the American West, [Cambridge University Press], 1996.
- American Nature Writing, 1996, [Sierra Club]
- American Nature Writing, 1998, [Sierra Club]
- Central America: A Natural and Cultural History, [Yale University Press], 1998
- Gold Rush A Literary Exploration, [Heyday Books], 1998.
- Natural State: A Literary Anthology of California Nature Writing, [University of California Press], 1998
- Lucky Break: How I Became a Writer, [Heinemann], 1999
- American Safari, [Discovery Communications], 1999
- Backcountry Treks, [Discovery Communications], 1999
- Intricate Homeland: Collected Writings from the Klamath-Siskiyous,[Headwaters Press] 2000
- Unfolding Beauty: Celebrating California's Landscapes, [Heyday Books], 2000
- Rainforests, [Discovery Communications], 2007
- Califauna, [Heyday Books], 2007
- New California Writing, [Heyday Books], 2013
- The Once and Future Forest. [Heyday and Save the Redwoods League], 2018

== Introductions ==
- Drylands: The Deserts of North America, Photographs and Text by Philip Hyde, [Harcourt Brace Jovanovich] 1987
- The Forest and the Sea, Marston Bates, [Nick Lyons Books], 1988
- Travels in Alaska, John Muir, [Houghton Mifflin], 1998
- One Day at Beetle Rock, Sally Carrighar, [Heyday Books], 2002
- Nature's Beloved Son, Bonnie Gisel and Stephen Joseph, [Heyday Books], 2008

== Awards and Other Distinctions ==
- The Dark Range 1979 Commonwealth of California Silver Medal for Literature
- Idle Weeds 1981 Ohio Library Association Medal for Literature
- The Klamath Knot 1984 John Burroughs Medal, among other awards.
- The Klamath Knot 1984 Commonwealth Club of California Silver Medal for Literature
- Bulow Hammock 1989 Ohio Library Association Medal for Literature
- The Monkey's Bridge was a 1997 New York Times Notable Book.
- The Bonehunters' Revenge, PEN USA West Literary Award Research Nonfiction Finalist, 1997
- The Klamath Knot was included in the San Francisco Chronicles 1999 list of the twentieth century's best books published west of the Rockies
- Beasts of Eden was a 2004 New York Times Notable Book.
- Chuckwalla Land 2012 Commonwealth Club of California Gold Medal for Literature

== Fellowships ==
- National Endowment for the Arts Creative Writing Fellowship, 1979
- Fulbright Creative Writing Fellowship, 1990 (to write a history of Costa Rica's National Parks, published as The Quetzal the Macaw)

== Teaching ==
- Teaching Assistant, Columbia Film School, 1967–68
- Teaching Assistant, Mills College, 1972–74
- University of California, Berkeley Extension, instructor, 1988–1991
- Ohio State University at Columbus, visiting instructor 1993
- University of Oregon, Eugene, visiting lecturer, 1994, 1996
- Carleton College, Northfield Minnesota, Distinguished Visiting Writer, 2008
- University of California, Santa Cruz, graduate science seminar, 2010
