= Robert J. Twiss =

American geologist

Robert J. Twiss is an American geologist emeritus of University of California, Davis. He made his Ph.D. 1971 at Princeton University.

First in his career he researched viscosity of earth mantle. Nowadays he interests for the mechanisms and mechanics of rock deformation and the interpretation of connected structures.

Together with geologist Eldridge M. Moores he has co-authored two famous textbooks: Tectonics and Structural Geology.

== Bibliography ==
- Eldridge M. Moores, Robert J. Twiss (1995) Tectonics (W. H. Freeman)
- Robert J. Twiss, Moores, Eldridge M. (15 December 2006). Structural Geology. W. H. Freeman and Company. ISBN 978-0-7167-4951-6. OCLC 1025400345. OL 17925953M. Wikidata Q59386574.
