= The Klamath Knot =

The Klamath Knot is a 1983 work of natural history and memoir written by David Rains Wallace.

It is based on Wallace's many backpacking treks through the Klamath Mountains and specifically into the Siskiyou Wilderness. The book has become regionally appreciated as a "Klamath Cult Classic" because Wallace weaves the myth of giants with the mysterious quality of ancient forest evolution while accurately describing the region's unique natural history. The term "Klamath Knot" is now used synonymously with the Klamath Mountains of northwest California and southern Oregon, which is dissected by the Klamath River.

The Klamath Knot has been described as a "sleeper," a book that has had significant influence outside the "mainstream" of commercial publishing. Never a bestseller, it remains in print with University of California Press four decades after its original 1983 publication by Sierra Club Books (in collaboration with Yolla Bolly Press of Covelo, California), and has sold many thousands of copies. The San Francisco Chronicle and the Chicago Tribune included it in their lists of the best books of 1983. It was awarded the John Burroughs Medal for Nature Writing and a Commonwealth Club Silver Medal for Literature in the Californiana Category, both in 1984. In 1999, the San Francisco Chronicle included The Klamath Knot in its list of the twentieth century's 100 best books published west of the Rockies.

One reason for the book's influence is that it was the first to vividly describe a major but hitherto neglected and exploited bioregion of global importance. In 1992, the International Union for the Conservation of Nature identified the Klamath Mountains as one of seven areas of global biological significance in the United States, and one of 200 worldwide. The New Hampshire sized Klamath/Siskiyou bioregion in northwest California and southwest Oregon rivals the Sierra Nevada and Cascades as a locus of biodiversity and wilderness values-- and it has qualities less typical of those areas-- major salmon rivers and vital indigenous communities. But nineteenth century writers like John Muir largely ignored it, and the era of national parks creation largely passed it by because of that neglect. Its only national park system unit is the small Oregon Caves National Monument.

An even worse effect of this neglect was that it remained unprotected from logging, mining, and dams, which caused considerable damage, particularly after WW II, when the U.S. Forest Service characterized it as "ordinary mountain country" and clear cut much of it. The region still contains nine important wilderness areas, however, and local resistance to exploitation has grown. The Klamath Knot has served as a locus for conservation activism in the region: one prominent activist, Lou Gold, who founded the Siskiyou Field Institute, said the book "informed" him about the region. Catherine Caufield cited the book's influence of Gold in a 1980s New Yorker piece on temperate old growth forest conservation. Since the book's publication, the International Union for the Conservation of Nature and other organizations have acknowledged the Klamath/Siskiyou region's global significance, although attempts to place more of it in the national park system have met stubborn political resistance.

The book has been controversial at the national level. On its publication, two major scientists praised it. Botanist G. Ledyard Stebbins, a co-founder of the neo-Darwinian evolutionary paradigm, called it "A classic of natural history that will take its place alongside Walden and A Sand County Almanac." Zoologist George Schaller called it "a marvelous book, one of the finest nature essays I have read, beautifully written, full of stimulating ideas and insights." On the other hand, some readers found its synthesis of biology with folklore and philosophy disturbing. A March 20, 1983, review in the New York Times Book Review by then NYT reporter Clifford May manifested this view. While praising the book's natural history content, it accused Wallace of playing "fast and loose" with concepts like evolution and mythology "in a grab for cosmic significance" and of sinking "quickly and deeply into a mire of pretension" with "attempts to alchemize science into poetry." Most reviews were more favorable. The Atlantic Monthly (February, 1983) wrote: "Mr. Wallace, rambling observantly about the area, has found functioning examples [of evolution] from all the earth's history, which he describes with authority, charm, and a discreet touch of imagination." The Wall Street Journal (2/14/83) wrote: "He is very persuasive and writes beautifully of the contrasting forest levels of these wildly tumbled mountains, from rain forest to snow forest and red rock... in the tradition of the lyrical, literary description naturalists..." The Washington Post (3/13/83) wrote that evolution "frees us, Wallace says, from the older notion that earth and man were created at the caprice of violent gods, and doomed to repeat that violence. Instead, we are part of an open-ended process-- from algae to man, by way of trees and millepedes, and back again."

Wallace has published three other books concerning Klamath/Siskiyou natural history and conservation, as well as many articles. His first book, The Dark Range: A Naturalist's Night Notebook (Sierra Club, 1978) is an exploration of nocturnal wildlife set in the Yolla Bolly/Middle Eel wilderness, the southernmost of the region's national forest wilderness areas. His fifth book, The Turquoise Dragon (Sierra Club, 1985) is an "eco-thriller" set in the region's Trinity Alps and Kalmiopsis wilderness areas, which explores issues like biodiversity and resource exploitation by inventing an endangered species as the focus of a murder mystery. One of his latest books, Articulate Earth (Backcountry Press, 2014) collects a number of articles published about the region during the past four decades in venues like Wilderness magazine, Backpacker, Mother Jones, Greenpeace, and the Sierra Club calendar. From 1998 to 2009, Wallace worked as a writer-consultant on a documentary film about Klamath/Siskiyou natural history and conservation by Stephen Fisher Productions of Los Angeles.
