= Sierra Club Books =

Book publisher

- Parent company: Sierra Club
- Founded: 1960
- Founder: David Brower
- Defunct: May 27, 2015; 11 years ago
- Successor: Counterpoint LLC (Adult books); Gibbs Smith (Children's books)
- Country of origin: United States
- Headquarters location: San Francisco
- Distribution: Publishers Group West
- Publication types: Books
- Nonfiction topics: Environmentalism

Sierra Club Books was the publishing division, for both adults and children, of the Sierra Club, founded in 1960 by then club president David Brower. They were a United States publishing company located in San Francisco, California with a concentration on biological conservation. In 2014 the adult division of the organization was sold to Counterpoint LLC and the children's books division to Gibbs Smith.

== History ==
The Sierra Club started its book program in 1952, when David Brower, an editor with the University of California Press, became the club's executive director. In 1954, they published the first of its climbers’ and hikers’ guides. In 1960, when the Sierra Club Books began, they published the ‘Exhibit Format Book Series’, a collection of nature photography and in 1964 they published their first color volume, Elliot Porter's In Wilderness Is the Preservation of the World.

Volumes intended for club members had been published prior to 1960. In addition, books under their name had been published before 1960, but done through already established publishers, as was the case with This Is Dinosaur, published by Alfred A. Knopf.

Their first in-house book, volume 1 in the Exhibit Format series, was This is the American Earth, published in 1960. In 1962, they introduced color photography to the series with the publication of In Wildness Is the Preservation of the World with photographs by Eliot Porter and Island In Time: The Point Reyes Peninsula with photographs by Philip Hyde. The series won the 1964 Carey–Thomas Award for creative publishing, by Publishers Weekly. Fifty thousand copies were sold in the first four years, and by 1964 sales exceeded 10,000,000 United States dollars. The books were successful in introducing the public to wilderness preservation and to the Sierra Club. Paperback reprints of many of the Exhibit Format books were published by Ballantine Books.

After Brower left the club in 1969, the club came under the leadership of Jon Beckmann from 1979 to 1991. During Beckmann's tenure the program expanded and diversified considerably, publishing books by established and emerging writers such as Wendell Berry, Robert Bly, Galen Rowell, and David Rains Wallace as well as field guides, fiction, poetry, and books on environmental activism, such as the Sierra Club Battlebooks. Many Sierra Club books were produced by the Yolla Bolly Press run by Jim and Carolyn Robertson in Covelo, California. The program continued for two decades after 1994, first under Peter Beren, the former marketing director, then under Helen Sweetland, the former children's books editor. The press closed in 2015 with the adult division of the organization being sold to Counterpoint LLC and the children's books division to Gibbs Smith.

The club continues to publish the Sierra Club Wilderness Calendar and the Sierra Club Engagement Calendar annually, which are perennial bestsellers. They are distributed to the book trade by Publishers Group West.

== Partial bibliography ==
=== Exhibit Format ===
- (1960) This is the American Earth, Ansel Adams and Nancy Newhall
- (1960) Words of the Earth, photographs by Cedric Wright
- (1960) Time and the River Flowing: Grand Canyon, Philip Hyde and Franćois Leydet
- (1962) These We Inherit: The Parklands of America, Ansel Adams
- (1962) In Wildness Is the Preservation of the World, Henry David Thoreau
- (1963) The Place No One Knew: Glen Canyon on the Colorado, Eliot Porter
- (1963) Ansel Adams: A Biography, Volume 1: The Eloquent Light, Nancy Newhall
- (1964) The Last Redwoods: Photographs and Story of a Vanishing Scenic Resource, Philip Hyde and Franćois Leydet
- (1964) Gentle Wilderness: The Sierra Nevada, John Muir and Richard Kauffman
- (1965) Not Man Apart: Photographs of the Big Sur Coast, Robinson Jeffers
- (1965) The Wild Cascades: Forgotten Parkland, Harvey Manning
- (1965) Everest: The West Ridge, Thomas F. Hornbein
- (1966) Summer Island: Penobscot Country, Eliot Porter
- (1966) Glacier Bay: The Land and the Silence, Dave Bohn
- (1969) Navajo Wildlands: As Long as The Rivers Shall Run, Stephen Jett
- (1969) Kauai and the Park Country of Hawaii, Robert Wenkam
- (1967) Baja California and the Geography of Hope, Joseph Wood Krutch
- (1968) Central Park Country: A Tune Within Us, Mireille Johnston
- (1968) Galápagos: The Flow of Wildness - Vol. 1: Discovery, Eliot Porter
- (1968) Galápagos: The Flow of Wildness - Vol. 2: Prospect, Eliot Porter

=== Battlebooks ===
- (1971) Oil on Ice: Alaskan Wilderness at the Crossroads, Tom Brown
- (1971) Mercury: How Much Are We Eating?, Katherine and Peter Montague

=== Yolla Bolly Press ===
- (1984) The Wilder Shore, David Rains Wallace
- (1989) The Yosemite, John Muir

=== Material World ===
- (1994) Material World: A Global Family Portrait, Charles C. Mann
- (1996) Women in the Material World, Faith D'Aluisio

=== Other ===
- (1962) Island in Time: The Point Reyes Peninsula, Philip Hyde (photographer)
- (1967) On the Loose, Terry and Renny Russell
- (1968) The Population Bomb, Paul R. Ehrlich
- (1973) On the Shore of the Sundown Sea, T.H. Watkins
- (1974) Starr's Guide to the John Muir Trail and the High Sierra Region, Walter A. Starr, Jr.
- (1977) The Unsettling of America: Culture and Agriculture, Wendell Berry
- (1977) Nature's Economy: A History of Ecological Ideas, Donald Worster
- (1978) The Dark Range: A Naturalist's Night Notebook, David Rains Wallace
- (1979) Fifty Classic Climbs of North America, Steve Roper and Allen Steck
- (1980) Annapurna: A Woman's Place, Arlene Blum
- (1983) The Klamath Knot: Explorations in Myth and Evolution, David Rains Wallace
- (1983) The River Why, David James Duncan
- (1986) In a Grain of Sand: Exploring Design by Nature, Andreas Feininger
- (1990) Wild by Law: The Sierra Club Legal Defense Fund and the Places It Has Saved, Tom Turner
- (1990) California's Wild Heritage: Threatened and Endangered Animals in the Golden State, Peter Steinhart
- (1991) In the Absence of the Sacred: The Failure of Technology and the Survival of the Indian Nations, Jerry Mander
- (1992) Mother Earth: Through the Eyes of Women Photographers and Writers, Judith Boice, editor
- (1995) Ecopsychology: Restoring the Earth, Healing the Mind, Theodore Roszak, Allen D. Kanner and Mary E. Gomes
- (1997) The Monkey's Bridge: Mysteries of Evolution in Central America, David Rains Wallace
- (1997) Bay Area Wild: A Celebration of the Natural Heritage of the San Francisco Bay Area, Galen Rowell and Michael Sewell
- (2001) The Winemaker's Marsh: Four Seasons in a Restored Wetland, Kenneth Brower
- (2006) Galen Rowell: A Retrospective, Andy Grundberg
- (2009) Gloryland: A Novel, Shelton Johnson
