= Anna Maria Ortese =

Italian author (1914–1998)

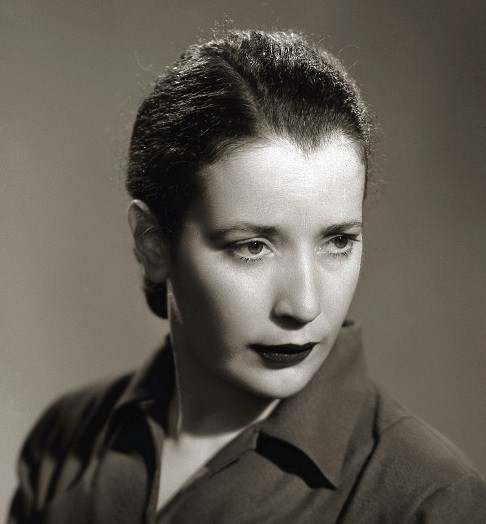
- Ortese in 1953
- Born: June 13, 1914; Rome, Kingdom of Italy
- Died: March 9, 1998 (aged 83); Rapallo, Genoa, Italy
- Occupations: Short story writer; novelist; poet; playwright; journalist
- Writing career
- Pen name: Franca Nicosi
- Language: Italian
- Period: 1933–1998
- Notable works: Il mare non bagna Napoli; L'iguana; Il porto di Toledo

Anna Maria Ortese (Italian pronunciation: [ˈanna maˈriːa orˈteːze, -eːse]; June 13, 1914 – March 9, 1998) was an Italian author of novels, short stories, poetry, and travel writing. Born in Rome, she grew up between southern Italy and Tripoli, with her formal education ending at age thirteen. Her first book, Angelici dolori, was issued in 1937. In 1953 her third collection, Il mare non bagna Napoli, won the coveted Viareggio Prize; thereafter, Ortese's stories, novels, and journalism received many of the most distinguished Italian literary awards, including the Strega and the Fiuggi. Although she lived for many years in Naples following the Second World War, she also resided in Milan, in Rome, and for most of the last twenty years of her life in Rapallo. L'iguana, Ortese’s best-known work in English translation, was published in 1987 as The Iguana by the American literary press McPherson & Company. As of 2023, what she considered as her most important work, the novel Il porto di Toledo (1975), had not been translated into English yet.

== Early life ==
Born in Rome, she was the fifth of six children born to Beatrice "Bice" Vaccà and Oreste Ortese. Her father worked for the Italian government, and the family moved frequently. On 6 January 1933, her brother, Emanuele Carlo, with whom she was very close, died in Martinique, where his ship had docked. The need to process his death drove her to write her first poems.

== Career ==
Her first poems were published in the magazine L'Italia letteraria in 1933. Her work was well-received, and she was encouraged to write further. The following year, the same magazine published her first short story, Pellirossa. In 1937, Massimo Bontempelli, writer for Bompiani and Ortese's mentor, published another of her short stories, Angelici dolori. Although this story received favourable reviews, it drew criticism from prominent literary critics Falqui and Vigorelli.

Despite her promising start, her inspiration and motivation waned. In 1939, she travelled from Florence to Venice, where she found employment as a proofreader with the local newspaper Il Gazzettino. With World War II approaching, Ortese returned to Naples, where she had once lived with her family. It was there that she was once again inspired to write. At the end of the war, Ortese worked as an editor for the magazine Sud.

Her parents died in 1950 and 1953. During this time, she published her second and third books: the collections L'Infanta sepolta and Il mare non bagna Napoli. The latter consisted of short stories and reportages which depicted the abject conditions of Naples following the war; it became highly acclaimed and was awarded the Viareggio Prize. It is from the collection's opening story that the movie Un paio di occhiali was adapted and presented at the Venice Biennale in 2001.

From the mid-1950s to the late 60s, Ortese travelled and wrote extensively. She returned to Milan in 1967 and wrote a novel, Poveri e semplici, for which she was awarded the Strega Prize.

In 1969 she moved to Rome with her sister. Then in 1975, after deep disappointment with the editorial failure of her most important novel, Il porto di Toledo, she left the capital to reach Rapallo. The decade 1975-1985 has been one of the darkest times in her life. In 1983, she began corresponding with Beppe Costa, who encouraged her to publish Il treno russo. In 1986, with the victory of the important Premio Fiuggi, with this book, and the recognition of an annuity by the Italian state, Ortese returns to the centre of attention and begins an important season of her career. The attention that her new publisher, Adelphi, dedicated to the care of her entire literary history contributed to this. In this period she wrote two of her most important novels, Il cardillo addolorato, which topped the Italian fiction list and Alonso e i visionari. Meanwhile, Ortese accepted the proposal to republish many of her earlier novels with foreign publishers. One, L'iguana, was translated into English by McPherson & Company in 1987, and into French by Gallimard in 1988. (An Italian feature film of L'iguana, directed by Catherine McGilvray, was released in 2004.) Another, in 1987, a collection of her short stories, A Music Behind the Wall: Selected Stories, was published. Her latest book was Corpo Celeste, which collects non-fiction and interview writings.

== Death ==
She died of cancer, which she had kept hidden, on March 9, 1998, at the age of 83 in the Rapallo hospital, only a few days after finishing the necessary editing for the re-release of Il porto di Toledo. Only after her death did her work receive international recognition and praise. Her last words, told to Luisa Giuffra, the woman who took care of her in the last days were: "Is the sea far from here? I'd like to see it one last time."

On March 14, Le Monde published an article about her life, writing: "When we were wondering just yesterday who were the 'greats' of Italian literature, one name inevitably came up: Ortese".

== Awards ==
- Viareggio Prize 1953 for Il mare non bagna Napoli
- Strega Prize 1967 for Poveri e semplici
- Fiuggi Prize 1986 for Il treno russo
- Procida-Elsa Morante Prize 1998 for In sonno e in veglia
- Prix du Meilleur Livre Étranger 1998 for the French edition of Il cardillo adolorato (La Douleur du chardonneret)

== Bibliography ==
=== Novels ===
- L'iguana (1965)
  - The Iguana. Translated by Henry Martin (Kingston. McPherson & Company. 1987. ISBN 978-0-9142-3295-7.
- Poveri e semplici (1967)
- Il porto di Toledo (1975)
- Il cappello piumato (1979)
- Il cardillo addolorato (1993)
  - The Lament of the Linnet. Translated by Patrick Creagh. 1997.
- Alonso e i visionari (1996)

=== Short stories ===
- Angelici dolori (1937)
- L'Infanta sepolta (1950)
- Il mare non bagna Napoli (1953)
  - The Bay is Not Naples. Translated by Frances Frenaye. 1955.
  - Evening Descends Upon the Hills. Translated by Ann Goldstein; Jenny McPhee. London: Pushkin Press. 2018. ISBN 9781782273356.
  - Neapolitan Chronicles. Translated by Ann Goldstein; Jenny McPhee. New York: New Vessel Press. 2018. ISBN 978-1-939931-51-1.
- I giorni del cielo (1958)
- Silenzio a Milano (1958)
- La luna sul muro e altri racconti (1968)
- L'alone grigio (1969)
- Estivi terrori (1987)
- La morte del Folletto (1987)
- In sonno e in veglia (1987)
- Il monaciello di Napoli – Il fantasma (2002) – stories originally published between 1940 and 1942
- Mistero doloroso (2010) – previously unpublished stories

Two volumes of her selected short stories, translated by Henry Martin and published under the collective title A Music Behind the Wall, appeared in 1994 and 1998 from McPherson & Company.

=== Poems ===
- La carrozza di Jane. Lugano: Arti Tipografiche Induno. 1988.
- Il mio paese è la notte. Roma: Empirìa. 1996. ISBN 9788885303355.
- La luna che trascorre. Ed. by Giacinto Spagnoletti. Roma: Empirìa. 1998. ISBN 9788885303584.

=== Essays and travel writing ===
- Il treno russo (1983) – reportage
- Il mormorio di Parigi (1986) – articles published around 1961
- La lente scura. Scritti di viaggio (1991) – travel writings
- Le giacchette grigie della Nunziatella – articles from 1945-1947
- Corpo celeste (1997) – writings from 1974 to 1989
- Da Moby Dick all'Orsa Bianca (2011) – writings on literature and art, published between 1939 and 1994
- Le piccole persone (2016) – in defence of animals and other writings, some previously unpublished

== Sources ==
- Reed, Cosetta S. "Biography: Ortese, Anna Maria," N.p., 2004.
- "Anna Maria Ortese", The Times Literary Supplement, 29 January 1970.
