= Martha McPhee =

American novelist (born 1965)

- Born: 1965 (age 60–61)
- Education: Bowdoin College; Columbia University (MFA)
- Occupation: Novelist
- Children: 2
- Parent(s): John McPhee; Pryde Brown
- Website: marthamcphee.com

Martha McPhee (born 1965) is an American novelist whose work focuses on social and financial mobility in the United States.

Her second novel, Gorgeous Lies, was a 2002 National Book Award finalist. She has received a National Endowment for the Arts grant and a John Simon Guggenheim Foundation fellowship. She teaches English at Hofstra University. Her work has been translated into languages including Dutch, German, Arabic, Italian.

== Career ==
Martha McPhee received a National Endowment for the Arts grant to complete her first novel, Bright Angel Time, which was published in 1997. It was a New York Times Notable Book.

Her second novel, Gorgeous Lies, a follow-up to Bright Angel Time, was a finalist for the 2002 National Book Award. In 2003, McPhee won a Guggenheim Fellowship for fiction.

Her third novel, L'America, was published in 2006. Her fourth novel, Dear Money, set during the 2008-209 financial crisis, was published in 2010, and her fifth novel, An Elegant Woman, was published in 2020. Her work has appeared in several literary journals, including The New Yorker, Harper's Bazaar, Tin House, and The American Scholar. Her memoir, Omega Farm, was published in 2023.

== Personal life ==
McPhee is the daughter of literary journalist John McPhee and his first wife, photographer Pryde Brown. She has three sisters also born to her parents: fellow novelist Jenny, photographer Laura, and architectural historian Sarah.

After her parents divorced and her mother remarried, McPhee lived with her mother, stepfather Dan Sullivan, three sisters, and five stepsisters on a farm outside of Princeton, New Jersey. Her mother and stepfather also had a daughter together, her half-sister Joan Sullivan.

McPhee graduated from Bowdoin College in Brunswick, Maine in 1987. Several years later, she went to graduate school and received her M.F.A. from Columbia University in 1997. She lives in New York City, and teaches at Hofstra University. She married Mark Svenvold, a poet, and they had two children together, Livia and Jasper Svenvold McPhee.

In 2020 she and her family returned to the farm where she had grown up, as her mother needed increasing help due to dementia.

== Published works ==
- Bright Angel Time (1997)
- Girls: Ordinary Girls and Their Extraordinary Pursuits (2000) (coauthored with her sister Jenny McPhee, with photographs by sister Laura McPhee)
- Gorgeous Lies (2002)
- L'America (2006)
- Dear Money (2010)
- An Elegant Woman (2020)
- Omega Farm (memoir, 2023)
