= The Pine Barrens =

1968 book by John McPhee

- Author: John McPhee
- Subject: Pine Barrens (New Jersey)
- Publication date: 1968
- ISBN: 978-0374233600

The Pine Barrens is a 1968 book by American writer John McPhee about the history, people and biology of the New Jersey Pine Barrens that originally appeared in The New Yorker in 1967.

The book is an early example of McPhee's acclaimed creative nonfiction literary style. The book employs a nonlinear narrative that incorporates profiles of contemporary residents, local history and culture, unique geography and environment, and current issues then facing the region.

== Synopsis ==
The Pine Barrens is divided into nine chapters, or installments.

- In "The Woods From Hog Wallow," McPhee introduces the Pine Barrens as the six hundred and fifty thousand acre virgin forest reserve that dominates the southern half of New Jersey. The Pine Barrens region is sparsely populated at about 15 people/square mile, in contrast to New Jersey's average population density elsewhere of 1,000 people/square mile (the greatest in the US). Local residents, who inhabit mostly small forest towns amid vast stretches of wilderness, refer to the area as "pine belt" "the pinelands," or "the pines."

In speaking to these locals - or "Pineys," a term which has contested connotations - McPhee claims that his interest in the untouched region stems from its proximity to major urban centers (i.e. Philadelphia and New York). Burlington and Ocean County developed plans to construct a supersonic jet port, but these plans have never been executed - and most people (including "Pineys") believe that they never will be.

The Pines Barrens host an underground reservoir of pure, untapped water. Loose, high-absorption soil makes the woods an ideal aquifer, while self-contained rivers prevent pollution from foreign water sources. Nevertheless, the aquifer's water table is notably shallow and therefore extremely easy to contaminate.

McPhee meets Frederick Chambers Brown, a resident of Hog Wallow in the Pines and a widower with 7 children. Brown has no telephone and shows McPhee around the area throughout the series. Along with Brown, McPhee encounters Bill Wasovwich, a young man who grew up in the Pines. Wasovwich's familiarity with the complex trail system of the woodlands allows him to embark on long journeys that non-locals could never experience.

- In "Vanished Towns," McPhee explores the history of the Pines. The woods functioned as refuge for various dissociated social groups, such as the Tories during the American revolution and Quakers. Iron was a productive industry in the Pines for years during the nineteenth century, yet all that presently remains of the ironwork (which relocated, along with other heavy metal industries, to Pittsburgh) are small iron towns in the Pines, such as Batsto.
- In "The Separate World," McPhee describes the development of the Pines' reputation as a region of alleged savagery. Through the late nineteenth and early twentieth century, numerous magazine articles and reports (notably Elizabeth Kate's "The Piney," which depicted residents as drunk, illiterate, and incestuous half-animals) stigmatized the region's population as backward, nearly primitive, recluses. Although images of hostile back-landers eventually disappeared from media representations, the term "piney" still possesses multiple connotations. Whereas some tourists still come to the region seeking strange, eccentric foresters that they refer to as "Pineys," locals also utilize the term to endearingly refer to their neighbors. Hence, most residents of the Pine Barrens, while recognizing the term's contested meanings, claim the term "Piney" as a respectful recognition of a long-term, like-minded local.

McPhee describes the yearly cycle of natural yields in the Pines: in the spring, sphagnum moss; in the summer, blueberries, then cranberries; in the fall, berries off of vines; and in the winter, cordwood and charcoal. "Pineys" gather and sell these and other natural materials, allowing for self-sustainability without a longstanding nine-to-five job. This naturalistic sentiment is indicative of the cultural character of the Pines.

- In "The Air Tune," McPhee describes the popular storytelling practices in the Pines. Herbert N. Halpert collected Pine Barrens story in the 1930s and 40s, describing the legends as mostly European but featuring an overlapping of various regional traditions. Most famously, the Jersey Devil, or Leed's Devil, describes a half-bat, half-kangaroo that killed its human mother at age 4 and has been wandering around the Pine Barrens ever since; as with most Pine Barrens folk tales, there are numerous versions of the story.
- In "The Capital of the Pines," McPhee describes Chatsworth, the principal community of the Pines, where roughly two-thirds of the residents 'live off the land' or work various odd jobs, such as highway workers or fire wardens. There is very little crime in the Pine Barrens, and police hardly bother with the region's residents, who are mostly loners and largely keep to themselves. Typically, crime is the work of outsiders, and the back roads of the region are notoriously difficult to navigate.
- In "The Turn of Events," McPhee details three noteworthy happenings in the Pines. First, the Chatsworth Fire of 1954 burned five hundred acres of land. Second, Emilio Carranza, a famous Mexican aviator, crashed in the Pines in 1928 while flying from New York to Mexico City; a yearly memorial is held in his memory at the site of the crash. Third, Italian prince Mario Ruspoli, 2nd Prince of Poggio Suasa built an estate in Chatsworth on land belonging to his wife, legacy of a substantial New York City real estate fortune.
- In "Fire in the Pines," McPhee explains the role of fires in the Pines. Nearly four hundred forest fires occur in the Pines every year; the pine trees require this fire in order to flourish. A sort of "natural selection" enables only two types of Pines, which put forth sprouts in response to fire, to grow in the area. The fires prevent the march of natural progression, so to speak, which would replace the pines with other trees, such as oaks or maples. The woods therefore remain perpetually "young" due to this "biological inertia."

The region also attracts pyromaniacs: it seems that many people (including, on one occasion, a police officer of the Pines) cannot resist the urge to set the severely dry area ablaze. The Upper Plains of the Pines, which possess dwarf trees, whose incongruously small height remains a mystery to scientists, some of whom posit that the fires kill the trees' taproots but not their lateral ones, thus giving them a dwarf size.

- In "The Fox Handles the Day," McPhee discusses the environmental aspects and hunting practices of the area. Quaking bogs are virtually unique to the Pine Barrens, and the area's plant species resemble (though are not identical to) those of North Carolina's pinelands. Fox hunting is popular in the pines; hunters have their dogs chase down foxes, where after they release the foxes back into the forest. Deer hunting is also prevalent, as NJ hosts a high deer population.
- In "Vision," McPhee examines plans to develop the Pines. During the mid-nineteenth century, real estate speculators worked to develop the area, selling Pines land in major cities throughout the east coast. The most elaborate plan for the area was a supersonic jetport (the largest on Earth) and a new city, researched by the federal government and criticized by conservationists. Due to the spectrum of varied opinions about the project, McPhee predicts the Pines will not be dramatically changed any time soon.
