= Laura McPhee =

American photographer (born 1958)

- Born: June 8, 1958 (age 68); New York, New York, US
- Known for: Photography
- Awards: Guggenheim Fellowship, Fulbright Scholars Fellowship, New England Foundation for the Arts Fellowship
- Website: lauramcphee.com

Laura McPhee (born 1958) is an American photographer known for making detailed large-format photographs of the cultural landscape. Her images raise questions about human effects on the environment and the nature of humankind's complex and contested relationship to the earth.

== Early life and education ==
Laura McPhee grew up in central New Jersey, the oldest daughter of Pulitzer Prize-winning author John McPhee and photographer Pryde Brown. She had three younger sisters, novelists Jenny McPhee and Martha McPhee; and architectural historian, Sarah McPhee.

After her parents divorced, her mother married Dan Sullivan, a therapist. They had a daughter Joan together. She is CEO of the Partnership for LA Schools.

The new blended family included five step-siblings from her stepfather's first marriage. Together they lived on a 50-acre farm in New Jersey.

McPhee earned a Bachelor of Arts in Art History from Princeton University in 1980, and a Master of Fine Arts in Photography from the Rhode Island School of Design in 1986.

== Career ==
She is a professor at the Massachusetts College of Art and Design.

Some of her achievements include a Fulbright Scholars Fellowship to work in India and Sri Lanka, a residency in the Sawtooth Valley of central Idaho from the Alturas Foundation, a New England Foundation for the Arts Fellowship, and a John Simon Guggenheim Memorial Foundation Fellowship. Her work is in the collections of the Metropolitan Museum of Art, the Los Angeles County Museum of Art and the Getty Center, the Boston Museum of Fine Arts, the San Francisco Museum of Modern Art, and the Whitney Museum of American Art, among many others.

== Work ==
McPhee is noted for her large-scale photographs of landscapes and portraits of people who live and work in them. McPhee's work is concerned with place and the ways we define and manage our relationship to the land. McPhee's work has been exhibited both in the United States and abroad.

Her body of work River of No Return was exhibited at the Boston Museum of Fine Arts in 2006 and at Kansas City's Kemper Museum of Contemporary Art in 2013. A monograph of the same title was published by Yale University Press in 2008. Her first monograph, No Ordinary Land (in collaboration with Virginia Beahan) was published by Aperture in 1998.

McPhee's most recent book, The Home and the World: A View of Calcutta (2014), explores the weight of colonialism through images of the architecture of that city and portraits of passersby. It was published by Yale University Press. Alan Thomas wrote about this work in Places Journal.

== Exhibitions ==
- 1994 – Photographer's Gallery, London, England
- 1995 – pARTs Gallery, Minneapolis, MN
- 1995 – Rose Art Museum, Brandeis University, Waltham, MA
- 1998 – Laurence Miller Gallery, New York, NY
- 1999 – No Ordinary Land, Burden Gallery, Aperture, New York, NY
- 1999 – No Ordinary Land, Massachusetts College of Art, Boston, MA
- 1999 – No Ordinary Land, Carnegie Museum of Art, Pittsburgh, PA
- 2001 – No Ordinary Land, Columbus Art Museum, Columbus, OH
- 2001 – No Ordinary Land, Teton Regional, Jackson, Wyoming
- 2001 – No Ordinary Land, Cornell University Art Museum, Ithaca, New York
- 2002 – No Ordinary Land, Vision Gallery, Jerusalem, Israel
- 2002 – Interior Calcutta, II Gabbiano Gallery, Rome, Italy
- 2004 – The Home and the World, Bernard Toale Gallery, Boston, MA
- 2005 – No Ordinary Land, Sam Noble Museum, Norman, OK
- 2005 – Kolkata, Bonni Benrubi Gallery, New York, NY
- 2006 – Silent Steps, Bernard Toale Gallery, Boston, MA
- 2006 – River of No Return - Museum of Fine Arts Boston
- 2007 – River of No Return, Boise Art Museum, Boise, ID, 2007 (solo) Gail Severn Gallery, Ketchum, Idaho
- 2008 – Two Canyons, Two Years Later, Bernard Toale Gallery, Boston, MA
- 2008 – River of No Return, Gail Gibson Gallery, Seattle WA
- 2009 – Guardians of Solitude, Bonni Benrubi Gallery, New York, NY
- 2009 – Guardians of Solitude, Gail Severn Gallery, Ketchum, ID
- 2011 – River of No Return, Navarro Gallery, Southwest School of Art, San Antonio TX 2011 White Clouds, Gail Severn Gallery, Ketchum, ID
- 2011 – When We Talk About Love, Carroll & Sons, Boston, MA
- 2012 – Push - G. Gibson Gallery, Seattle, WA
- 2012 – Looking Back at Earth: Contemporary Environmental Photography from the Hood Museum of Art's Collection, Dartmouth College, Hanover, NH
- 2012 – A Generous Medium: Photography at Wellesley College, 1972-2012, Davis Museum, Wellesley, MA, 2012
- 2012 – America In View: Photography from 1865 to Now, Rhode Island School of Design Museum, Providence, RI
- 2013 – River of No Return - Kemper Museum of Contemporary Art, Kansas City, MO
- 2015 – The Home and the World: a View of Calcutta, Gail Severn Gallery, Ketchum, ID
- 2015 – The Home and the World: a View of Calcutta, Carroll and Sons Gallery, Boston, MA
- 2015 – The Home and the World: a View of Calcutta, Benrubi Gallery, New York, NY
- 2016 – Selections, Bakalar & Paine Galleries, Massachusetts College of Art, Boston, MA
- 2016 – Big: Photographs from the Collection, The Cleveland Museum of Art, Cleveland, OH
- 2016 – Changing Frontiers, The Chrysler Museum of Art, Norfolk, VA
- 2017 – Samuel F.B. Morse's Gallery of the Louvre and the Art of Invention, The Peabody Essex Museum, Salem, MA
- 2018 – Ansel Adams in Our Time, The Boston Museum of Fine Arts, Boston, MA
- 2019 – Women Take the Floor, The Boston Museum of Fine Arts, Boston, MA
- 2020 – Mirage: Energy, Water and Creativity in the Great Basin, Boise Art Museum, Boise, ID
- 2020 – Loosely Stated, ROSEGALLERY, Santa Monica, CA
- 2021 – What We Do in The Shadows, deCordova Sculpture Park and Museum, Lincoln, MA
- 2021 – Ansel Adams in Our Time, Portland Art Museum, Portland, OR
- 2021 – The Expanded Landscape, The Getty, Los Angeles, CA

== Publications ==
=== Publications authored by Laura McPhee ===
- 1998 - No Ordinary Land, Laura McPhee and Virginia Beahan, Aperture ISBN 0893817333
- 2000 - Girls: Ordinary Girls and Their Extraordinary Pursuits, Laura McPhee, Jenny McPhee and Martha McPhee, Random House ISBN 0375501673
- 2008 - River of No Return, Laura McPhee, Yale University Press ISBN 9780300141009
- 2009 - Guardians of Solitude, Laura McPhee, ISBN 0956146104
- 2011 - Gateway: Visions for an Urban National Park, ISBN 1568989555
- 2014 - The Home and the World: A View of Calcutta, Laura McPhee, Yale University Press
- 2018 - Lost, Laura McPhee, Kris Graves Projects. OCLC 1035555819

=== Publications including photographs by Laura McPhee ===
- 1996 - Flesh and Blood: Photographers’ Images ISBN 0948797223
- 2018 - Eye on the West: Photography and the Contemporary West, George Miles, Yale University Press, ISBN 9780300232851
- 2018 - The Photographer in the Garden, Sarah Anne McNear, Jamie M. Allen, Aperture, ISBN 9781597113731

== Grants and awards ==
- 1980 – Page Award for Exceptional Achievement in the Visual Arts, Princeton University
- 1984 – New Jersey Council for the Arts Grant
- 1991, 1990, 1988 – Polaroid Artists Support Grant, Polaroid Corporation
- 1993 – John Simon Guggenheim Memorial Foundation Fellowship
- 1995 – New England Foundation for the Arts Fellowship
- 1998 – Fulbright Scholars' Fellowship to India and Sri Lanka
- 2003–2004 – Alturas Foundation (Commission)
- 2006 – Peter Reed Foundation Grant
- 2007 – Camargo Foundation (Residency), Cassis, France
- 2008–2009 — Van Alen Institute (Commission), New York
- 2004, 2009 – Massachusetts College of Art and Design Faculty Fellowship
