= Pryde Brown =

American photographer (1935–2024)

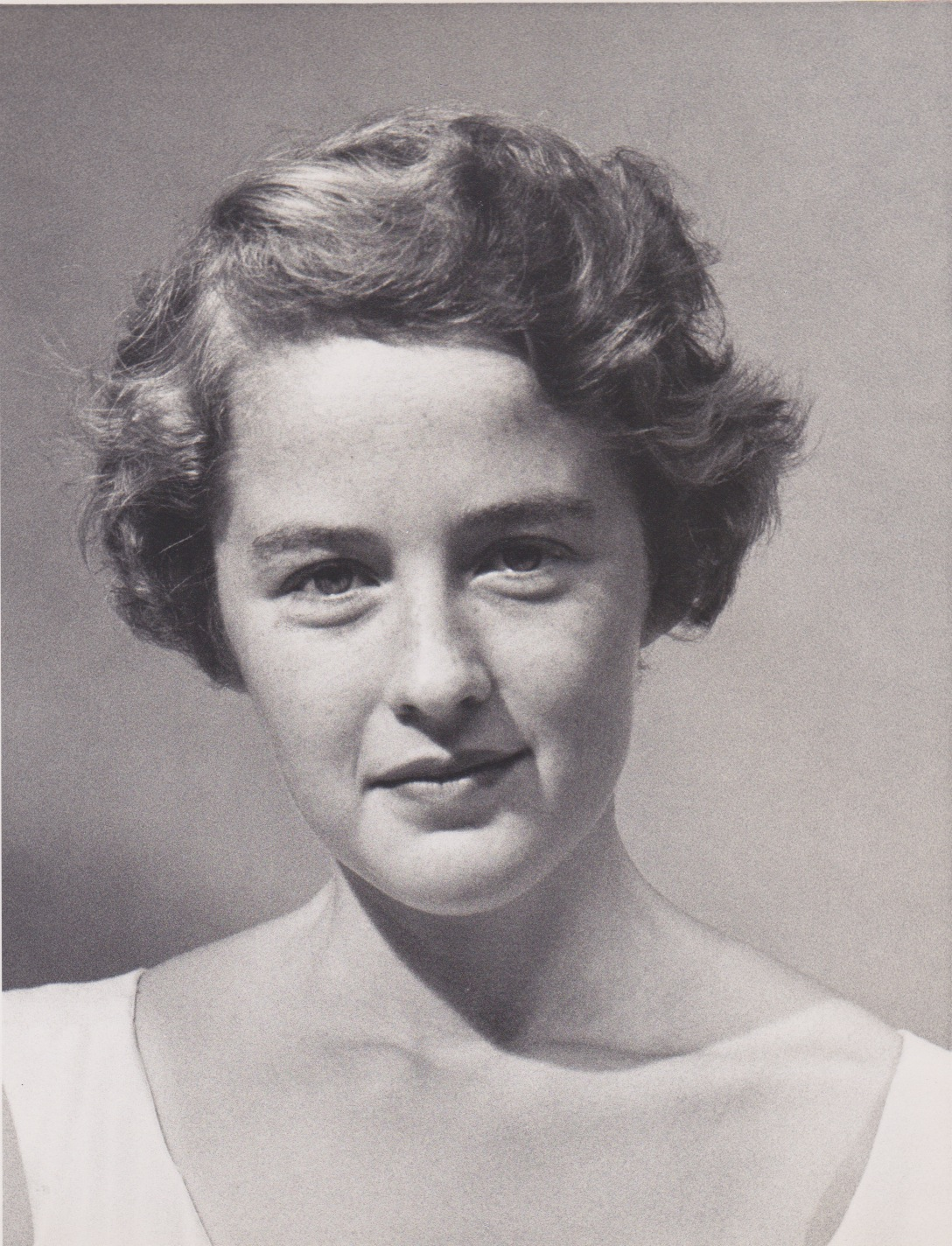
- Born: Pryde Breed Brown; January 27, 1935
- Died: September 29, 2024 (aged 89)
- Education: Sweet Briar College
- Occupation: Photographer
- Children: 5 (including Jenny McPhee, Martha McPhee, and Laura McPhee)

Pryde Breed Brown (January 27, 1935 – September 29, 2024) was an American photographer and feminist best known for her portrait and wedding photography. She opened her photography studio in Princeton, New Jersey, in 1970, and was an active member of the National Organization for Women and Women on Words and Images.

== Background ==
Brown graduated from Sweet Briar College in June 1956. She married creative nonfiction writer John McPhee less than a year after graduating, on March 16, 1957. The couple had four children: photographer Laura McPhee, writers Jenny McPhee and Martha McPhee, and architectural historian Sarah McPhee. During her marriage to McPhee, Brown was a traditional stay-at-home mother and wife, despite harboring a desire to be a writer.

Brown and McPhee separated in 1969 and were divorced in 1972, when Brown was 37. She subsequently married Texan psychologist Dan Sullivan. They had a fifth daughter, Joan Sullivan, together.

They acquired 50 acres of rural property in West Amwell, New Jersey. It had a house, two cottages and a 1920s hunting cabin, all of which required work. The property was named Pryde's Point, and is adjacent to what is known as the Alexauken Creek Wildlife Management Area, acquired by the state in the early 21st century. In 2002 the Brown/Sullivan property was preserved by D&R Greenway Land Trust.

The family lived there with their large "blended family," which included Brown's four daughters from her first marriage, Sullivan's five children from his first marriage, and their youngest daughter Joan. They also had a range of pets and animals, including a donkey and chickens.

While married to Sullivan, Brown became the primary breadwinner with her photography. In 2017, Brown developed signs of dementia.

Brown died on September 29, 2024, at the age of 89.

== Career ==
Brown had dreams of being a career woman from a young age, although her exact ambition frequently shifted. While in college and when married to McPhee, she wanted to be a writer, and also considered becoming a historian of China. She worked on a novel and received a grant from the New Jersey State Council on the Arts to support the project, although she never finished it.

In 1970 Brown began her long-term career in photography. She had been introduced to photography as a young girl when her father gave her a 35 millimeter Bolsa camera.

When Brown's friend Ulli Steltzer announced she was leaving her Princeton photo studio, Brown and Elaine Miller Pilshaw took over the studio. In her first years of photography work, Brown took classes, learned from Steltzer, and learned by doing. She specialized in wedding and portrait photography. Brown was said to be very good with people; she said that "the key to capturing great photos was not being noticed.”

She became a specialist in archival processing, specifically black and white prints. She had learned about the technique from her daughter Laura, who had studied it in Emmet Gowin's laboratory. Archival photographs are taken with a medium-format film camera. Negatives are developed in the darkroom and printed on gelatin silver paper.

Brown preferred black and white over color photography, stating that "color prints don't last and will always fade." She continued her father's tradition by giving her daughter Laura McPhee her first camera and watched her develop into a well-known professional photographer. Brown often took on interns as part of her studio.

== Feminism and advocacy work ==
Following her separation from McPhee, Brown became an active member of the Central New Jersey Chapter of the National Organization for Women. Several of the Chapter's women, including Joan Bartl, Rogie Stone Bender, Cynthia Eaton, Carol Portnoi Jacobs and Ann Stefan, formed a group called Women on Words and Images, and they studied books by major publishers. The group found that statistically both children's and adult books portrayed boys more often than girls. In these same children's books, boys were more often depicted as creative, whereas girls were shown taking part in domestic chores.

In 1972, the group published its findings in the influential book, Dick and Jane as Victims, which was revised and republished in 1975. Brown and the group also co-published Channeling Children: Sex Stereotyping on Prime Time TV in 1975.
