= Fairfield Porter =

American painter and art critic (1907–1975)

- Porter's painting "Under the Elms," 1971-72.
- Born: June 10, 1907; Winnetka, Illinois, U.S.
- Died: September 18, 1975 (aged 68); Southampton, New York, U.S.
- Education: Harvard University, Art Students' League
- Known for: Painting, art criticism
- Movement: New York Figurative Expressionism

Fairfield Porter (June 10, 1907 – September 18, 1975) was an American painter and art critic. He was the fourth of five children of James Porter, an architect, and Ruth Furness Porter, a poet from a literary family. He was the brother of photographer Eliot Porter and the brother-in-law of federal Reclamation Commissioner Michael W. Straus. He was married to the poet Anne Porter (1911–2011).

While a student at Harvard, Porter majored in fine arts; he continued his studies at the Art Students' League when he moved to New York City in 1928. His studies at the Art Students' League predisposed him to produce socially relevant art and, although the subjects would change, he continued to produce realist work for the rest of his career. He would be criticized and revered for continuing his representational style in the midst of the Abstract Expressionist movement.

His subjects were primarily landscapes, domestic interiors and portraits of family, friends and fellow artists, many of them affiliated with the New York School of writers, including John Ashbery, Frank O'Hara, and James Schuyler. Many of his paintings were set in or around the family summer house on Great Spruce Head Island, Maine and the family home at 49 South Main Street, Southampton, New York.

His painterly vision, which encompassed a fascination with nature and the ability to reveal extraordinariness in ordinary life, was heavily indebted to the French painters Pierre Bonnard and Édouard Vuillard. John Ashbery wrote of him: "Characteristically, [Porter] tended to prefer the late woolly Vuillards to the early ones everyone likes".

Porter said once, "When I paint, I think that what would satisfy me is to express what Bonnard said Renoir told him: 'make everything more beautiful.'"

== Work in public collections ==
Porter bequeathed about 250 of his works to the Parrish Art Museum.

- Laurence at the Piano (1953), New Britain Museum of American Art.
- Katie and Anne (1955), Hirshhorn Museum and Sculpture Garden
- Still Life with Casserole (1955), Smithsonian American Art Museum
- Elaine de Kooning (1957), Metropolitan Museum of Art
- Frank O' Hara (1957), Toledo Museum of Art
- Maine Coast (1958), Metropolitan Museum of Art
- Chrysanthemums (1958), Wadsworth Atheneum
- Schwenk, (1959), Museum of Modern Art
- Children in a Field (1960), Whitney Museum of American Art
- Boathouses (1961), Hirshhorn Museum and Sculpture Garden
- The Garden Road (1962), Whitney Museum of American Art
- Jerry at the Piano (1962), Hirshhorn Museum and Sculpture Garden
- Jimmy and Liz (1963), Pennsylvania Academy of the Fine Arts
- October Interior (1963), Crystal Bridges Museum of American Art
- The Screen Porch (1964), Whitney Museum of American Art
- Flowers by the Sea (1965), Museum of Modern Art
- Interior in Sunlight (1965), Brooklyn Museum
- The Mirror (1966), Nelson-Atkins Museum of Art
- Anne in a Striped Dress (1967), Parrish Art Museum
- John MacWhinnie (1968), Parrish Art Museum
- Under the Elms (1971), Pennsylvania Academy of the Fine Arts
- Sunrise on South Main Street (1973), Metropolitan Museum of Art
- Inez MacWhinnie (1974), Parrish Art Museum
- The Dock (1974–75), Farnsworth Art Museum
- Apple Blossoms I (1974), The Christmas Tree (1971), Street Scene (1969), Muscarelle Museum of Art
- Near Union Square--Looking up Park Avenue (1975), Metropolitan Museum of Art
