= Annals of the Former World =

Book by John McPhee

- Cover for Annals of the Former World
- Author: John McPhee
- Subject: Geology
- Publisher: Farrar, Straus and Giroux
- Publication date: 1998
- Pages: 696
- ISBN: 978-0-374-10520-4
- Dewey Decimal: 557.3 21
- LC Class: QE77 .M38 1998

Annals of the Former World is a book on geology written by John McPhee and published in 1998 by Farrar, Straus and Giroux. It won the 1999 Pulitzer Prize for General Nonfiction.

The book presents a geological history of North America, and was researched and written over the course of two decades beginning in 1978. It consists of a compilation of five books, the first four of which were previously published as Basin and Range (1981), In Suspect Terrain (1983), Rising from the Plains (1986), and Assembling California (1993), plus a final book, Crossing the Craton. A narrative table of contents provides an overview of the project, which largely consisted of a series of road journeys by McPhee across the North American continent in the company of noted geologists.

In 2023, the composers and artists John P. Hastings and Benjamin Mayock completed a visual and audio translation of the book entitled The Former World.
