= Michael W. Straus =

Michael Wolf Straus (1897–1970) was the Commissioner of the United States Bureau of Reclamation from 1945 until 1953.

== Biography ==
Straus was born in Chicago in 1897. He pursued a career as a newspaperman, serving as managing editor of the Chicago Evening Post and rising to the position of Washington, D.C. bureau chief of the International News Service. In 1933, Harold L. Ickes, the newly appointed Secretary of the United States Department of the Interior, selected Straus as a personal aide and handler of the Cabinet secretary's press relations.

Straus served at Ickes's side during his chief's tenure at the Interior Department, rising to the position of First Assistant Secretary of the Department in March 1943. In 1946, soon after the death of President Franklin D. Roosevelt, Ickes resigned from the Cabinet. Straus continued as part of the new Truman Administration, moving laterally in December 1945 to the position of Commissioner of the Bureau of Reclamation within the Interior Department.

Straus's tenure at Reclamation during the late 1940s coincided with one of the Bureau's most intensive period of concrete dam-building, with numerous structures built in the Columbia River, the Colorado River drainage, and other major watersheds across the American West. Straus presided over the construction and dedication of dams such as Hungry Horse Dam in Montana. He left his position in 1953 soon after the inauguration of President Dwight D. Eisenhower.

== Criticism ==
The Bureau of Reclamation has been severely criticized for the permanent alterations it made to natural waterflows throughout the western United States. Works like One Flew Over the Cuckoo's Nest, by novelist Ken Kesey, lament what they see as the destruction caused by the dams and reservoirs constructed by the Bureau of Reclamation and its sister agency, the Army Corps of Engineers, during this period. On the other hand, the electrical power generated by the new federal dams constructed during this period has become an essential element in the lives of millions of people in Idaho, Oregon, Washington, and neighboring states.

== Later life ==
Michael W. Straus lived in retirement with his wife Nancy Porter Straus in Washington, D.C., until dying on August 9, 1970. Through Nancy he was a brother-in-law of photographer Eliot Porter and painter Fairfield Porter.
