= A Sense of Where You Are =

1965 book by John McPhee

- First edition
- Author: John McPhee
- Language: English
- Publisher: Farrar, Straus and Giroux
- Publication date: 1965
- Publication place: United States
- Media type: Print (Hardback & Paperback)

A Sense of Where You Are, by John McPhee, profiles Bill Bradley during Bradley's senior year at Princeton University. Bradley, who would later play in the National Basketball Association and serve in the United States Senate, was widely regarded as one of the best basketball players in the country, and his status as a Rhodes Scholar playing in the Ivy League only added to his allure. Published in 1965, this book describes Bradley's rise to stardom at Princeton, then follows Bradley through the final year of his college career, culminating in Princeton's third-place finish in that year's NCAA Tournament.

Late in Bradley's career at Princeton—in the summer before Bradley's senior year—McPhee profiled Bradley for The New Yorker magazine. Although Bradley had been a prominent basketball player for his first three years at Princeton, his performance with the gold-medal-winning U.S. men's basketball team at the 1964 Olympic Games in Tokyo vaulted him to national celebrity. McPhee describes all aspects of Bradley's game, from his roots playing basketball in Crystal City, Missouri and his Olympic experience to Bradley's particular passing and shooting techniques, various physical gifts (including an extraordinary range of vision), and intense discipline and commitment. He also discusses Bradley's studies and extracurricular activities at Princeton, where he concentrated in History and led Sunday-school classes through the Fellowship of Christian Athletes.

Over the course of his senior year, Bradley added to his impressive academic and basketball records. He led Princeton to the Ivy League Championship, the Eastern Regional Championship of the NCAA tournament, and a third-place finish at the NCAA National Championships, where Princeton set records for most points scored and most field goals made. Individually, Bradley became the third-leading scorer in NCAA history, broke every significant Ivy League basketball record, set several new marks for scoring in the NCAA Championship, and was named most valuable player of the national championships as well as the national player of the year. He was also awarded a Rhodes scholarship and graduated with honors from Princeton that spring.

Van Breda Kolff, Bradley's coach at Princeton, as well as several of Bradley's teammates, also receive mention in this book. McPhee describes van Breda Kolff as an "Abstract Expressionist" of basketball—a coach who values the nuances of the game and "appears to feel that mere winning is far less important than winning with style." McPhee also highlights the play of Gary Walters (who went on to an accomplished coaching career and eventually becoming athletic director for Princeton, where he retired in 2014), Don Rodenbach, Bob Haarlow, Robbie Brown, Ed Hummer, and even Ken Shank, a role player and defensive specialist whose task was to guard Bradley in practice. Although the 1965 Princeton basketball team was first and foremost Bradley's team, McPhee writes, each of these men had an important role to play in that team's unprecedented success.

Even today, the feats McPhee describes in this book stand as some of the most impressive achievements in NCAA basketball history. Although the NCAA tournament expanded to 6 games in 1985, Bradley's 177 points in 5 games is still the second-most by any player in an NCAA championship (behind Glen Rice's 184), and his average of 35.4 points per game is fifth all-time. Princeton's third-place finish in 1965 is the best-ever result by an Ivy League school in the NCAA tournament, and Bradley still holds Ivy League records in nearly ever major statistical category.

Until this book was published, neither John McPhee nor Bill Bradley were well-known on a national level. However, after publication each would go on to a prominent career in writing and basketball, respectively. McPhee went on to win the Pulitzer Prize in non-fiction writing, and became a professor of nonfiction writing at Princeton. Bradley, meanwhile, played for 10 years in the NBA with the New York Knicks, winning two league championships, then became a three-term United States Senator from New Jersey and Democratic presidential candidate in 2000. Each remains a fan of Princeton basketball.
