= John McPhee =

American author (born 1931)

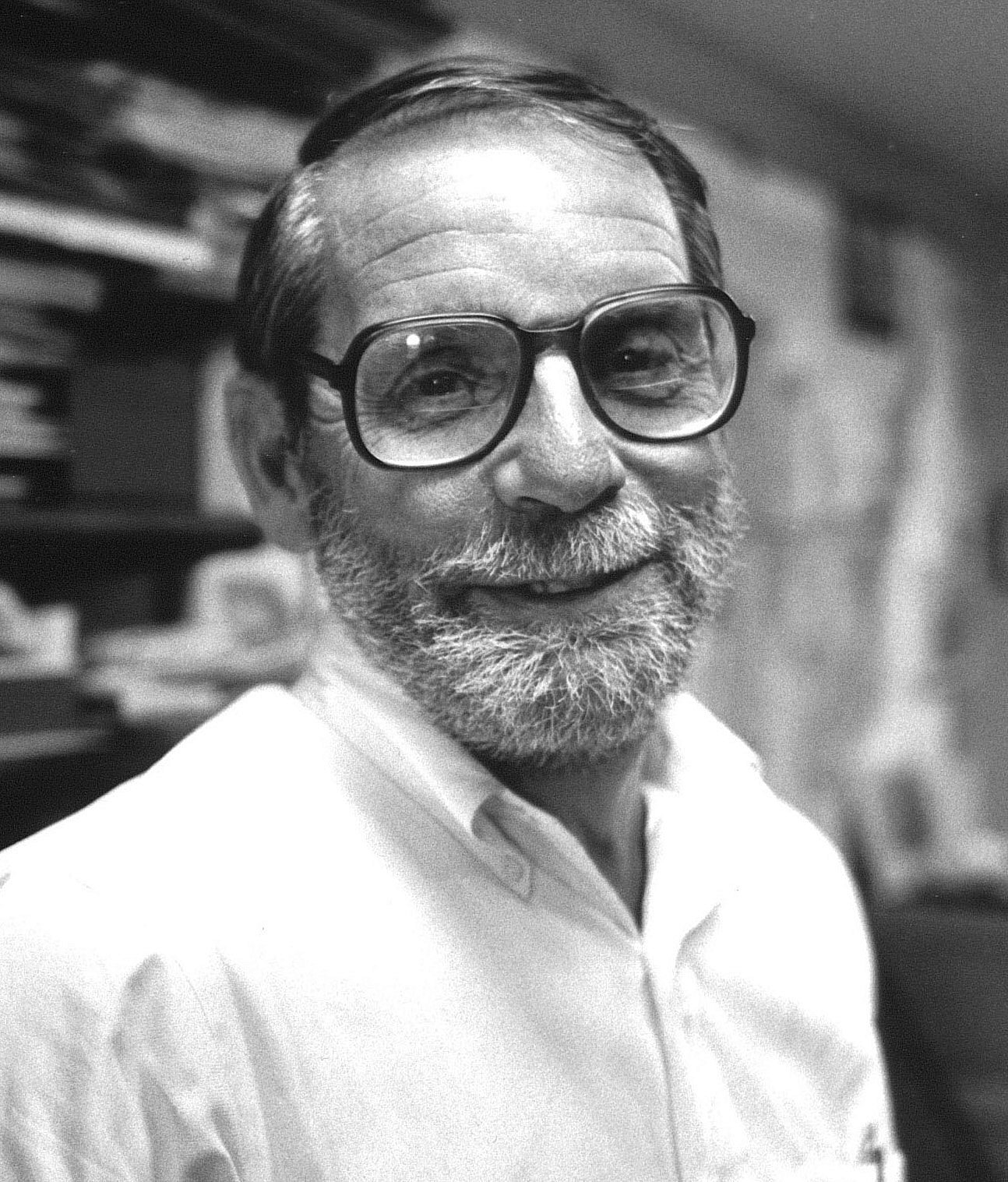
- Born: John Angus McPhee; March 8, 1931 (age 95); Princeton, New Jersey, U.S.
- Education: Princeton University; Magdelene College, Cambridge
- Occupation: Writer
- Spouse: Yolanda Whitman (second wife)
- Children: 4 (including Jenny McPhee, Martha McPhee, and Laura McPhee)

John Angus McPhee (born March 8, 1931) is an American author. He is considered one of the pioneers of creative nonfiction. He is a four-time finalist for the Pulitzer Prize in the category General Nonfiction, and he won that award on the fourth occasion in 1999 for Annals of the Former World (a collection of five books, including two of his previous Pulitzer finalists). In 2008, he received the George Polk Career Award for his "indelible mark on American journalism during his nearly half-century career". Since 1974, McPhee has been the Ferris Professor of Journalism at Princeton University.

== Background ==
McPhee has lived in Princeton, New Jersey, for most of his life. He was born in Princeton, the son of the Princeton University athletic department's physician, Harry McPhee. He was educated at Princeton High School, then spent a postgraduate year at Deerfield Academy, before graduating from Princeton University in 1953 with a senior thesis titled "Skimmer Burns" and spending a year at Magdalene College, Cambridge. McPhee was a member of University Cottage Club while a student at Princeton.

While at Princeton, McPhee went to New York once or twice a week to appear as the juvenile panelist on the radio and television quiz program Twenty Questions. One of his roommates at Princeton was 1951 Heisman Trophy winner Dick Kazmaier.

Twice married, McPhee is the father of four daughters from his first marriage to Pryde Brown: the novelists Jenny McPhee and Martha McPhee, photographer Laura McPhee, and architecture historian Sarah McPhee.

== Writing career ==
McPhee's writing career began at Time magazine, and led to a long association with the weekly magazine The New Yorker from 1963 to the present. Many of his 31 books include material originally written for The New Yorker, where he has been a staff writer since 1965.

Unlike Tom Wolfe and Hunter Thompson, who helped kick-start the "new journalism" of the 1960s, McPhee produced a gentler, more literary style of writing that more thoroughly incorporated techniques from fiction. He avoided Wolfe's and Thompson's stream-of-consciousness style, using detailed description of characters and vivid language to make his writing lively and personal, even when it focused on obscure or difficult topics. He is highly regarded by fellow writers for the quality, quantity, and diversity of his literary output.

Reflecting his personal interests, McPhee's subjects are highly eclectic. He has written pieces on lifting-body development (The Deltoid Pumpkin Seed), the psyche and experience of a nuclear physicist (The Curve of Binding Energy), a New Jersey wilderness area (The Pine Barrens), the United States Merchant Marine (Looking for a Ship), farmers' markets (Giving Good Weight), the movement of coal across America ("Coal Train" in Uncommon Carriers), the shifting flow of the Mississippi River ("Atchafalaya" in The Control of Nature), geology (in several books), as well as a short book entirely about oranges. One of his most widely read books, Coming into the Country, is about the three faces of Alaska: the urban, the rural, and the Alaskan wilderness.

McPhee has profiled a number of famous people, including conservationist David Brower in Encounters with the Archdruid, and the young Bill Bradley, whom McPhee followed closely during Bradley's four-year basketball career at Princeton University.

== Teaching ==
McPhee has been a nonfiction writing instructor at Princeton University since 1974, having taught generations of aspiring undergraduate writers as the Ferris Professor of Journalism. Many of his students have achieved distinction:

- Joel Achenbach, writer for the Washington Post and author of seven books
- Timothy Ferriss, entrepreneur and author of The 4-Hour Workweek and The 4-Hour Body
- Peter Hessler, contributor to The New Yorker and author of three books about China
- Jim Kelly, former managing editor of Time magazine
- Richard Preston, author of The Hot Zone and other books about infectious disease epidemics and bioterrorism
- David Remnick, Pulitzer Prize-winning author, and editor-in-chief of The New Yorker since 1998
- Eric Schlosser, author of Fast Food Nation and other books
- Richard Stengel, former managing editor of Time magazine
- Jennifer Weiner, best-selling author of Good In Bed, In Her Shoes, and other novels
- Robert Wright, former senior editor at The New Republic and columnist for Time, Slate and the New York Times, and author of award-winning books

== Awards and honors ==
McPhee has received many literary honors, including the Award in Literature from the American Academy of Arts and Letters and the 1999 Pulitzer Prize for General Nonfiction, awarded for Annals of the Former World. In 1978 he received a LittD from Bates College, in 2009 an honorary Doctorate of Letters from Yale University, in 2010 an honorary Doctor of Letters from Lehigh University, and in 2012 an honorary Doctorate of Humane Letters from Amherst College.

- Pulitzer Prize (1999) for Annals of the Former World
- Award in Literature from the American Academy of Arts and Letters (1977)
- Elected member of the American Academy of Arts and Sciences (1993)
- Finalist, National Book Award (science) for The Curve of Binding Energy
- Nominated, National Book Award (science), for Encounters with the Archdruid
- Wallace Stegner Award (2011) for "sustained contribution to the cultural identity of the West through literature, art, history, lore, or an understanding of the West".
- National Book Critics Circle Award Ivan Sandrof Lifetime Achievement Award (2017)

== Bibliography ==
=== Books ===
| Title | Date | Publication Details | Notes |
|---|---|---|---|
| A Sense of Where You Are: A Profile of William Warren Bradley | 1965 | New York: Farrar, Straus and Giroux; ISBN 0-374-51485-2 | A profile of Hall of Fame basketball player and Rhodes Scholar Bill Bradley. |
| The Headmaster: Frank L. Boyden, of Deerfield | 1966 | New York: Farrar, Straus and Giroux ISBN 0-374-16860-1 | Biography of Frank Boyden, long time headmaster of Deerfield Academy. |
| Oranges | 1967 | New York: Farrar, Straus and Giroux; ISBN 0-374-22688-1 | The history and significance of the farming of oranges, how farmers have struggled with frost and how horticulturists have introduced new breeds of citrus. |
| The Pine Barrens | 1968 | New York: Farrar, Straus and Giroux; ISBN 0-374-23360-8 | The story of the near wilderness central area of New Jersey, known since the seventeenth century as the Pine Barrens. |
| A Roomful of Hovings and Other Profiles | 1968 | New York: Farrar, Straus and Giroux; ISBN 0-374-51501-8 | Collection. |
| Levels of the Game | 1969 | New York: Farrar, Straus and Giroux; ISBN 0-374-51526-3 | Explores the relationship between two tennis players, Arthur Ashe and Clark Graebner, and their tennis match at the 1968 US Open. |
| The Crofter and the Laird | 1970 | New York: Farrar, Straus and Giroux; ISBN 0-374-13192-9 | A memoir of the author's stay with his family on the island of Colonsay in Scotland, where his forebears had been raised. |
| Encounters with the Archdruid | 1971 | New York: Farrar, Straus and Giroux; ISBN 0-374-14822-8 | Discussions in three wildernesses - on a coastal island, in a western mountain range, and on the Colorado River in the Grand Canyon - with "Archdruid" David Brower, founder of Friends of the Earth. |
| Wimbledon | 1972 | New York: The Viking Press; ISBN 0-670-77079-5 | Contains two essays – "Hoad on Court 5" (originally published in 1971 as "Centre Court" and collected in Pieces of the Frame) and "Twynam of Wimbledon" (originally published in 1968 and collected in A Roomful of Hovings) – and photographs by Alfred Eisenstaedt. |
| The Deltoid Pumpkin Seed | 1973 | New York: Farrar, Straus and Giroux; ISBN 0-374-51635-9 | Story of the Aereon, a combination aerodyne/aerostat, a.k.a. hybrid airship. |
| The Curve of Binding Energy | 1974 | New York: Farrar, Straus and Giroux; ISBN 0-374-13373-5 | Traveling American nuclear institutions with Theodore Taylor, one of the founders of those technologies. Finalist for the National Book Award. |
| Pieces of the Frame | 1975 | New York: Farrar, Straus and Giroux; ISBN 0-374-51498-4 | Collection. |
| The Survival of the Bark Canoe | 1975 | New York: Farrar, Straus and Giroux; ISBN 0-374-27207-7 | The story of the ancient craft of making birch-bark canoes, still practiced by a builder in a small town in New Hampshire. |
| The John McPhee Reader | 1976 | New York: Farrar, Straus and Giroux; ISBN 0-374-17992-1 | Collection of excerpts from his first twelve books, edited by William L. Howarth. |
| Coming into the Country | 1977 | New York: Farrar, Straus and Giroux; ISBN 0-374-52287-1 | The story of Alaska and the Alaskans. |
| Giving Good Weight | 1979 | New York: Farrar, Straus and Giroux; ISBN 0-374-16306-5 | Collection. Title story is about New York City's Greenmarkets in 1976-1977. |
| Alaska: Images of the Country | 1981 | San Francisco: Sierra Club Books; ISBN 0871562901 | Selections from Coming into the Country. Photographs by Galen Rowell. |
| Basin and Range | 1981 | New York: Farrar, Straus and Giroux; ISBN 0-374-10914-1 | First in his 'Annals of the Former World' series of books on geology and geologists. Republished in Annals of the Former World. Finalist for the Pulitzer Prize. |
| In Suspect Terrain | 1983 | New York: Farrar, Straus and Giroux; ISBN 0-374-17650-7 | Second book in his 'Annals of the Former World' series on geology and geologists, from the outwash plains of Brooklyn to the Appalachian landscape. Republished in Annals of the Former World. |
| Annals of the Former World. Two Volumes. Basin and Range, In Suspect Terrain | 1983 | New York: Farrar, Straus and Giroux | Limited to 450 numbered copies signed by McPhee on the limitation page of each volume. Full cloth with gilt lettering on spine. Issued without dustjackets. Illustrated slipcase. |
| La Place de la Concorde Suisse | 1984 | New York: Farrar, Straus and Giroux; ISBN 0-374-18241-8 | The study of the Swiss Army's role in Swiss society. Also published as The Swiss Army. |
| Table of Contents | 1985 | New York: Farrar, Straus and Giroux; ISBN 0-374-27241-7 | Collection. |
| Heirs of General Practice | 1986 | New York: Farrar, Straus and Giroux; ISBN 0-374-51974-9 | Stories of young doctors who specialize in family practice. Also included in the Table of contents collection. |
| In the Highlands and Islands | 1986 | London: Faber and Faber; ISBN 0-571-14599-X | Contains "The Crofter and the Laird" and three essays from Pieces of the Frame, all originally published in 1969 and 1970. |
| Rising from the Plains | 1986 | New York: Farrar, Straus and Giroux; ISBN 0-374-25082-0 | Third book in his 'Annals of the Former World' series on geology and geologists, covering the Rockies and surrounding areas. Republished in Annals of the Former World. Finalist for the Pulitzer Prize. |
| Outcroppings | 1988 | Layton: Gibbs Smith; ISBN 0879052627 | Writings on geology and ecology from Rising from the Plains, Basin and Range, and Encounters with the Archdruid. Photographs by Tom Till. Edited by Christopher Merrill. |
| The Control of Nature | 1989 | New York: Farrar, Straus and Giroux; ISBN 0-374-12890-1 | Three stories: the US Army Corps of Engineers' efforts to control the waters of the Mississippi near New Orleans; townspeople in Iceland cooling flowing lava to prevent it from flowing into their town; and residents of Los Angeles attempting to control debris flows that roar down mountain canyons. |
| Looking for a Ship | 1990 | New York: Farrar, Straus and Giroux; ISBN 0-374-19077-1 | The story of one of the last American merchant ships. Finalist for the Pulitzer Prize. |
| Assembling California | 1993 | New York: Farrar, Straus and Giroux; ISBN 0-374-10645-2 | Fourth book in his 'Annals of the Former World' series on geology and geologists. Surveys throughout California and elsewhere, describing the geologic history of the land. Republished in Annals of the Former World. |
| The Ransom of Russian Art | 1994 | New York: Farrar, Straus and Giroux; ISBN 0-374-24682-3 | The story of how an American professor of Soviet economics managed to remove thousands of works of art in the 1960s and 1970s from the Soviet Union to the US. |
| The Second John McPhee Reader | 1996 | New York: Farrar, Straus and Giroux; ISBN 0-374-52463-7 | Collection of excerpts from previously published nonfiction books and nonfiction essays, edited by Patricia Strachan. |
| Irons in the Fire | 1997 | New York: Farrar, Straus and Giroux; ISBN 0-374-17726-0 | Collection of essays. The title essay describes a trip to Nevada where, accompanying a brand inspector, the author discovers that cattle rustling is still practiced. |
| Annals of the Former World | 1998 | New York: Farrar, Straus and Giroux; ISBN 0-374-10520-0 | Compilation of four previously published books on geology, plus a final part, "Crossing the Craton". Winner of the Pulitzer Prize in 1999. |
| The Founding Fish | 2002 | New York: Farrar, Straus and Giroux; ISBN 0-374-10444-1 | The history of the shad, going back to the days of George Washington and Henry David Thoreau. |
| The American Shad: Selections from The Founding Fish | 2004 | Far Hills, N.J.: Meadow Run Press; ISBN 1-886967-14-8 | Limited edition. |
| Uncommon Carriers | 2006 | New York: Farrar, Straus and Giroux; ISBN 0-374-28039-8 | Essays on travels by several unconventional means, primarily ocean and water freight transportation. |
| Silk Parachute | 2010 | New York: Farrar, Straus and Giroux; ISBN 0-374-26373-6 | Collection. |
| The Princeton Reader: Contemporary Essays by Writers and Journalists at Princeton University | 2011 | Princeton, N.J.: Princeton University Press; ISBN 9780691143071 | Edited with Carol Rigolot. |
| Draft No. 4: On the Writing Process | 2017 | New York: Farrar, Straus and Giroux; ISBN 9780374142742 | Essays that form a guide to writing long-form nonfiction |
| The Patch | 2018 | New York: Farrar, Straus and Giroux; ISBN 978-0374229481 | His seventh collection of essays |
| Tabula Rasa | 2023 | New York: Farrar, Straus and Giroux; ISBN 978-0374603601 | A collection of vignettes reflecting upon his writing career and projects he once planned to do but never got around to |

=== Essays and reporting ===
- "Progression : how and what?". The Writing Life. The New Yorker. 87 (36): 36, 39–42. November 14, 2011.
- "Structure : beyond the picnic-table crisis". The Writing Life. The New Yorker. 88 (43): 46–55. January 14, 2013.
- "Draft No. 4 : replacing the words in boxes". The Writing Life. The New Yorker. 89 (11): 32–38. April 29, 2013.
- "The Orange Trapper : compulsions are hard to explain". The Sporting Scene. The New Yorker. 89 (19): 30–34. July 1, 2013.
- "Tabula rasa : volume one". Personal History. The New Yorker. 95 (44): 46–55. January 13, 2020.
- "Tabula rasa : volume four". Personal History. The New Yorker. 100 (13): 28–33. May 20, 2024.

== See also ==
- Books by John McPhee
- Looking for a Story: A Complete Guide to the Writings of John McPhee by Noel Rubinton, Princeton University Press 2025 ISBN 978-0691244921
