= Eliot Porter =

American photographer (1901–1990)

Eliot Furness Porter
- Born: December 6, 1901; Winnetka, Illinois, U.S.
- Died: November 2, 1990 (aged 88); Santa Fe, New Mexico, U.S.
- Education: Harvard University (AB, MD)
- Relatives: Fairfield Porter (brother)

Eliot Furness Porter (December 6, 1901 – November 2, 1990) was an American photographer best known for his color photographs of nature.

== Early life and education ==
Porter credited his father, James Porter, with instilling in him a love for nature as well as a commitment to scientific rigor. An amateur photographer since childhood, Eliot Porter found early inspiration photographing the birds on Maine's Great Spruce Head Island owned by his family. Porter earned a Bachelor of Arts degree in chemical engineering from Harvard College and a Doctor of Medicine from Harvard Medical School, and remained at Harvard after graduation as a medical researcher. One of Eliot Porter's five siblings was the painter and art critic Fairfield Porter.

== Career ==
Fairfield Porter introduced his older brother to photographer and gallerist Alfred Stieglitz in about 1930. Stieglitz, after seeing Porter's work, encouraged Porter to work harder. Finally, in 1938, Stieglitz presented Porter's work, taken with a Linhof view camera, in his New York City gallery, An American Place. The exhibit's success prompted Porter to pursue photography full-time.

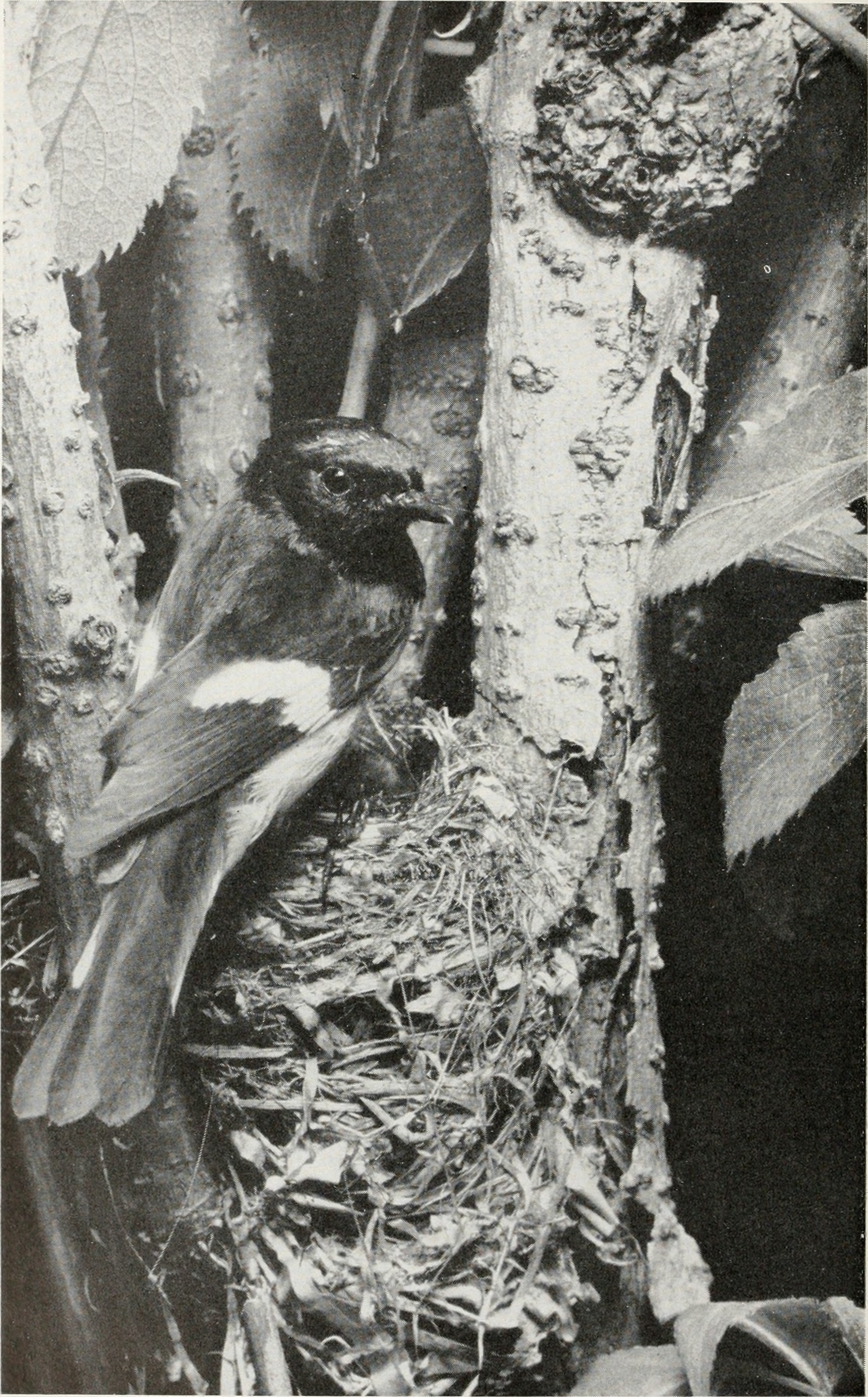
Southern American Redstart, male

Porter became interested in colour photography after a publisher rejected a proposal for a book on birds because black and white images wouldn't clearly differentiate the species. Porter began working with a new color film, Kodachrome, introduced in 1935, but it presented considerable technical challenges, especially for capturing fast-moving birds. Drawing on his chemical engineering and research background Porter experimented extensively until he was able to produce satisfactory images. His bird photographs were exhibited in 1943, the first ever exhibition of color photographs at the Museum of Modern Art, New York. His book American Birds: 10 Photographs in Color was published in 1953. His solo exhibition at Limelight Gallery, NYC., March 21-April 17, 1955 was effectively a retrospective of this work.

For twenty years, Porter pursued a project to publish nature photographs combined with quotes from works by Henry David Thoreau. Not until an associate introduced him to the executive director of the Sierra Club did Porter find a willing publisher. His 1962 book, In Wildness Is the Preservation of the World featured Porter's color nature studies of the New England woods. The book enjoyed considerable success despite its high price, pioneered the genre of the nature photography coffee-table book, and lead to several other titles by Porter in a similar format published by the Sierra Club and others. It increased Porter's reputation greatly, and he served as a director of the Sierra Club from 1965 to 1971. He was elected a Fellow of the American Academy of Arts and Sciences in 1971. In 1979 the work of Eliot Porter was exhibited in Intimate Landscapes, the first one-person show of color photography at The Metropolitan Museum of Art, New York. This exhibition earned Porter praise as the individual who brought credibility to color photography as a medium of fine art. The image selection defined what is now meant by the term “intimate landscape”: the close-range, quiet compositions of natural elements with muted colors and dense textures, meditative and dense with layered meanings, which were the hallmark of Porter's work at the exclusion of more expansive and spectacular landscapes.

Porter traveled extensively to photograph ecologically important and culturally significant places. He published books of photographs from Glen Canyon in Utah, Maine, Baja California, Galápagos Islands, Antarctica, East Africa, and Iceland. His cultural studies included Mexico, Egypt, China, Czechoslovakia, and ancient Greek sites. His book on Glen Canyon, The Place No One Knew, memorialized the canyon's appearance before its inundation by the Lake Powell reservoir.

James Gleick’s book Chaos: Making a New Science (1987) caused Porter to reexamine his work in the context of chaos theory. They collaborated on a project published in 1990 as Nature's Chaos, which combined his photographs with a new essay by Gleick. Porter died in Santa Fe, New Mexico in 1990 and bequeathed his personal archive to the Amon Carter Museum of American Art in Fort Worth, Texas.

== Personal life ==
Eliot Porter's brother, Fairfield Porter, was a realist painter and art critic. His brother-in-law, Michael W. Straus, was a commissioner of the United States Bureau of Reclamation. Eliot was married to Marian Brown from 1927 until their divorce in 1934. He married Aline Kilham in 1936 and the two moved to Santa Fe, New Mexico together, living in Tesuque, New Mexico from 1946.

== Books ==
- In Wildness Is the Preservation of the World, 1962.
- The Place No One Knew, Glen Canyon on the Colorado, 1963.
- Summer Island: Penobscot country, 1966.
- Antarctica, 1978.
- Intimate Landscapes, 1979.
- Southwest, 1985.
- Eliot Porter, 1987.
- Birds of North America A Personal Selection", 1972
- Nature’s Chaos, 1990.
