= Hugh Carson Cutler =

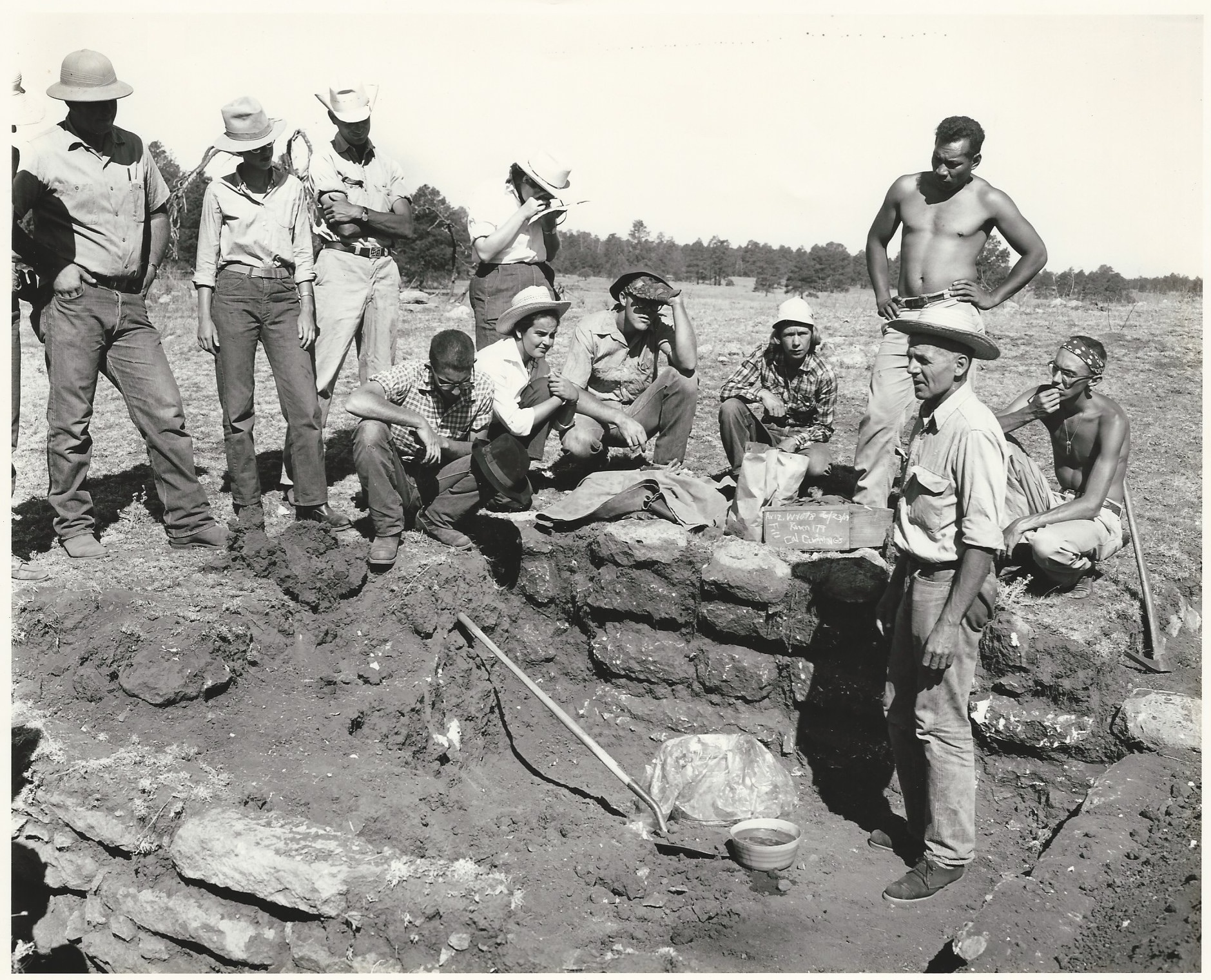
- Hugh Cutler demonstrating flotation at Point of Pines Field School in Arizona 23 June 1957.

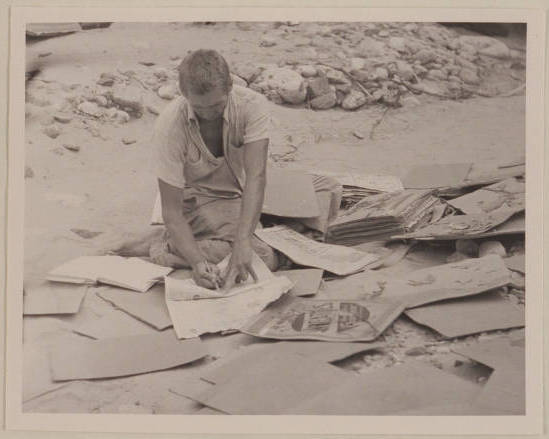
Boatman and Botanist. Colorado River Trip, 1940-08-20, photo by Barry M. Goldwater, Huntington Library, The Otis Marston Colorado River Collection

Hugh Carson Cutler (8 September 1912, Milwaukee, Wisconsin – 12 September 1998, Topeka, Kansas) was a plant taxonomist, economic botanist, plant collector, and pioneer of paleoethnobotany.

== Biography ==
Cutler graduated from the University of Wisconsin–Madison with B.A. in 1935 and M.A. in 1936 and from Washington University in St. Louis with Ph.D. in 1939. His doctoral dissertation was "Monograph of the North American species of the genus Ephedra" . After completing his Ph.D. in 1939 he floated the San Juan River (Colorado River tributary) by himself from Bluff, Utah, to Mexican Hat, Utah. In 1940, Cutler and Martin Withers boated the San Juan from Shiprock, New Mexico, to Aneth, Utah. Cutler met Norman Nevills who hired Cutler to row a boat on one of the early commercial river-running trips down the Colorado River from Green River, Wyoming to Lake Mead through the Grand Canyon. Cutler worked on the boats for two weeks before the start. Due to faulty planning, oars for Cutler's boat did not arrive and a frail 8-foot pair was borrowed and soon broken. Cutler improvised with poles on which were nailed box ends. These worked for the run through Lodore Canyon at Dinosaur National Monument. At Jensen, Utah, supplementary equipment was salvaged from driftwood piles. Barry Goldwater was a trip participant and the two became lifelong friends. The trip took 60-days and near the end of the trip Cutler and Goldwater tobogganed the rapid at Diamond Creek (Arizona) aided by air mattresses. The people who watched from shore raised the question whether the men rode the mattresses or the mattresses rode them. Cutler was listed by Otis R. Marston as the 71st person to travel by boat from Lee's Ferry, Arizona, through Grand Canyon to Lake Mead.

On 26 August 1940 Cutler married Marian W. Cornell (1917–2015). In 1940 Hugh and Marian Cutler collected wild varieties of Tripsacum and cultivated maize (including archaeological samples) in the southwestern United States, Mexico, and Guatemala. From 1941 to 1947 he was a research associate at Harvard Botanical Museum. He held Guggenheim Fellowships for the academic years 1942–1943 and 1946–1947. From 1941 to 1946 Hugh and Marian Cutler collected botanical specimens in Peru, Bolivia, and Brazil. With the distinguished botanist Martín Cárdenas, he wrote the first study on the races of maize in Bolivia. Influenced by Cárdenas, Cutler studied the food production and preparation methods used by the Aymara and Quechua Indians of the Cochabamba Valley and the Lake Titicaca basin. From 1943 to 1945 he was on leave on absence from Harvard University and did his war service working for the Rubber Development Corporation under the auspices of the Board of Economic Warfare. He flew in blimps over northern Brazil and identified wild rubber trees that could be harvested by ground parties.

After teaching at Harvard for a year after the war, Cutler was appointed Curator of Economic Botany at the Field Museum in Chicago. From this time onwards his most important work was in archaeological botany, especially in analysing prehistoric remains of maize and squashes from the American Southwest and Mexico. During this tenure he forged many links with archaeologists and became well known for developing techniques for recovering floral materials from ancient remains.

In 1953 Cutler resigned from the Field Museum of Natural History and that same year became Curator of Economic Botany at the Missouri Botanical Garden. Cutler was back on the Colorado River the next year after befriending river runner Otis Marston. Culter joined Marston and others on 1954, 1956, and 1957 Grand Canyon river runs. On the 1956 river trip, the twin outboard motorboat Cutler was riding in flipped in Lava Falls Rapid, the first record of a boat flip at that rapid. On the 1957 river trip, the Colorado River in Grand Canyon peaked at 124,000 cubic feet per second, the highest flow ever recorded that was run by river runners in Grand Canyon. On all these river trips, Cutler collected plant specimens. He retired from the Missouri Botanical Garden in 1977.

Upon his retirement his archaeological maize and cucurbit collection was sent to the Illinois State Museum in Springfield and is now curated as the Cutler-Blake Collection (whose title also honours Cutler's co-author Leonard Blake). His collection of more than 12,000 ears of ethnographic maize was transferred to the Department of Agriculture at the University of Illinois, Urbana-Champaign.

Hugh and Marian Cutler's son William Cornell Cutler was born in 1946.

== Selected publications ==
- Cutler, Hugh Carson (1939). "Monograph of the North American Species of the Genus Ephedra". Annals of the Missouri Botanical Garden. 26 (4): 373–428. doi:10.2307/2394299. JSTOR 2394299.
- Cutler, Hugh C.; Anderson, Edgar (1941). "A Preliminary Survey of the Genus Tripsacum". Annals of the Missouri Botanical Garden. 28 (3): 249. doi:10.2307/2394349. JSTOR 2394349.
- Anderson, E.; Cutler, H. C. (1942). "Races of Zea mays: I. Their recognition and classification" (PDF). Annals of the Missouri Botanical Garden. 29 (2): 69–88. doi:10.2307/2394331. JSTOR 2394331.
- Cutler, Hugh C. (1946). "Races of Maize in South America". Botanical Museum Leaflets, Harvard University. 12 (8): 257–291. doi:10.5962/p.295169. JSTOR 41762091.
- Cutler, Hugh C.; Cárdenas, Martín (1947). "Chicha, A Native South American Beer". Botanical Museum Leaflets, Harvard University. 13 (3): 33–60. doi:10.5962/p.295173. JSTOR 41762102.
- Cutler, Hugh C.; Cutler, Marian C. (1948). "Studies on the Structure of the Maize Plant". Annals of the Missouri Botanical Garden. 35 (4): 301–316. doi:10.2307/2394695. JSTOR 2394695.
- Braidwood, Robert J.; Sauer, Jonathan D.; Helbaek, Hans; Mangelsdorf, Paul C.; Cutler, Hugh C.; Coon, Carleton S.; Linton, Ralph; Steward, Julian; Oppenheim, A. Leo (1953). "Did man once live by beer alone" (PDF). American Anthropologist. 55 (4): 515–526. doi:10.1525/aa.1953.55.4.02a00050.
- Whitaker, Thomas W.; Cutler, Hugh C.; MacNeish, Richard S. (1957). "Cucurbit Materials from Three Caves Near Ocampo, Tamaulipas". American Antiquity. 22 (4): 352–358. doi:10.2307/276133. JSTOR 276133. S2CID 162369043.
- Cutler, Hugh C.; Whitaker, Thomas W. (1961). "History and Distribution of the Cultivated Cucurbits in the Americas". American Antiquity. 26 (4): 469–485. doi:10.2307/278735. JSTOR 278735. S2CID 161495351.
- Brooks, Richard H.; Kaplan, Lawrence; Cutler, Hugh C.; Whitaker, Thomas W. (1962). "Plant Material from a Cave on the Rio Zape, Durango, Mexico". American Antiquity. 27 (3): 356–369. doi:10.2307/277801. JSTOR 277801. S2CID 162388620.
- Whitaker, Thomas W.; Cutler, Hugh C. (1965). "Cucurbits and Cultures in the Americas". Economic Botany. 19 (4): 344–349. Bibcode:1965EcBot..19..344W. doi:10.1007/BF02904804. JSTOR 4252643. S2CID 23229062.
- Whitaker, Thomas W.; Cutler, Hugh C. (1966). "Food Plants in a Mexican Market". Economic Botany. 20 (1): 6–16. Bibcode:1966EcBot..20....6W. doi:10.1007/BF02861922. JSTOR 4252698. S2CID 22510054.
- Wolf, M. J.; Cutler, H. C.; Zuber, M. S.; Khoo, Uheng (1972). "Maize with Multilayer Aleurone of High Protein Content 1". Crop Science. 12 (4): 440–442. doi:10.2135/cropsci1972.0011183X001200040012x. S2CID 84764013.
- Blake, Leonard W.; Cutler, Hugh Carson (2001). Plants from the Past: Works Of Leonard W. Blake & Hugh C. Cutler. University of Alabama Press. ISBN 978-0-8173-1087-5.

== See also ==
- Cucurbita ecuadorensis
