= Elzada Clover =

American botanist

Elzada U. Clover
- Born: 12 September 1896; Auburn, Nebraska, United States
- Died: 2 November 1980 (aged 83); McAllen, Texas
- Education: Nebraska State Teachers College (1930); University of Michigan, Ann Arbor (1932; 1935)
- Scientific career
- Fields: Botany
- Workplaces: University of Michigan

Elzada Clover (1896–1980) was an American botanist who was the first to catalog plant life in the Grand Canyon on the Colorado River. Clover and Lois Jotter became the first two women to raft the entire length of the Grand Canyon.

== Early life and education ==
Elzada Urseba Clover was born in Auburn, Nebraska in 1896, the seventh of nine children of Maynard French Clover and Sarah Gates Clover. She had six sisters (Maude, Alice, Mabel, Bessie, Vida, and Cora) and two brothers (Verne and Maynard). She grew up on her father's farm and attended high school in the nearby town of Peru. Her mother died in 1913 and her father remarried around 1925 and moved to Texas, where he set up as a farmer near Alamo. Her interest in cacti began after this move.

Clover began her career as a public school teacher in 1919, working first in Nebraska and later in Texas; she was the principal of the South Mission School in Mission in the latter state. This was an elementary school for Mexican American children only. She could speak English and Spanish. She graduated from Nebraska State Teachers College in 1930 and went on to the University of Michigan, Ann Arbor, for her M.S. (1932) and Ph.D. (1935) degrees. The subject of her doctoral thesis was the vegetation of the lower Rio Grande Valley, specifically the cacti.

== Career ==
After obtaining her doctorate, Clover joined the faculty at the University of Michigan as an instructor in botany and the assistant curator of the university's botanical gardens. Eventually she rose to the position of curator of the botanical gardens (1957) and full professor of botany (1960). She also taught at the university's Biological Station in Pellston.

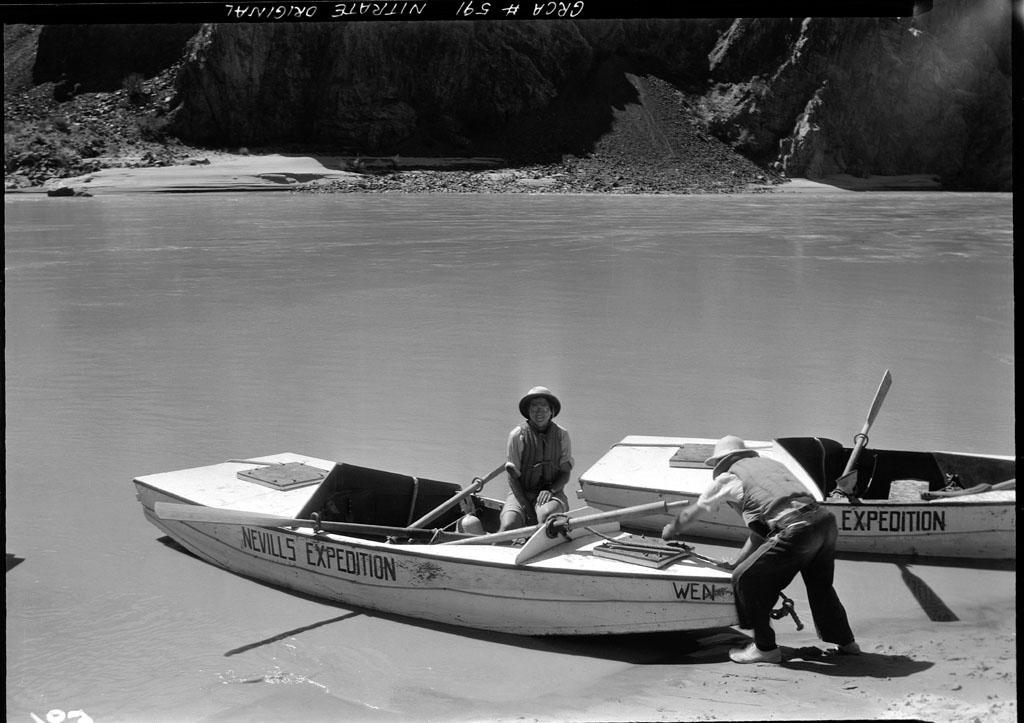
Dr. Elzada Clover at Bright Angel Creek in Grand Canyon, July 1938

Clover was instrumental in establishing the cactus and succulent areas of the botanical gardens. She made numerous expeditions throughout the Southwest in search of native plant species for the university collection, focusing initially on cacti of the Colorado Plateau in Utah. In the late 1930s, she started planning a research trip down the Colorado River to catalog its flora, and the university gave her some funding for the trip in the expectation that it would yield specimens for its collection. Although she originally intended to go by pack mule, she discussed the idea of going by boat instead with the pioneering Colorado River boatman, Norman Nevills, whom she met on a collecting expedition in Mexican Hat, Utah.

In the 1930s, boating the Grand Canyon was a rare event. A few men had done it successfully, but the only woman to have tried it had not survived her attempt. Asked about the general opinion that the Grand Canyon trip was no place for a woman, Clover responded: "Just because the only woman who ever attempted this trip was drowned is no reason women have any more to fear than men."

The Clover and Nevills 1938 expedition traveled from the town of Green River in Utah through the Cataract and Grand Canyons all the way to Lake Mead. The trip took 43 days in three boats that were custom-built by Nevills and his father—the Wen, the Botany, and the Mexican Hat—and covered more than 600 miles all told. In the course of this trip, Clover became the first botanist to catalog plant life along the river in the Grand Canyon. Clover and graduate student, Lois Jotter, became the first women to complete a river run of the Grand Canyon. Also on the trip were graduate students, Eugene Atkinson, artist Bill Gibson (who took photographs and film of the trip), and, as Nevills's assistant, a U.S. Geological Survey geologist named Don Harris. Part way through the trip, due to tensions among expedition members, Atkinson left and was replaced by photographer Emery Kolb.

Clover and Jotter made plant lists and collected specimens throughout the trip, although the rigors of the journey—especially lack of space and difficulty keeping specimens dry—meant that they ended up with fewer specimens than they had hoped. They described the canyon as having five plant zones, from the moist sand along the river's edge up to higher zones with shrubs and trees. Most of what they found were typical riparian species, with a major exception being tamarisk, a non-native species that they saw in a few locations. They found very little snakeweed, which has since become common throughout the canyon. Their survey remains the only comprehensive one of the river's riparian species in the era before Glen Canyon Dam was built. After the trip, Clover and Jotter published the botanical findings of the trip in a 1944 issue of American Midland Naturalist.

Clover's next expedition was on the San Juan River and in Texas, where she gathered fossil plant specimens, which was followed by a 1939 trip to Havasupai Canyon in Arizona. She published the findings from these trips in a 1941 article co-authored with Jotter entitled "Cacti of the Colorado River and Tributaries". In the years afterward, Clover focused her research on the deserts of Mexico and Guatemala and also did some work in Haiti.

Clover joined a number of professional societies, including the American Association for the Advancement of Science, the Botanical Society of America, and the Michigan Academy of Science. She retired from the university in 1967 and moved to the Rio Grande Valley of Texas. She died in 1980, and her papers are now held by Bentley Historical Library at the University of Michigan.

== Selected publications ==
- Clover, Elzada U. & Jotter, Lois (1944). "Floristic Studies in the Canyon of the Colorado and Tributaries". American Midland Naturalist. 32 (3): 591–642. doi:10.2307/2421241. JSTOR 2421241.
- Clover, Elzada U. & Jotter, Lois (1941). "Cacti of the Canyon of the Colorado River and Tributaries". Bulletin of the Torrey Botanical Club. 68 (6): 409–419. doi:10.2307/2481651. JSTOR 2481651.
- Clover, Elzada U. (1938). "The Cactaceae of Southern Utah". Bulletin of the Torrey Botanical Club. 65 (6): 397–412. doi:10.2307/2481220. JSTOR 2481220.

== In popular culture ==
- Elzada Clover appears as a character investigating a murder in the 2009 mystery novel The Butterflies of the Grand Canyon by Margaret Erhart.
- Poet Jessy Randall included a tribute to Clover in her 2025 collection of poems about women scientists, The Path of Most Resistance.
