= Lois Jotter =

American botanist

Mary Lois Jotter Cutter (March 11, 1914–April 30, 2013) was an American botanist. Jotter and Elzada Clover were the first women to raft the entire length of the Grand Canyon in 1938, making scientific collections of plants along the way.

== Early life and education ==
Born Mary Lois Jotter on March 11, 1914 in Weaverville, California, she was interested in science and botany from a young age. Her father, E.V. Jotter, a German Mennonite who taught forestry at the University of Michigan, and her mother, Artie May Lomb, encouraged her to study science while growing up in Michigan. She graduated from the University of Michigan with a bachelor's degree in botany and biology and continued her studies in botany, obtaining a doctorate from the University of Michigan in 1943. Her graduate studies focused on the cytogenetics of the evening primrose.

== Grand Canyon Expedition ==
Jotter's mentor at the University of Michigan, Elzada Clover, invited her to join a boating expedition along the Colorado River through the Grand Canyon in the summer of 1938, during her graduate studies. The women planned to document and gather native plant species during the trip. At the time, only a few men had successfully boated down the Colorado and the only woman to attempt it, Bessie Hyde had died in the attempt. Some of the women's colleagues and family members discouraged their participation in the trip due to the associated danger; other were fully supportive. The novelty of the women's involvement generated significant press coverage at the time; articles tended to focus on the botanists' gender, appearance, and age rather than their scientific goals.

The expedition departed Green River, Utah on June 20 with a plan to travel the Colorado River through the Cataract Canyon and Grand Canyon all the way to Lake Mead, Arizona - 666 miles. The group set out in three boats built by the trip organizer Norman Nevills, the Wen, the Botany, and the Mexican Hat on June 20, 1938. Other members of the initial group included: Eugene Atkinson, a zoology graduate student at the University of Michigan, Don Harris, an engineer with the U.S. Geological Survey, and Bill Gibson, an artist from San Francisco. The first half of the trip was tainted by conflict and Nevills sent Atkinson home during a stop at Lee's Ferry.

It took the group 43 days total (36 of those were spent on the river) to travel from Green River to Lake Mead, a few days more than expected, partially due to frequent stops so Jotter and Clover could gather specimens. At one point, the Coast Guard sent out a plane to search for the group. They were found and signaled all was well. The expedition ended on August 1, 1938 to much fanfare and press coverage. The Associated Press headline stated "Women Make Perilous Trip Through Colorado Gorges".

During the expedition, Jotter and Clover recorded and gathered many plant species along the river. They traveled with handmade plant presses, cinched tight with leather straps. In her trip logbook, Jotter wrote, "we collected furiously." In 1941, Jotter and Clover published a paper on the cactus they found, as well as a comprehensive plant list. In their publications, they identified four new species of cactus: Grand Canyon claret cup (Echinocereus canyonensis); small flower fishhook cactus (Sclerocactus parviflorus); strawberry hedgehog cactus (Echinocereus decumbens); and an elongated variety of beavertail prickly pear (Opuntia longiareolata). Their research was the only botanical survey of the Colorado River documenting the plant life before the Glen Canyon Dam significantly altered it beginning in 1966.

== Career and later life ==
Jotter was an Assistant Professor of Biology at UNC-Greensboro from 1963 until she retired in 1984.

In 1994, she returned to the Grand Canyon for a second time as part of a scientific expedition to study environmental change in the area. The group used Jotter and Clover's plant list from 1938 as the basis of their work to restore native species destroyed by the Glen Canyon Dam.

Jotter died of congestive heart failure on April 30, 2013 in Greensboro, NC. At the time of her death at age 99, Jotter was the last surviving member of the 1938 Grand Canyon expedition. Clover had died in 1980.

== Personal life ==
She married Guatemalan botanist Dr. Victor Cutter, Jr. in 1942, and they had two children, Ann and Vic Cutter. Her husband died in 1962.
