= Facing Your Danger =

1946 film

- Directed by: Edwin E. Olsen
- Written by: DeLeon Anthony
- Produced by: Gordon Hollingshead
- Starring: non listed
- Narrated by: Knox Manning
- Cinematography: Edwin E. Olsen
- Edited by: DeLeon Anthony
- Music by: Rex Dunn
- Production company: Vitaphone
- Distributed by: Warner Bros.
- Release date: May 11, 1946
- Running time: 10 minutes
- Country: United States
- Language: English

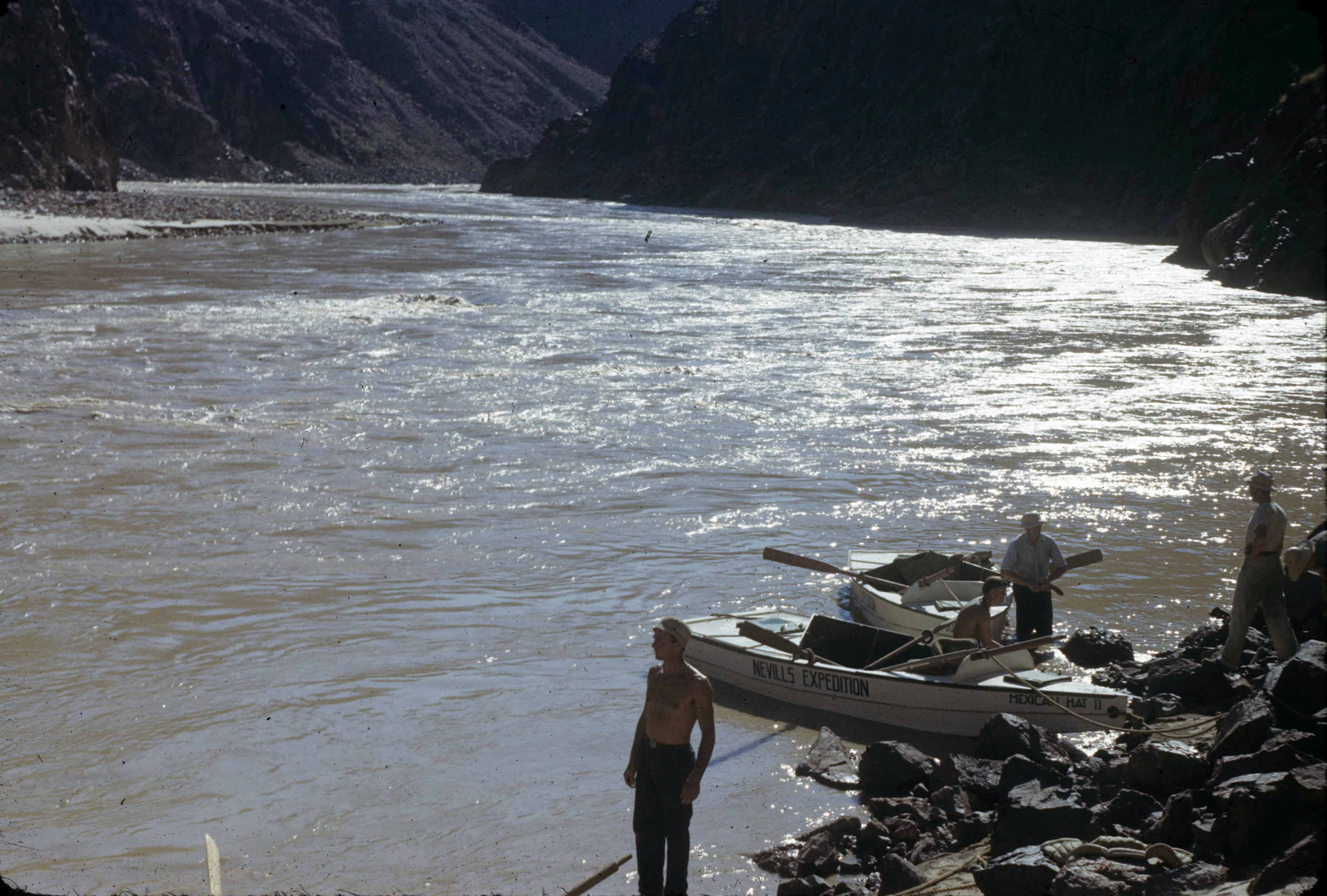
River runners at Pipe Creek during filming, July 23, 1942

Facing Your Danger is a 1946 American short film. The cameraman was amateur filmmaker Edwin E. Olsen. Using a Cine-Kodak and 16mm Kodachrome film, Olsen shot the film in 1942 on a Grand Canyon river trip conducted by Norman Nevills. Another amateur cameraman on the trip was Otis R. Marston. When Olsen ran out of film, Marston, who had brought 6,000 feet of Kodachrome magazines, provided Olsen with what he needed. Olsen edited the film and sold it to Warner Brothers in 1946. Lee Anthony and Gordon Hollingshead collaborated to re-edit and shorten the film to a one reel for theater release.

Facing Your Danger won an Oscar at the 19th Academy Awards in 1947 for Best Short Subject (One-Reel). This was the first time an Academy Award went to a film shot by an amateur filmmaker using a 16mm camera.

== Cast ==
- Norman Nevills as Self
