= Bert Loper =

American river runner (1869–1949)

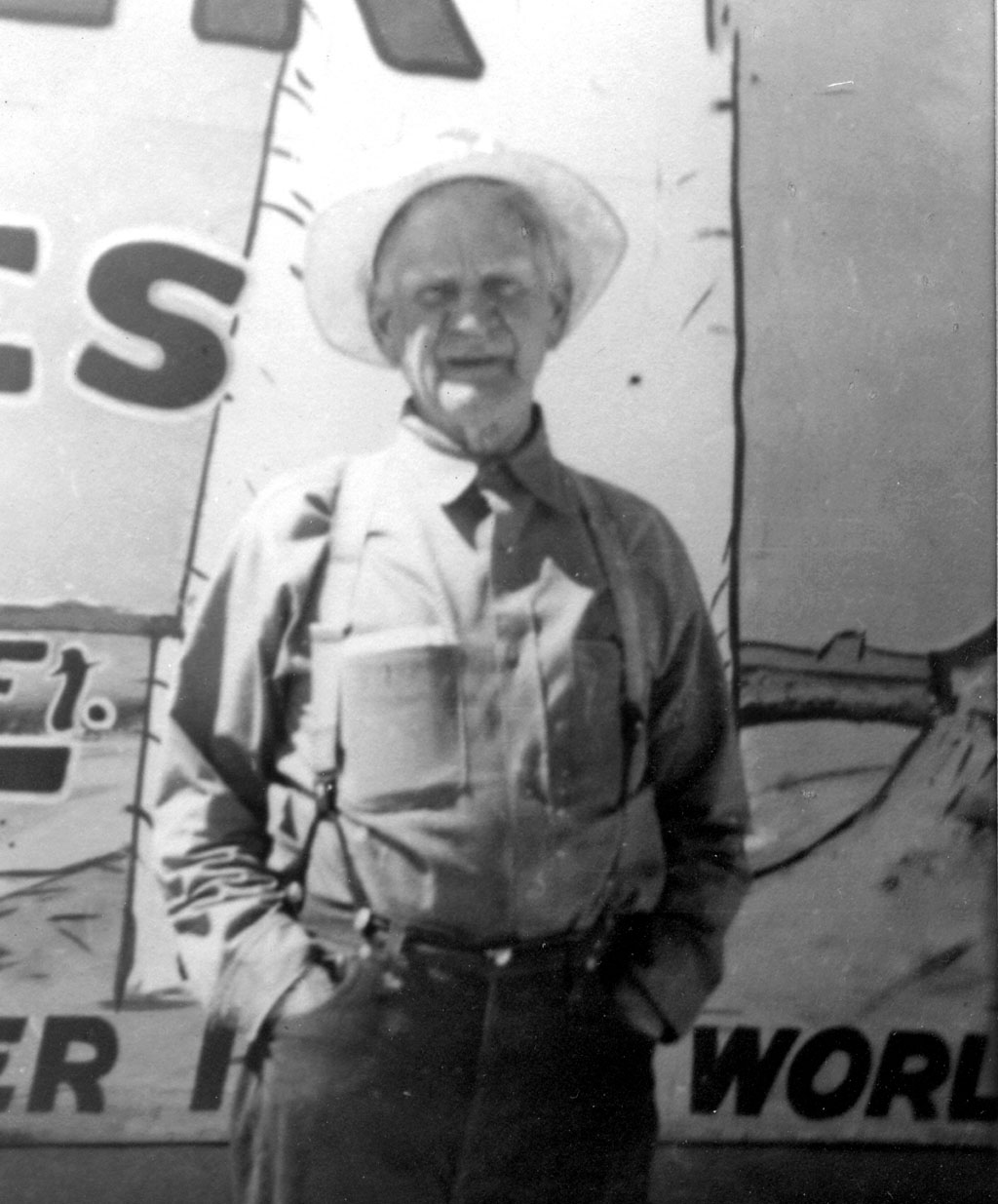
Bert Loper about 1935. Grand Canyon National Park Photo

Albert A. "Bert" Loper (July 31, 1869 – July 8, 1949) was a pioneer of the sport of whitewater river-running in the American Southwest, particularly the Colorado River and its tributaries. He, along with many of the noted boatmen of his era, including Charles Russell, Julius Stone, Ellsworth Kolb, and others, were among the first (and last) people to navigate the Colorado River before the construction of Glen Canyon Dam and Navajo Dam.

== Biography ==
Loper discovered his love of river running while placer mining on the San Juan River. In 1907, using three boats, Loper, along with Charles Russell and Edwin Monett, attempted to boat from Green River, Utah through the Grand Canyon. Loper left Russell and Monett in Glen Canyon on November 1, 1907, to repair a camera and was to rejoin the two other men at Lees Ferry not later than December 1. The two men waited for Loper at the Ferry until December 13, 1907, then proceeded into Marble Canyon without Loper. Russell and Monett completed their river cruise through the Grand Canyon and arrived at Needles, California, on February 8, 1908, with one boat.

In 1920, Loper acted as lead boatman on the USGS survey mission to find a suitable damsite in the Black Canyon, the future site of Hoover Dam. Notable water czar William Mulholland also joined this expedition. Loper expected to get the head boatman job for the 1923 river survey of the Grand Canyon, but Emery Kolb got the job instead. Loper finally made his first boating run through the Grand Canyon in 1939 on a two-boat trip with Chester Klevin, Bill Gibson, and Don Harris. The two boatmen on the trip, Loper and Harris, both ran their wooden boats through Lava Falls, the first time two boats on any one trip had attempted this. Loper was the oldest person to pilot a boat through Lava Falls at the time.

In 1949, struggling with a heart condition, the 79-year-old Loper attempted another river run of the Colorado River through Grand Canyon. Launching on July 7, 1949, Loper, Harris, and six others attempted the run. Loper was rowing his self-built boat, The Grand Canyon, through 24½ Mile Rapid in the Marble Gorge of the Grand Canyon on July 8, 1949, when he became unresponsive and his boat flipped in the rapid. River historian Otis "Dock" Marston speculated Loper, with his perilous heart condition, was most likely dead before the boat flipped.

A skull and other bones, subsequently identified as Loper's, were recovered in 1975 near the mouth of Cardenas Creek, some 46 miles downstream of the point where Loper's boat capsized.

A small monument to his life and accomplishments on the Colorado River remains in the Grand Canyon on the banks of the Colorado River at the site where his boat was found. Norman Nevills, the famous Colorado guide who found the wreck, noted its shoddy construction.

A large monument to Bert Loper stands in what is considered his hometown, Green River, Utah.
