= Holmström =

Holmström is a Swedish-language surname.

== Geographical distribution ==
As of 2014, 71.5% of all known bearers of the surname Holmström were residents of Sweden (frequency 1:1,444) and 26.7% of Finland (1:2,162).

In Sweden, the frequency of the surname was higher than national average (1:1,444) in the following counties:

1. Västerbotten County (1:321)
2. Norrbotten County (1:534)
3. Västmanland County (1:1,179)
4. Blekinge County (1:1,184)
5. Gävleborg County (1:1,327)
6. Dalarna County (1:1,333)
7. Västernorrland County (1:1,333)
8. Stockholm County (1:1,402)

In Finland, the frequency of the surname was higher than national average (1:2,162) in the following regions:

1. Åland (1:139)
2. Ostrobothnia (1:960)
3. Uusimaa (1:1,110)
4. Southwest Finland (1:1,643)

== People ==
- Agne Holmström (1893–1949), Swedish sprinter
- August Wilhelm Holmström, Finnish and Russian silversmith and goldsmith
- Axel Holmström (anarchist) (1881–1947), Swedish anarchist
- Axel Holmström (ice hockey) (born 1996), Swedish ice hockey player
- Ben Holmstrom (born 1987), American ice hockey player
- Bengt R. Holmström (born 1949), economist
- Bodil Holmström, Finnish orienteering competitor
- Britta Holmström, Swedish philanthropist and aid worker
- Buzz Holmstrom (1909–1946), American pioneer
- Carita Holmström (born 1954), Finnish pianist, singer and songwriter
- John Holmstrom, American cartoonist and writer
- Karl Holmström (1925–1974), Swedish ski jumper
- Kjell Holmström (1916–1999), Swedish bobsledder
- Lakshmi Holmström, writer, literary critic and translator of Tamil fiction into English
- Peter Holmström, American rock musician
- Rick Holmstrom (born 1965), American blues guitarist, singer and songwriter
- Simon Holmström (born 2001), Swedish ice hockey player
- Susanne Holmström (born 1947), Danish sociologist, best known for her writings on organizational legitimacy
- Tomas Holmström (born 1973), Swedish ice hockey player
- Tora Vega Holmström (1880–1967), Swedish painter
- Kevin Holmström (born 1993), Ostrobothnian musician

== See also ==
- Holmström's theorem, impossibility theorem attributed to Bengt R. Holmström
