= Disappearance of Glen and Bessie Hyde =

Unresolved 1928 disappearance on the Colorado River

Glen and Bessie Hyde
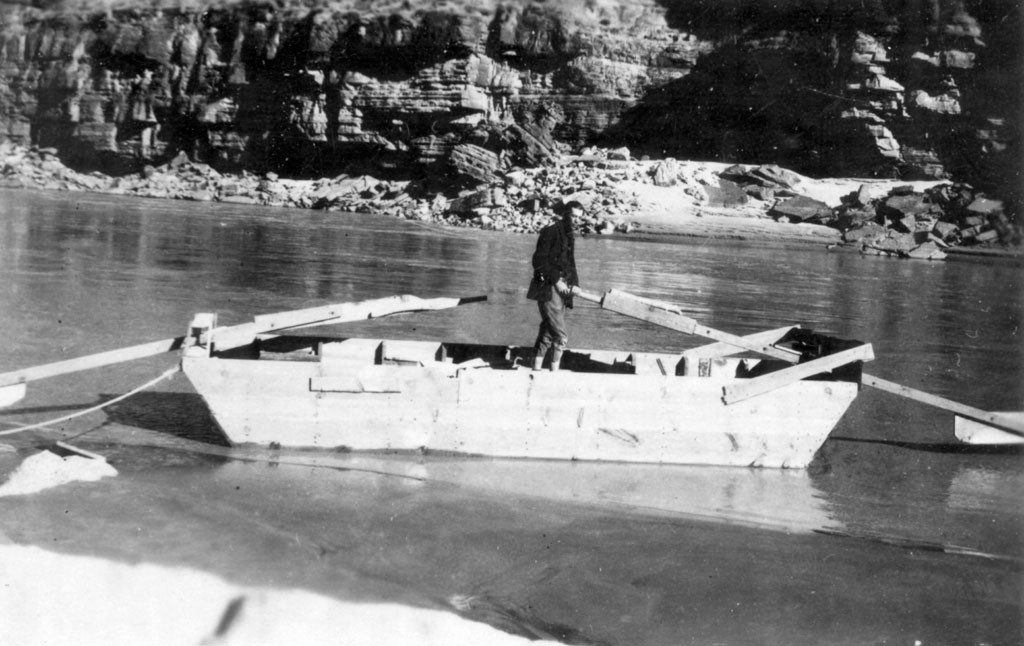
- Glen Hyde in Grand Canyon 1928 Grand Canyon National Park photo
- Born: Glen Rollin Hyde; Bessie Louise Haley; December 9, 1898 (Glen); December 29, 1905 (Bessie); Twin Falls, Idaho, U.S. (Glen); Parkersburg, West Virginia, U.S. (Bessie)
- Disappeared: November 18, 1928; Colorado River
- Known for: Mysterious disappearance

Glen and Bessie Hyde were newlyweds who disappeared while attempting to run the rapids of the Colorado River through the Grand Canyon, Arizona, in 1928. Had the couple succeeded, Bessie Hyde would have been the first woman known to accomplish this feat. Despite lengthy investigation, no conclusive evidence of the Hydes' fate has been discovered.

== Early life ==
Glen Rollin Hyde, born December 9, 1898, was a farmer from Twin Falls, Idaho; Bessie Louise Haley, born December 29, 1905, was a divorcee originally from Parkersburg, West Virginia. The couple first met in 1927 on a passenger ship traveling to Los Angeles and married on April 10, 1928, the day after Bessie's divorce from her first husband was finalized.

== Colorado River trip ==
Glen Hyde had some experience with river running, having traveled the Salmon and Snake Rivers in Idaho with "Cap" Guleke, an experienced river runner, in 1926. Bessie was more of a novice. In October 1928, the Hydes went to Green River, Utah, where Hyde built his own boat, a twenty-foot wooden sweep scow, the type used by river runners of that time in Idaho. The couple set off down the canyons of the Green and Colorado Rivers on October 20, 1928, as a honeymoon adventure trip. Glen wanted to set a new speed record for traveling through the Grand Canyon, while also putting Bessie in the record books as the first documented woman to run the canyon.

== Disappearance ==
They were last seen Sunday, November 18, 1928, when they boated away downriver below Hermit Rapid. The couple had hiked Bright Angel Trail out of the canyon to resupply a few days earlier. At the South Rim, they approached photographer Emery Kolb at his studio and home on the canyon rim, where they were photographed before returning down into the canyon. Some Colorado River historians, such as Otis R. Marston, note that Adolph G. Sutro rode from Phantom Ranch to Hermit Rapid with them in the scow. The Sutro reference regarding riding with the Hydes for one day and possibly being the last to see them is mentioned specifically in the Ken Burns PBS documentary series National Parks: America's Best Idea, and in Marston's book.

=== Search ===
A search was launched by Glen's father, Rollin, even before the couple were to be considered overdue at Needles, California, on December 6, 1928. On December 19, a search plane spotted their scow adrift around river mile 237; it was upright and fully intact, with the supplies still strapped in. A camera recovered from the boat by Emery and Ellsworth Kolb revealed the final photo to have been taken near river mile 165, probably on or about November 27. The search uncovered evidence to indicate the couple made it as far as river mile 226, Diamond Creek, where it is believed they made camp. Bessie noted in her journal that they had cleared 231 Mile Rapid. Historian Otis R. Marston made a compelling case that the couple were most likely swept out of the boat when their scow hit submerged rocks in the heavy rapids near river mile 232. In describing the rapid, Marston noted "...pieces of granite wall lie submerged where they have damaged, snared, or capsized more boats than any other location in the canyon." No trace of the Hydes has ever been found.

=== Theories ===
The romance of the story, coupled with the lack of any conclusive evidence as to the fate of the Hydes, has led to a number of legends and rumors. An elderly woman on a commercial Grand Canyon rafting trip in 1971 announced to other rafters that she was Bessie Hyde, and that she had stabbed her abusive husband to death and escaped the canyon on her own. This account did not match Glen Hyde's known behavior, and the woman recanted her story. There was some speculation after the death of famed rafter Georgie Clark in May 1992 that she was really Bessie Hyde, due to some documents and a pistol found in her effects after her death, but no conclusive evidence for such a link was ever found, not to mention that Clark's early life is well documented.

The skeletal remains of a young male found on the canyon rim in 1933 with a bullet inside the skull were later proven not to be those of Glen Hyde. Suspicion had turned to photographer Emery Kolb, because the remains were discovered on his property, and he was one of the last persons known to have seen the couple alive. However, a later forensic investigation conducted by the University of Arizona concluded that the skeleton belonged to a man no older than 22 and who had died no earlier than 1932, ruling out the possibility that it was the remains of Glen Hyde. In late 2008, a donation of photographs and documents to the Grand Canyon Museum Collection, and an effort by the Coconino County Sheriff's Office to solve the county's cold cases led to the identification of the Kolb skeleton as that of an unidentified suicide victim found in the park in 1933.

== See also ==
- Missing persons
- List of people who disappeared mysteriously: 1910–1990
- Elzada Clover
- Lois Jotter
