= Blue Castle Project =

Planned nuclear power plant located near Green River, Utah

- Country: United States
- Location: 5 miles WNW of Green River, Utah
- Coordinates: 39.013898°N 110.240249°W
- Status: Proposed
- Construction began: 2023 (originally projected) (Note: As of 2019, there's no updates on currently planned start of construction.)
- Commission date: 2028 (originally projected)
- Construction cost: $13.4 billion (projected)
- Owner: Blue Castle Holdings

Nuclear power station
- Reactor supplier: Westinghouse

External links
- Website: bluecastleproject.com

The Blue Castle Project is a proposed nuclear power plant near Green River, Utah, United States. Originally projected for completion in 2030, it would have two 1500 megawatt reactors. It was originally proposed in 2007 by Transition Power Development, which became Blue Castle Holdings (BCH) in 2009. With no updates on the Blue Castle Holdings website since 2019, the project seems to be on hold.

After winning a three-year legal battle over water rights, Blue Castle began reviewing construction companies to work on building the plant. The project is projected to cost up to $20 billion, though BCH projected only $13.4 billion as of January 2017. The plant is expected to produce up to 4000 short term jobs during construction and about 1000 long term jobs in the Green River area.

Public reaction has varied since the project was originally proposed. There are several local and national environmental groups who oppose the project.

== History ==
=== Initial project ===
A project to build a $3-billion nuclear plant in eastern Utah was initially proposed in 2007 by Transition Power Development (TPD). TPD planned to have a minimum of two 1500 megawatt reactors active when the plant went live, though the proposed site could support three reactors. The plant is projected to "increase Utah's electrical capacity by approximately 50 percent". The plant was proposed in part to support a projected 2016 need for power from Rocky Mountain Power, the main supplier of electrical power to the state of Utah. Jon Huntsman Jr., the governor of Utah at that time, stated that he was opposed to any plan for a plant that did not include onsite spent fuel reprocessing. At the time of the proposal, TPD had obtained rights to about half of the water needed to run the proposed two reactors.

As part of the process, TPD started the process to lease 30,000 acre-feet (37 million cubic meters) from the Kane County Water Conservancy District in 2009 to supply some of the water needed for operating the plant. The project is projected to require about 55,000 acre⋅ft (68 million m^{3}) of water to operate the proposed two reactors. Officials from Utah and TPD met in 2009 with both Secretary of Energy Steven Chu and Secretary of the Interior Ken Salazar regarding the fast-tracking of new nuclear programs in the western United States.

TPD became Blue Castle Holdings on September 28, 2009. About a week later, Blue Castle signed an agreement with Page Electric Utility (PEU)—an electrical utility company in Page, Arizona—detailing how PEU could become an equity owner in the proposed plant. BCH stated they had unanimous support for the plant from the Emery County Commission and the leadership of Green River, Utah in 2010.

In October 2011, BCH met with members of the Nuclear Regulatory Commission and local Utah agencies in hearings regarding site surveys, emergency planning, and environmental concerns regarding the placement of the proposed plant near the Green River. The company was also waiting for approval on applications to lease the 53,500 acre⋅ft (66 million m^{3}) of water needed to operate the plant.

After a review period of more than two years, the water rights transfer was approved by an engineer working for the state of Utah. That decision was immediately challenged by a series of lawsuits. After hearing testimony in September 2013, a 7th District Court judge upheld the decision of the state engineer. The decision was appealed, but the appeals court upheld the decision of the 7th District Court judge in July 2016, stating the arguments by the plaintiffs were "often inadequately supported and briefed".

In 2017 BCH stated the licensing phase will go from 2017 to 2020. Following the bankruptcy of Westinghouse Electric Company, the manufacturer of the planned AP1000 reactors, in March 2017, the Blue Castle CEO said their plans were unaffected and "We’re going to wait and see who buys Westinghouse ... They’re not going to go away as a company." There have been no new announcements or updates on their website since 2019.

=== Projected cost ===
The initial projected cost given by Blue Castle (operating then as Transition Power Development) was $3 billion. By 2010, the cost of building the plant was estimated at $13–16 billion, which climbed to $18–20 billion by the end of 2016. BCH gave an estimated cost figure of $13.4 billion during a webinar in January 2017.

=== Site preparation ===
The site is located about 5 miles (8.0 km) west-northwest of Green River, Emery County, Utah. A geological study was completed on the proposed site which included ten 600 feet (180 m) boreholes which were then studied using optical and acoustic methods. These results were reviewed by the Nuclear Regulatory Commission, who stated that "the geotechnical activities were adequately controlled with an appropriate level of quality assurance and no issues were identified". Hydrological studies were done using 18 boreholes from 30–150 feet (9.1–45.7 m) in depth, and the data was being analyzed as of February 2016. Meteorological studies included two years of data collection.

BCH plans to store spent fuel rods onsite for at least 100 years.

=== Contracting and construction ===
Westinghouse will be producing the nuclear reactors for the power plant. In November 2016, BCH began looking for contractors to build the facilities.

BCH stated they plan to begin construction in 2023, have the first reactor online in 2028, and the second reactor online in 2030.

However, with no updates on the Blue Castle Holdings website since 2019, the project seems to be on hold and no new construction start date has been released.

== Economic impact ==
BCH projects about $500 million annually in revenue and state and local taxes paid. A 2010 opinion piece in the Daily Herald suggested the plant would bring over 2000 short term jobs and 1000 high-paying long term jobs to the area. In the January 2017 webinar, BCH stated there could be up to 4000 short term jobs and "800-1,000 people in long term good jobs" such as electricians and engineers.

Howard Sierer suggested. in a January 2022 opinion piece for The Independent in St. George, that many of the workers in the coal mining industry could be transitioned to working at the Green River nuclear plant as a way to maintain support for local businesses and governments in the area.

== Public reaction ==
Public support in Utah for nuclear power around the time of the initial proposal was generally positive. A November 2007 editorial in the Provo Daily Herald newspaper stated 43 percent of polled Utahns supported the building of more nuclear power plants, and another poll conducted in February 2008 showed 57 percent in favor.

Utah Senator Bob Bennett stated in late 2008 that "if we are going to be serious about carbon emissions, we have to have a much larger nuclear component in our electric production" in November 2008. Gary Kofford, the county commissioner for Emery County in 2008, stated that talk of building a nuclear plant near Green River was just speculation after TPD had been searching for a site for over a year. An editorial in nearby Grand Junction, Colorado expressed tentative support for the project, especially in light of coal and gas plants being shut down despite growing energy demands. The Utah State Legislature approved a joint resolution endorsing nuclear power as a viable option in March 2009.

When TPD started the process to lease water from the Kane County Water Conservancy District, the Healthy Environment Alliance of Utah—an environmental advocacy group—indicated it may fight the lease. A 2010 opinion piece in the Daily Herald stated that the trade off was acceptable between using about one percent of the water flowing in the Green River through Emery County every year, and bringing over 2000 short term jobs and 1000 high-paying long term jobs to the area. Governor Gary Herbert expressed interest in letting "free enterprise...make Utah a net energy exporter" by using the technological power of Utah State University, the University of Utah, and Brigham Young University help those private businesses "create cleaner, cheaper sources of energy".

During legislative hearings in February 2011, concern was expressed by citizens and the U.S. Fish and Wildlife Service regarding the water leased by BCH for the plant. They stated that it could negatively impact downstream people and wildlife. Governor Herbert released a 10-year energy plan the following month that included options for nuclear power in Utah. A poll conducted shortly before the release of that plan showed a majority of those polled opposed locating a nuclear power plant in Utah.

A forum hosted by the Sutherland Institute in July 2011 said that Utah was already burning coal and natural gas to provide power to California, and that nuclear power generation would be beneficial in reducing those carbon emissions. Members of the forum also expressed the opinion that cost concerns were "not grounded in any factual basis" due to the length of time since the last nuclear power plants were constructed. Several Utah environmental groups, businesses, and individuals launched multiple lawsuits in March 2012 to challenge the proposed leasing of the water rights due to a perceived lack of scrutiny of the proposed Blue Castle project. The lawsuits were eventually dismissed after appeal.

A 2013 letter from atmospheric scientist Ken Caldeira, professor of meteorology Kerry Emanuel, and climate scientists Tom Wigley and James Hansen encouraged environmental groups to support nuclear power reactors as a way to address environmental concerns such as climate change and pollution. HEAL Utah dismissed the letter, stating the scientists should be trying to persuade "utility executives and the president of the United States".

In November 2016, HEAL Utah and other environmental groups filed complaints with the State of Utah claiming BCH had not made the contractually-required initial payments for the approved water rights. BCH stated it was renegotiating with the two water conservancy districts because the agreements "[needed] to be changed to reflect changed market conditions" because of delays caused by the three years of legal battles.

== Blue Castle Holdings ==
Blue Castle Holdings (BCH) is the company that owns the Blue Castle project. It was cofounded in 2006 by Aaron Tilton. Other executives include Thomas Retson (formerly of GE Nuclear Energy), Nils Diaz (formerly head of the U.S. Nuclear Regulatory Commission), Robert Graber, and Reed Searle. BCH started a new subsidiary, Power Block Coin, in November 2017. It will provide power to data centers that support mining of cryptocurrency.

== See also ==
- TRIGA reactor at the University of Utah
