= Georgie White =

Grand Canyon river running guide (1911–1992)

Georgie White Clark (1911–1992) was a river-running guide in the Grand Canyon. She was the first woman to run the Grand Canyon as a commercial enterprise, and she introduced several innovations and adjustments to the way that guides ran the Colorado River. In particular, she used large army-surplus rafts, often lashing together multiple rafts, to maintain stability in the large rapids. In 2001, the United States Board on Geographic Names renamed Mile 24 Rapid in her honor.

== Early years ==
Born Bessie DeRoss in Oklahoma, she was raised in Denver, Colorado, from the age of nine. She married Harold Clark while still in high school and had a daughter, Sommona Rose, at the age of 17. She moved to Chicago for several years, then to New York City with her husband, finding office work at Radio City Music Hall, and divorced him not long after a cross-country bicycle trip in 1936. She was briefly married to James White.

== The West and the Grand Canyon ==
Georgie and her daughter were close companions after her divorce from Clark, engaging in outdoor activities such as mountain and rock climbing, skiing, skating, and bicycling. In 1944, her 15-year-old daughter was killed by a hit-and-run driver while bicycling. Her "Royal River Rats" achieved some fame, being featured in Life Magazine, The Tonight Show Starring Johnny Carson, and countless newspapers. At the age of 73, she could be seen holding her motor rig's tiller with one hand and a beer with the other, wearing a full-length leopard-pattern leotard.

Following her death, those who examined her personal effects found artifacts which led some to speculate that White had, in fact, been Bessie Hyde, the woman who had vanished with her husband during a honeymoon float of the Grand Canyon in 1928. Rumors had floated that Bessie had killed her abusive husband and hiked out of the Canyon. Among White's personal effects were a copy of the Hydes' marriage license and a pistol in her lingerie drawer. However, river historian Brad Dimock and White's biographer Richard Westwood have discounted the rumor that White and Hyde were the same person.

The renaming of Mile 24 Rapid in her honor was controversial. Georgie's detractors were many; in addition, her friends would have liked to see a bigger, more prominent rapid named for her. Rapids such as Crystal and Granite were unlikely to be renamed, and on October 11, 2001, the U.S. Board on Geographic Names followed the Arizona State Boards on Geographic and Historic Names and approved renaming Twenty-Four Mile Rapid as Georgie Rapid in a split 3–2 vote.

Georgie was often criticized for her habit of disregarding customer safety. Her business had several dubious distinctions: the first rafting commercial fatality, Mae Hansen, aged 64, in July 1972; and the first injured person to be evacuated by helicopter from the Grand Canyon, Vernon Read, who suffered severe skull and spinal fractures on a trip in 1959. On August 25, 1984, river guide John Davenport watched as Georgie intentionally launched her boat into a dangerous position into Lava Falls Rapid (River Mile 179.4), and later reported she recklessly piloted her boat in "the worst example of gross incompetence I have ever seen.
