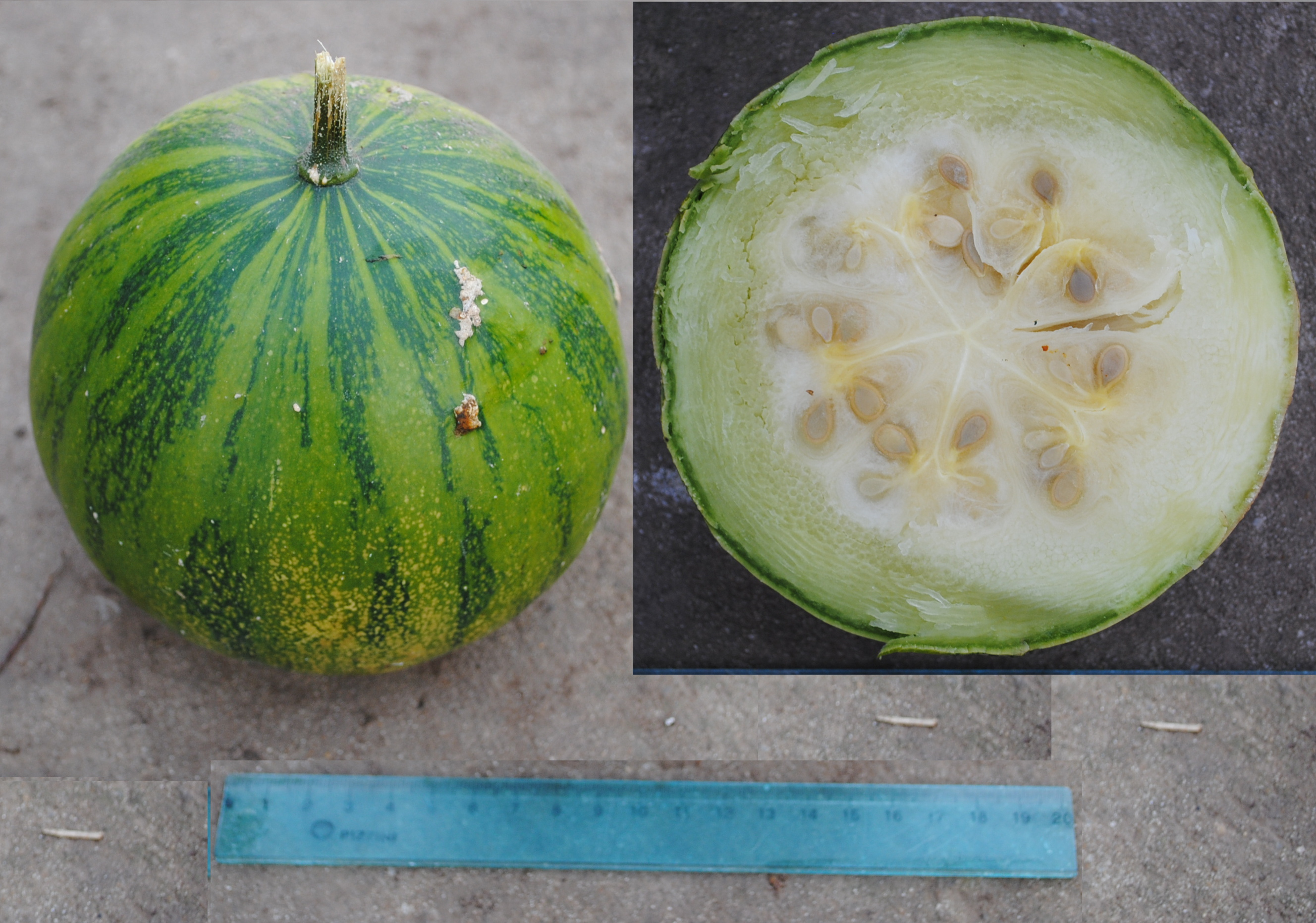
- Mature fruit and cut showing pulp and seeds.

Conservation status
- Vulnerable (IUCN 3.1)

Scientific classification
- Kingdom: Plantae
- Clade: Tracheophytes
- Clade: Angiosperms
- Clade: Eudicots
- Clade: Rosids
- Order: Cucurbitales
- Family: Cucurbitaceae
- Genus: Cucurbita
- Species: C. ecuadorensis

Binomial name
- Cucurbita ecuadorensis H.C.Cutler & Whitaker

= Cucurbita ecuadorensis =

Species of flowering plant

Cucurbita ecuadorensis is a species of squash, described in 1965 as growing wild in Ecuador. Like most wild gourds and squashes, it is a creeping vine and is often found climbing over other vegetation. It has been found only in the western provinces of Guayas and Manabí. There is evidence that it was domesticated in Ecuador around 10,000 years ago, likely for its seeds, but no direct records exist and it is no longer cultivated. It is resistant to many diseases of cultivated Cucurbita species, and has been used to breed resistance to several diseases into common squashes. For example, researchers at Cornell University used Cucurbita ecuadorensis to breed resistance to papaya ringspot virus, watermelon mosaic virus, and powdery mildew, into common Cucurbita maxima cultivars. Cucurbita ecuadorensis is listed on the IUCN Red List as vulnerable and is found protected in the Machalilla National Park.
