= William H. Marston =

Captain William Harrington Marston (1835–1926) was an early resident of Berkeley, California. He served as President of the Town Board of Trustees from 1899 to 1903.

Captain Marston was born in Cutler, Maine, in November 1835, and orphaned at age 9. He was eventually taken in by the Plummer family. Mr. Plummer was a seaman, and Marston decided at age 17 to follow in his footsteps. He started as a cabin boy, and worked himself up to first mate by 1859. In 1860, the Plummers decided to move to California, and Marston went with them, arriving in San Francisco in May 1860. Upon his arrival, he was made a captain and hired out to sea. His initial voyages were in the coastal lumber trade which stretched from California to Puget Sound in Washington. Later voyages took him to destinations throughout the Pacific, from Alaska, to Hawaii, Tahiti, China, Australia and New Zealand.

Captain Marston brought the first load of Hawaiian sugar into the United States at San Francisco in September 1876 under the 1875 Treaty of Reciprocity between the U.S. and the Kingdom of Hawaii.

In 1884, Captain Marston married Idela Reed in San Francisco. She too was a native of Maine, born in 1862. She grew up in Lawrence, Massachusetts and moved with her family to Hawaii in 1880. Idela came to San Francisco in June 1882 to take her teaching exam, and began working at schools in Shasta County and Mendocino County. Upon marriage, she sailed with Captain Marston, and learned how to navigate. The Marstons had six children: Sibyl (b. 1885), Ellery (b. 1886), Elsa (b. 1892), Otis (b. 1894), Vera (b. 1895), and Merle (b. 1903). Ellery died in 1888. When they were not at sea, the Marstons lived in various rooming houses in San Francisco. In May 1893, they moved into their own house in Berkeley located at the corner of Vine and Arch Streets.

At the close of the 19th century, Captain Marston became the president of the Shipowners Association of San Francisco. He also served on the Board of Directors of Welch and Company, ("Planters Line"), a shipping company eventually acquired by Matson Lines. He was also a director of the Mercantile Trust Company, the First National Bank of Berkeley, and Boole and Sons Shipyards in Alameda, California.

During his tenure as President of the Board of Trustees of the Town of Berkeley, Marston led the effort to purchase the site of the new town hall.

Mrs. Marston was active in Berkeley civic affairs. She was secretary of the city's Playground Commission, and helped establish city recreation centers as well as city summer camps outside the city proper. She helped found the Berkeley League of Women Voters, and was active in the Berkeley Women's City Club and the Hillside Club.

Captain Marston died of a stroke on April 10, 1926. His wife Idela, who was considerably younger than he, died almost exactly 30 years later on April 11, 1956, also of a stroke.
