= Otis R. Marston =

American river runner (1894–1979)

Otis Reed Marston
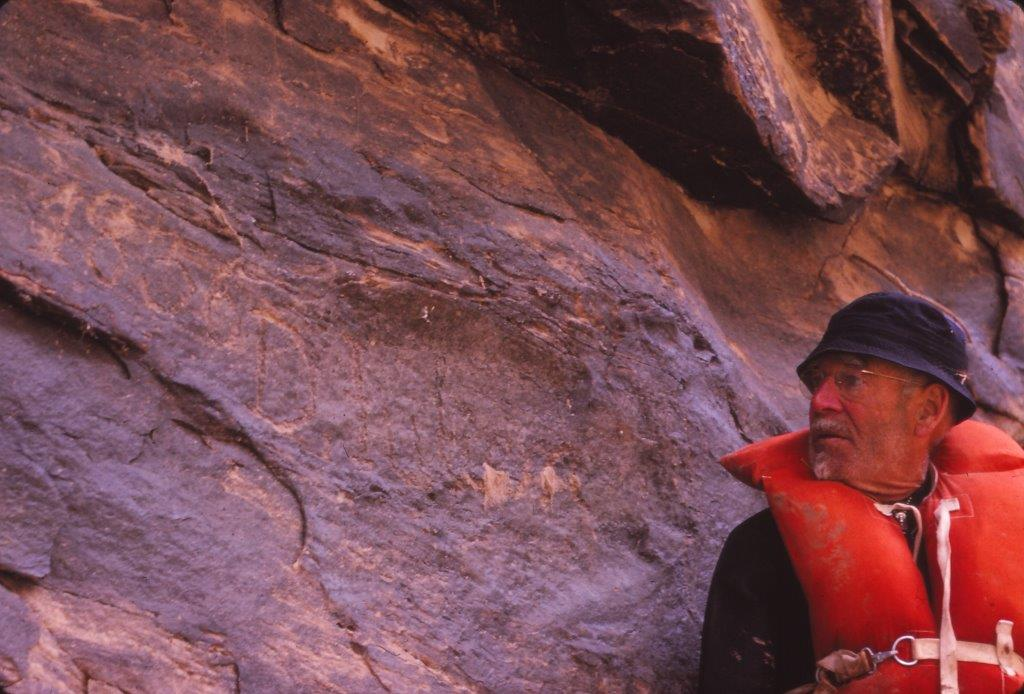
- Otis "Dock" Marston at 1836 Denis Julien inscription in Cataract Canyon, April 1964 (Photo: Jorgen Visbak)
- Born: February 11, 1894; Berkeley, California
- Died: August 30, 1979 (aged 85); San Francisco, California
- Other name: Dock
- Occupations: River runner, historian, author
- Spouse: Margaret “Mag” Lowell Garthwaite

Otis Reed "Dock" Marston (February 11, 1894 – August 30, 1979) was an American writer, historian and Grand Canyon river runner who participated in a large number of river-running firsts. Marston was the eighty-third person to successfully complete the water transit of the Grand Canyon. He spent the last thirty years of his life writing his magnum opus on the history of the first 100 Grand Canyon river runners. In researching his book, he amassed a vast collection of material on early river runners in the American Southwest, especially runners of the Green and Colorado Rivers. His collection is housed in the Huntington Library in San Marino, California.

== Early life ==
=== Family ===
Otis Reed Marston's father, Captain William Harrington Marston, was orphaned in northern Maine at the age of nine. William went to sea out of Boston in his teens where he became a master mariner and eventually owned a large shipping business sailing the Pacific out of San Francisco. The forty-eight-year-old captain met twenty-one-year-old Idela Alice Reed while sailing one of his ships from Hawaii to California in 1883. The couple was married the next year. Idela gave birth to her first child, Sibyl, in 1885, followed by her first son, Ellery William, in 1886. Tragically, Ellery choked to death while the family was at sea in late 1888 and he was buried there. Idela gave birth to four more children: Elsa, Merle, Vera and another son, Otis Reed.

=== University studies and early career ===
Young Otis was a strong swimmer. He swam across the Golden Gate strait from San Francisco to Marin County in 1915. He received a bachelor's degree in electrical engineering from the University of California at Berkeley in 1916, then went on to receive his master's degree in industrial engineering at Cornell University in 1917.

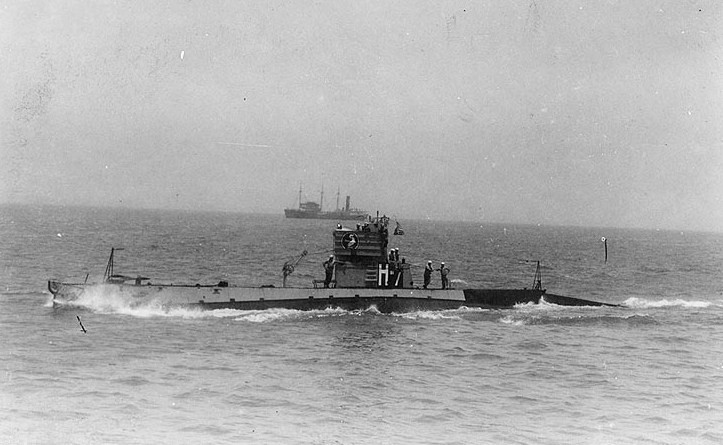
NH-53610 USS H-7 underway, circa 1922

Otis joined the United States Navy and received training at the United States Naval Academy where he graduated as an ensign in 1918. While on leave on Christmas Eve 1918, Otis rode a mule to Hermit Camp in the Grand Canyon, and saw Hermit Rapid on Christmas Day. By the close of 1919, he had completed his qualifications as a submarine commander with the Navy on the USS H-7 (SS-150).

=== Marriage and children ===
Otis met Margaret “Mag” Lowell Garthwaite and the two were married on January 4, 1925. They had three children, a son named Otis Garthwaite “Garth” and twin girls, Loel and Maradel. In later years, Mag became a prime mover in the University of California Alumni Association and Berkeley's Young People's Symphony Orchestra program. Mag is also credited with initiating the use of policewomen on the Berkeley force.

Marston began working as a financial planner for E. F. Hutton around 1930, and he soon realized he was better at his job if he understood the psychological make-up of his clients. To this end, he read a number of books on psychology. The work with Hutton was terminated in 1947.

== River running ==
Marston made a total of twenty-two river trips through the Grand Canyon. The following is a recounting of some of those river trips. It is not a complete list.

=== 1942 Grand Canyon ===
A friend of Marston's, Neill C. Wilson, participated in a San Juan River trip with Norman Nevills and thought it would be great to go with Norm on a Grand Canyon cruise. Otis joined Wilson and the two men, accompanied by their sons, cruised the Grand Canyon with Nevills in 1942. By the end of the trip, Otis had grown a bushy beard making him look like an "old time pill-roller" or "Doc". The name stuck, and a few years later Otis changed it to Dock, as in the dock at the end of the trip.

=== 1944 Glen Canyon ===
In 1944, Marston and his two daughters joined Nevills for a run from Mexican Hat, Utah, through Glen Canyon to Lee's Ferry. Dock rowed a punt some on that trip, including through Syncline Rapid.

=== 1945 Cataract Canyon, Salmon and Hell's Canyon of the Snake River ===
In 1945, Marston rowed a boat on the Colorado River from Moab, Utah to Lee’s Ferry, through Cataract and Glen canyons with Nevills; in 1946, Marston and Nevills rowed Idaho’s Salmon River and Hells Canyon.

=== 1947 Lodore and Grand Canyon ===
Marston rowed a boat for Norm through Lodore and Grand canyons in 1947. On that trip, Dock and Garth were the first father-son team to each row a boat on the same trip through the Grand Canyon. Dock swam Dubendorff Rapid without a life jacket or air mattress. It was the first record of anyone intentionally swimming a Grand Canyon rapid free of any flotation device.

=== 1948 Grand Canyon and Dolores River ===
In 1948, Dock rowed the Grand Canyon on his last river trip with Norm Nevills before Nevills' untimely death in 1949. He also ran the Dolores River with his wife Mag, making the first complete transit of the Dolores River with Robert Preston Walker of the Grand Junction Daily Sentinel.

=== 1949 first motorboat run of Grand Canyon ===
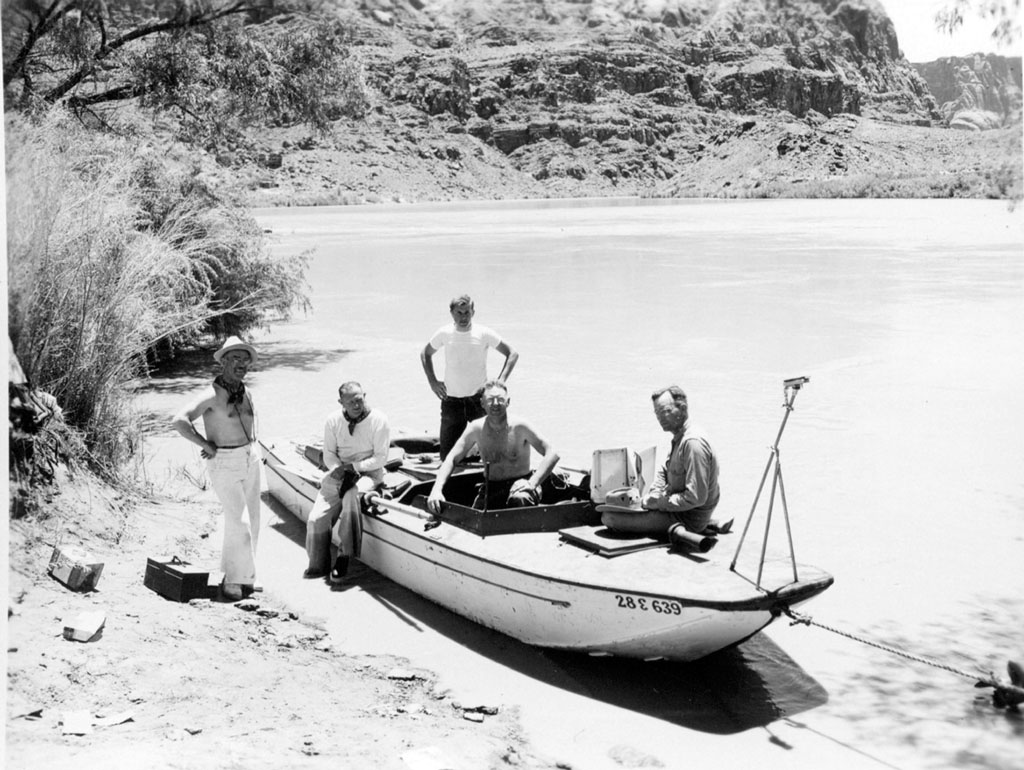
1949 and 1950 Esmeralda II

Dock’s next first was his run of the Grand Canyon in the first motorized boat, the Esmeralda II, with Egbert "Ed" Hudson in 1949. Hudson had built the boat to design specifications provided by Canadian Naval Architect William Garden. Hudson did the driving while Dock did the navigating. Other members in the Esmeralda II included Hudson's son Edward, Wilson "Willie" Taylor, and Bestor Robinson.

=== 1950 first stock motorboat run of Grand Canyon ===
Dock was back to run the Grand Canyon again with two motorboats in 1950, with Ed Hudson piloting the Esmeralda II and Dock piloting a stock Chris-Craft Speedster. The Esmeralda II broke down and was abandoned by Hudson. In the first helicopter rescue of river runners in the Grand Canyon, Hudson and his son Edward were helicoptered out of the canyon while Dock completed the cruise in the Chris-Craft. The next river trip in Grand Canyon, almost a month later, discovered the Esmeralda II, fixed her, and were able to motor her through the rest of the Canyon. Hudson donated the Esmeralda II to the National Park Service where the boat is preserved to this day. Just after completing the 1950 cruise, Dock and Mag joined Moulton Fulmer for a dory run of the Yampa River.

=== 1951 first outboard motorboat run of Grand Canyon ===
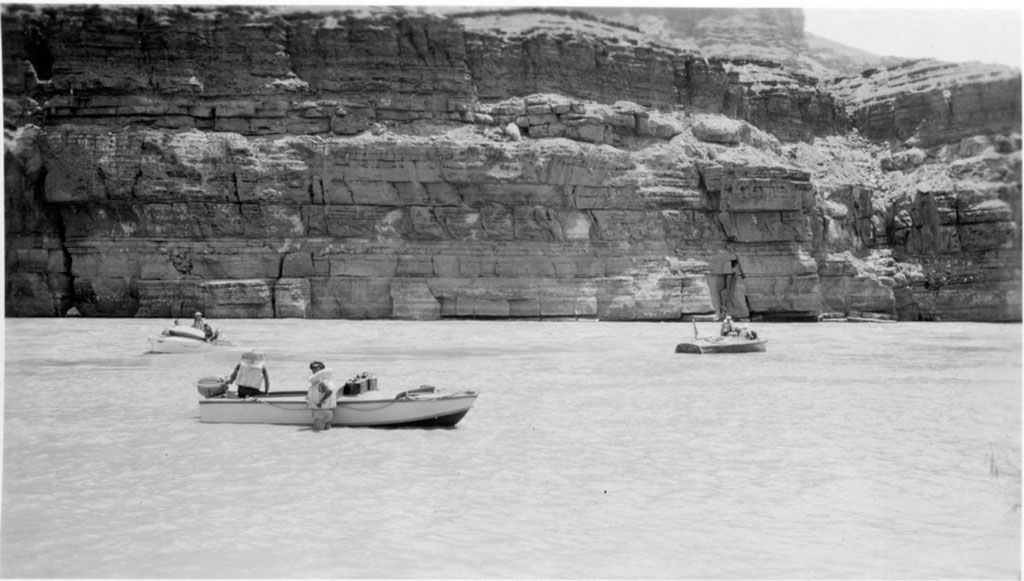
First outboard down-run of Grand Canyon, at Lee's Ferry, Arizona, 1951

Dock next turned to the question of outboard motors. In 1951, he orchestrated the first successful down-run of outboard motorboats through the entire Grand Canyon. The 1951 "Marston Motorcade" consisted of two outboard motorboats and three stock Chris-Craft Speedsters. The 18-foot aluminum hull outboard motorboat June Bug was piloted by Jimmy Jordan and the second boat of the same design, the Twin, was piloted by Rod Sanderson. The two outboards were powered by twin 25-horsepower Evinrude outboard motors. While the June Bug completed the cruise, not far below Separation Canyon, the gearshift on the motor of the Twin gave trouble, and the boat was taken in tow, much to the disgust of its crew.

=== 1953 and 1954 all-outboard trips ===
In June 1953, Dock and his wife Mag did a Grand Canyon river trip to do some reconnaissance for a possible Walt Disney film. They used three single-engine outboard boats, including the Twin, one of the original outboards used in 1951. Dock put together another all-outboard three-boat trip in 1954. Low water caused numerous rock vs. boat encounters.

=== 1957 high-water Grand Canyon run, 1958 run and 1959 Disney Film ===
Dock kept running rivers, and in 1957 ran the Grand Canyon on 126,000 cubic feet per second (3,600 m^{3}/s), the highest Colorado River flow ever navigated. In 1958, Dock led a three motorboat group through Grand Canyon. Renowned artist Mary Ogden Abbott was on that trip. Hired by Walt Disney Studios in 1959 as a technical adviser, Dock lead a film crew through the Grand Canyon to film river running and background scenes for a perfectly horrible movie about Powell’s first transit called Ten Who Dared. The film critics wished the men hadn’t.

=== 1960 first and only jetboat up-run of Grand Canyon ===
Using his vast river knowledge and ability to get a river-running permit, in 1960 Dock teamed up with New Zealander Jon Hamilton, son of Bill Hamilton, and others for the first and only successful up-run of the Colorado River through the Grand Canyon using jetboats.

=== 1963 first Sportyak II Grand Canyon down-run ===
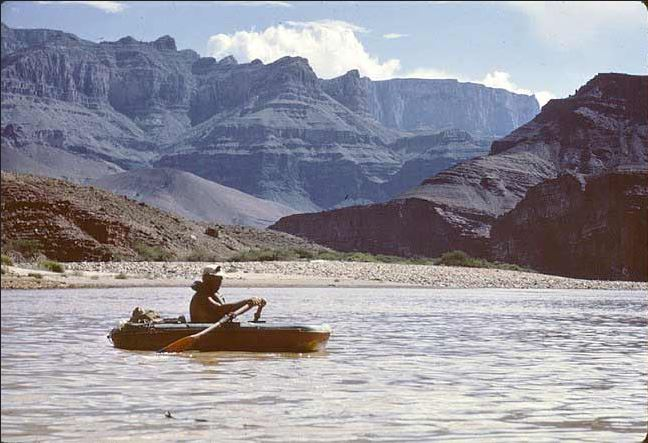
1963 Sportyak II low-water cruise

In January 1963, the newly completed Glen Canyon Dam began impounding water. That August, with the dam releasing water at about 1,000 cubic feet per second (28 m^{3}/s), Dock and others cruised the entire Colorado River in Marble Canyon and the Grand Canyon, just downstream of Glen Canyon Dam. It was monsoon season, and the side tributaries, especially the Paria River, were adding liquid mud into the almost empty river channel. The river runners used small Sportyak II watercraft, and walked around a number of rapids they had never experienced at higher water flows. This river journey was the first river trip through Grand Canyon after the closing of the bypass tubes around Glen Canyon Dam.

=== 1964 Denis Julien inscription ===
While researching material for the manuscript (see below) about the 1889–90 Robert Brewster Stanton railroad survey, Dock realized an inscription made by fur trapper Denis Julien in 1836 had not been seen by river runners since the late 1800s. The Stanton Party found the inscription in lower Cataract Canyon in June 1889. It was seen again in the summer of 1891 by the Best Expedition, then went unnoticed. In late March 1964, as the reservoir was filling behind Glen Canyon Dam, Dock and three friends, Jorgen Visbak, Bill Belknap and Bill's son Buzz, used Sportyaks to slowly cruise through Cataract Canyon from the Confluence to Hite, Utah. Along the way, they rediscovered the 1836 inscription made by Denis Julien. Not long after Dock and his friends located it, the reservoir waters rising behind Glen Canyon Dam submerged the inscription.

== River historian ==
Marston began to write a simple book on Grand Canyon river running history in 1947. He assumed it would take six months to a year, at which time he would return to financial planning. But the more he worked on the book, the more he realized what had been written was woefully inaccurate.

By 1949, Dock was interviewing river runners and searching out original letters, logs, photographs and journals. Marston would eventually amass an unparalleled collection of anything and everything to do with the history of the people who boated any part of the Colorado River watershed. This extensive collection was eventually contained in 492 boxes, 60 albums, 163 reels of film, and 38 video cassettes and was the basis for Marston's manuscript on the first 100 river runners through the Grand Canyon.

By 1953, Dock had already spent five years trying to sort out river-running history fact from fiction, and he was well underway writing his definitive account of Grand Canyon river-running. Dock had some help in his writing at this time from an elderly neighbor who had recently moved to Berkeley. The neighbor was Thaddeus Ames, a psychoanalyst at the top of his field, who had studied under Carl Jung and Sigmund Freud. The two men became great friends and spent hours on hours trying to understand the actions of the river people Dock was writing about. They also analyzed the biographers who had written accounts about people like John Wesley Powell, Glen and Bessie Hyde, Buzz Holmstrom, Bert Loper, and Norm Nevills, accounts that were often full of the good things done but left out all the bad things. Early on, Dock decided his work would not be one-sided. Besides chronicling river history, by this time Dock had completed a list of what he called the first 200 river runners to complete a fast-water transit of the Colorado River from Lee’s Ferry to the Grand Wash Cliffs.

== Later life ==
Besides his river work, Marston participated in many civic works, including Rotary International. He was also a member of the Bohemian Club. The death of his mother Idela in 1956, an amazing woman in her own right, the completion of Glen Canyon Dam in 1963, and the loss of his wife of forty-four years to cancer in 1968 were difficult blows. In 1973, Marston moved into an apartment at the Bohemian Club, and rented an adjacent apartment to house his huge collection of Colorado River material. Dock continued to work on his book before he died August 30, 1979, at the age of 85.

Marston's manuscript was not published for more than 30 years afterward, finally going to press in 2014 as From Powell to Power: A Recounting of the First One Hundred River Runners Through the Grand Canyon.
