= Buzz Holmstrom =

American river runner (1909–1946)

Haldane "Buzz" Holmstrom (1909–1946) was a pioneer of running the Colorado River through the Grand Canyon. He was the first person to float all the way from Green River, Wyoming to Boulder Dam solo. He built his own rowboats, often of his own design, to run whitewater rivers.

Born on May 10, 1909, in southern Oregon, he was raised in Coquille, Oregon. Buzz's father worked as a logger and died when Buzz was twenty. As a young man, he worked in a filling station. He began building his flat-bottomed boats in 1934, running the Rogue River in southwest Oregon. He ran the Rogue again in 1935 and the Main Salmon in Idaho in 1936. On October 25, 1937, he began his most famous feat, his solo run of the Colorado from Green River, Wyoming, down through Cataract Canyon, Glen Canyon, and the Grand Canyon. At the end of his run through the Grand Canyon, the motorboats refused to give him a tow across Lake Mead, so he rowed the distance in four and a half days. Symbolically, he touched the newly built Boulder Dam with his boat at the end of his journey on November 20. However, Colorado River historian Otis "Dock" Marston wrote that he actually went to the base of the dam at the end of his following trip. The second trip in 1938 included Amos Burg and Willis Johnson. This trip was captured in Burg's short movie, Conquering the Colorado. Buzz received no financial gain from the film.

Despite the ground-breaking nature of Holmstrom's feat, his river-running was characterized not by bravado, but by humility and awe at his surroundings.

When the United States entered World War II, Holmstrom enlisted in the Navy, where he served in the European Theater and Kiriwina Island in the South Pacific. Upon his discharge in 1945, he went back to work for the Bureau of Reclamation, where he had worked for two years prior to the war.

Holmstrom died of a gunshot wound to the head on May 18, 1946, on the second day of a surveying trip for the United States Coast and Geodetic Survey. His body was discovered on a game trail downriver of Rondowa, the confluence of the Wallowa River and the Grande Ronde River. The motivation for his apparent suicide is not known.

== Further resources ==
- Vince Welch, Cort Conley, and Brad Dimock (2004). The Doing of the Thing: The Brief, Brilliant Whitewater Career of Buzz Holmstrom. Fretwater Press. ISBN 1-892327-07-4.
- Briggs, Don (1999). River Runners of the Grand Canyon, VHS/DVD.
- Northern Arizona University, Cline Library Digital Archives, Diary of Buzz Holmstrom's trip down the Colorado. Oct. 4 to Nov. 20, 1937.
- Marston, Otis R., (2014). From Powell To Power; A Recounting of the First One Hundred River Runners Through the Grand Canyon. Flagstaff, Arizona: Vishnu Temple Press. ISBN 978-0990527022
