= Norman Nevills =

American businessman (1908–1949)

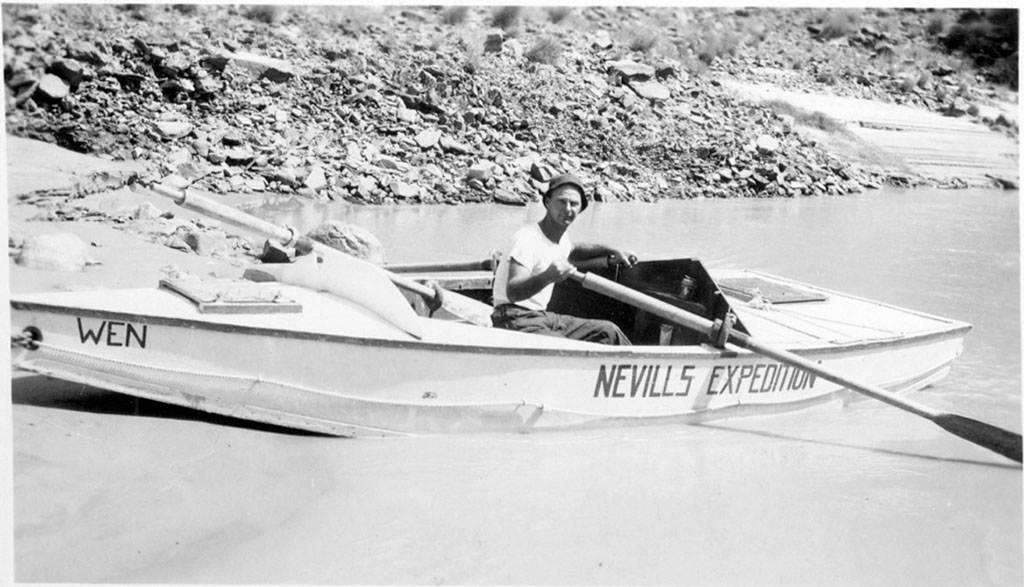
Norm at Bright Angel Beach 1947

Norman D. Nevills (April 9, 1908 – September 19, 1949) was a pioneer of commercial river-running in the American Southwest, particularly the Colorado River through the Grand Canyon. He led trips including Dr. Elzada Clover and Lois Jotter, the first two women to successfully float the Grand Canyon (which occurred in 1938), and Barry Goldwater.

== Personal life ==
Nevills was the son of William E. and Mae Davies Nevills of California. The elder Nevills left California in 1921 to pursue a career in oil drilling in the San Juan oil fields of southern Utah. Norman and his mother moved to Mexican Hat, Utah to join his father in 1927 after two years of college at the College of the Pacific in Stockton, California. William E. Nevills had some experience running whitewater on the Yukon River during the Klondike gold rush, and the younger Nevills adopted his father's interest in running rivers. Norman became interested in running rivers, floating the San Juan River in an open boat in 1932, carrying supplies to a miner downriver from Mexican Hat. The next year, he worked for a while for the Rainbow Bridge/Monument Valley expedition, including using their Wilson Fold-Flat boats on the river.

Nevills met Doris Drown in July, 1933; they married in October of that year. For their honeymoon, they floated the San Juan in a boat that he had built from his mother's horse trough. They had two daughters, Joan (Staveley), born October 7, 1936, and Sandra (Reiff), born March 28, 1941.

== River trips ==
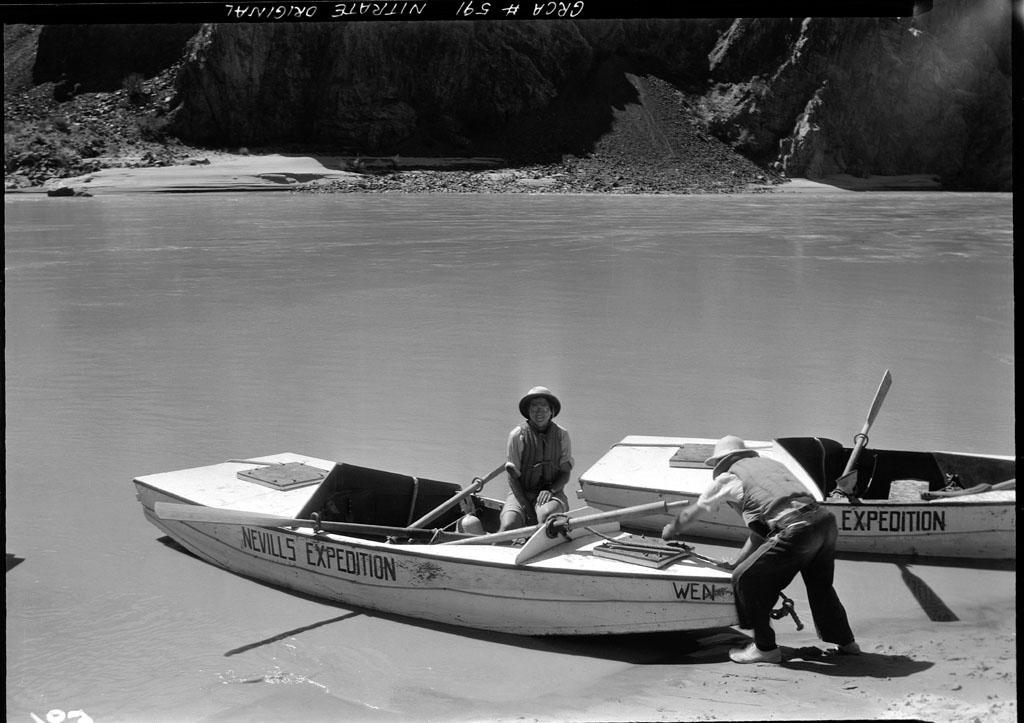
Dr. Elzada Clover at Bright Angel Creek in Grand Canyon, July 1938

Although most of Nevills' river trips were on the San Juan, he ran seven trips through the Grand Canyon: 1938, 1940, 1941, 1942, 1947, 1948, and 1949. Nevills' chance for fame came in 1938, when he had the opportunity to escort Dr. Elzada Clover and Lois Jotter, two botanists from the University of Michigan who wished to catalog the flora of the Grand Canyon, from Green River, Utah, to Lake Mead. They encountered extraordinarily high water at the confluence of the San Juan and the Colorado, but finished the trip without serious incident. Their 43-day, 666-mile trip generated a lot of publicity for Nevills. At least one river historian, Otis "Dock" Marston, in reviewing all the journals after the trip, noted that the success of the cruise was due in large part to Dr. Clover's insistence new boatmen be found to replace the two that quit at Lee's Ferry.

In 1940, Nevills took Barry Goldwater, a young man from a family which owned Arizona's largest chain of grocery stores, as a paying customer down the Grand Canyon. Nevills allowed Goldwater to take the oars, and Goldwater flipped the boat in one rapid. Following his trip, Goldwater began giving slide shows in movie theaters and other venues, often to sold-out crowds. His statewide barnstorming tour convinced Goldwater that he had a knack for public speaking—which he parlayed into his very successful career in politics.

Successful trips down the Grand Canyon followed in 1941 and 1942. The 1942 Grand Canyon trip included passengers Ed Hudson, Ed Olsen and Otis Marston. On that cruise boatman Wayne McConkie flipped a boat in Lava Chuar Rapid. Olsen made the film Facing Your Danger after the trip, which won the Academy Award for short subjects in 1947. Marston would proceed to travel more river miles with Norm than any other of Norm's boatman. Restrictions on travel caused by World War II ended Norm's Grand Canyon trips for the duration. Nevills stayed in Mexican Hat throughout the war, leading an occasional river trip, including some on the San Juan river and one on the Colorado through Cataract Canyon. In 1946, challenged by a Salt Lake City newspaper writer, Nevills went to Idaho to run trips on the Main Salmon and the Snake Rivers. These were very successful and Nevills considered expanding his business to include these rivers, but that never came about. He ran the upper Green River in 1947, as well as the Grand Canyon; then ran only the San Juan and Grand Canyon in 1948. In 1949, his last season on the river, he ran the Grand Canyon, finishing the trip in August.

In ten years of leading paying customers down the Colorado, San Juan, and Green Rivers, Nevills never lost a customer, and he himself never capsized a boat, although some of his boatmen did. Magazines and newspapers labeled him "The World’s No. 1 Fast-Water Man."

== Death ==
To overcome the challenge of getting around Mexican Hat, Utah, which was accessible only by bad dirt roads, Nevills took flying lessons and bought a small private airplane in 1946. He used it to fly customers for his river trips, to bring supplies to remote locations, and in general loved flying. He often flew under the Navajo Bridge near Lees Ferry, Utah, and then looped back around and under the bridge. On September 19, 1949, Nevills and his wife, Doris, took off in his Piper J3 from his airstrip in Mexican Hat, Utah, en route to Grand Junction, Colorado. The plane had engine troubles shortly after takeoff, and Nevills tried to turn around, but the plane crashed into the rim of an arroyo, killing them both. A plaque honoring the Nevillses was installed at Navajo Bridge in 1952.
