= Thomas W. Whitaker =

- Born: 13 August 1904; Monrovia, California
- Died: 29 November 1993 (aged 89); La Jolla, California
- Occupations: Botanist, horticulturalist
- Years active: 1936-1990

Thomas Wallace Whitaker (August 13, 1904 – November 29, 1993) was an American botanist and horticulturist who spent most of his career working as a geneticist for the United States Department of Agriculture (USDA). He specialized in the study of economically important plants such as squashes, investigating their systematics and resistance to disease.

== Early life and education ==
Whitaker was born August 14, 1904, in Monrovia, California. He grew up on a farm and worked his way through college, graduating from University of California, Davis in 1927 with a bachelor of science degree. Continuing his education under a DuPont Fellowship, he graduated from the University of Virginia (UVA) with a master's degree in 1929 and PhD in 1931. Both of those degrees were in biology with concentrations in genetics and cytology. While at UVA, he spent summers at the Blandy Experimental Farm. He did postdoctoral work at Bussey Institution and Arnold Arboretum at Harvard University.

== Career ==
Whitaker served as an associate professor at the women-only Agnes Scott College in Decatur, Georgia, from 1934 to 1936. In 1936 he began working as a geneticist for the USDA and remained in that role until he retired in 1973. While with the USDA he lived in La Jolla, California, and worked in the nearby Imperial Valley Experiment Station near Brawley, California. Whitaker specialized in amaryllis, cantaloupes and other Cucurbita, and lettuce in the search for disease resistance and better taste, and he investigated plant systematics. Whitaker died on November 29, 1993, in La Jolla.

== Accolades ==
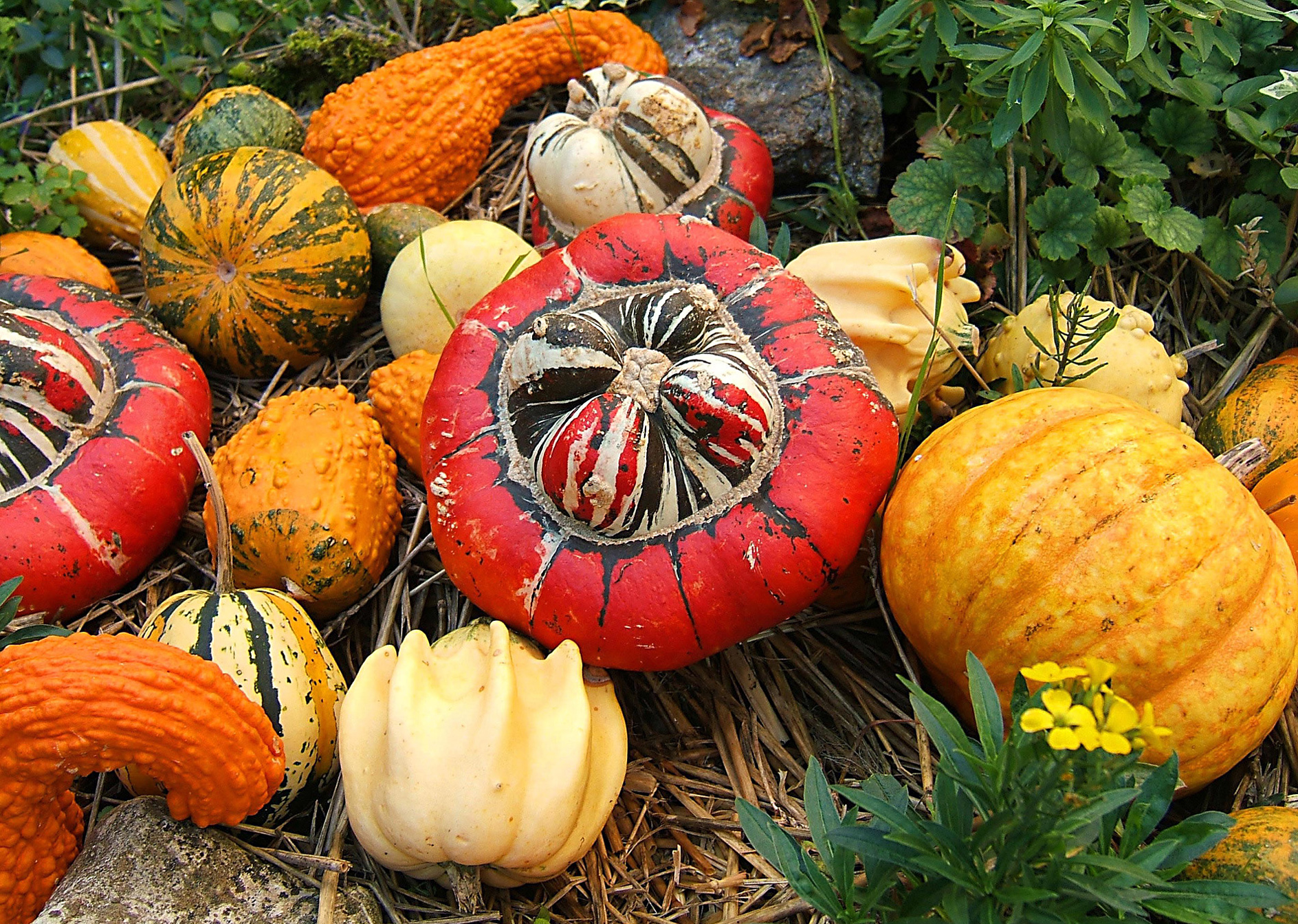
Cucurbita fruits: Whitaker vastly increased knowledge of the genus.

L.C. Merrick and R.W. Robinson, both academics in biological sciences, stated that Whitaker did more to advance knowledge of cucurbits than any other single person, and dedicated the germplasm section of the conference "Cucurbitaceae '98" to him. He was also the recipient of two Guggenheim Fellowships. Volume 3 of Horticultural Reviews (1981) is dedicated to Whitaker. Personally unassuming, on several occasions he is known to have not mentioned himself when discussing a discovery he had made.

Whitaker served in several botanical societies. He was a recipient of the Botanical Society of America's Merit Award and a volume of the society's Horticultural Review is dedicated to him. He was also the recipient in 1976 of that society's highest award, making him a "Distinguished Fellow of the Botanical Society of America": "For distinguished contributions to the understanding of economic plants, notably their improvement, and for a unique contribution in interpreting this understanding in terms of their domestication and their influence on the development of civilizations." After retiring from the USDA, he traveled internationally extensively, collecting over 1,300 seed samples, three-quarters of which were cucurbits. He published over 70 academic articles during his lifetime. His last two articles were published in 1986 and 1990. He was editor of the journal HortScience.

Whitaker named these species:

- (Amaryllidaceae) Amaryllis belladonna L. subsp. quentiniana Traub & Whitaker Pl. Life (Stanford) 27: 46. 1971 (IK) (Note: Index Kewensis)
- (Amaryllidaceae) Amaryllis belladonna subsp. quentiniana Traub & Whitaker Pl. Life (Stanford) 27: 46. 1971 (GCI) (Note: Gray Card Index)
- (Cucurbitaceae) Cucurbita ecuadorensis H.C.Cutler & Whitaker Ann. Missouri Bot. Gard. 55: 392 (1969). (IK)
- (Cucurbitaceae) Cucurbita ecuadorensis H.C.Cutler & Whitaker Ann. Missouri Bot. Gard. 55: 392. 1969 (GCI)

Whitaker was honored with an eponymous summer squash variety, Cucurbita pepo summer-squash zucchini variety (Whitaker). This variety is highly disease-resistant and is parthenocarpic, having no seeds.
