= Cataract Canyon =

Section of the Colorado River

Coordinates: 37°52′39″N 110°17′38″W

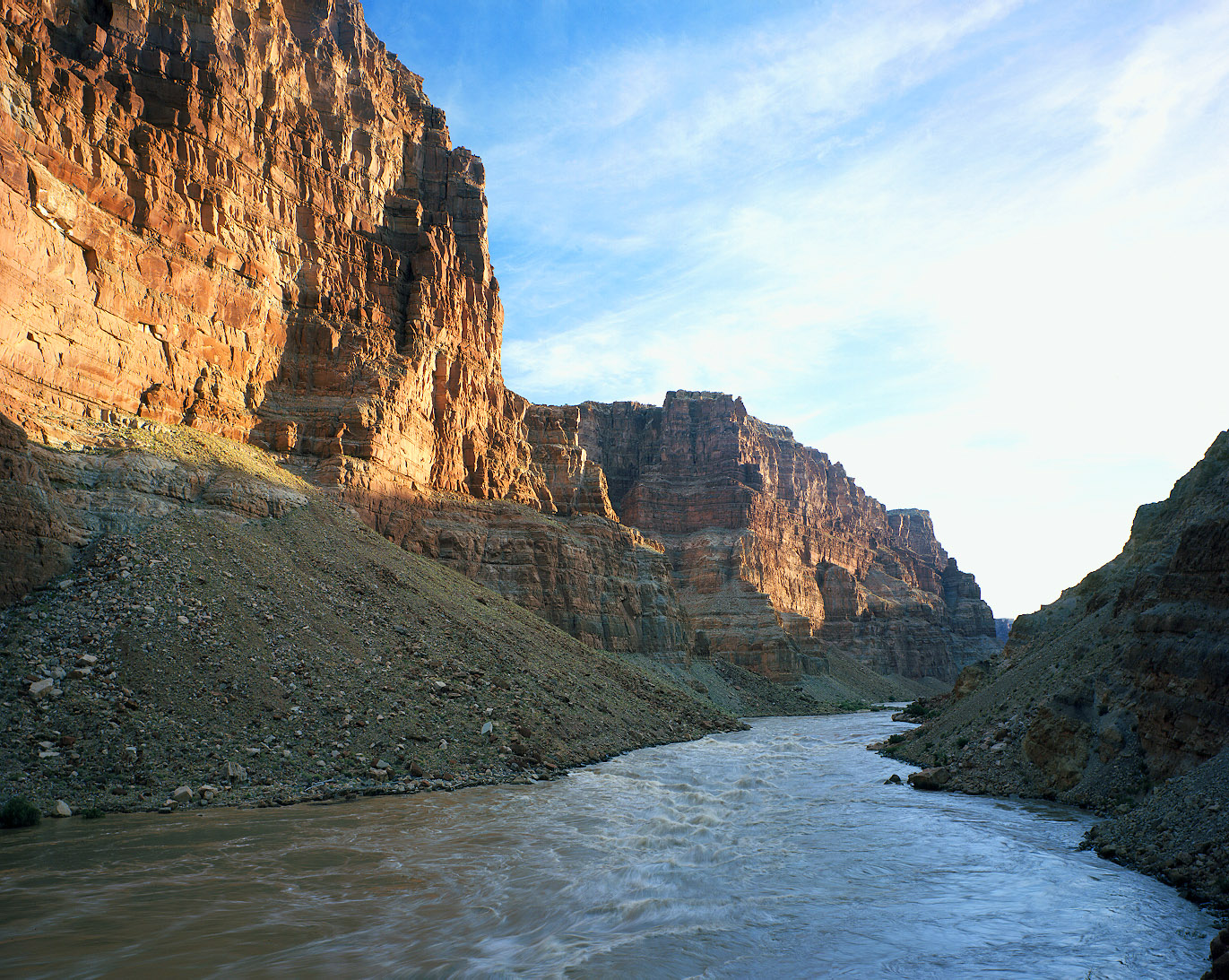
Cataract Canyon, near the Big Drop Rapids

Cataract Canyon is a 46-mile-long (74 km) canyon of the Colorado River located within Canyonlands National Park and Glen Canyon National Recreation Area, in southern Utah. Beginning at the Colorado River's confluence with the Green River, Cataract Canyon's downstream terminus is its confluence with the Dirty Devil River. When the lake is at its normal high water elevation of 3,700 feet (1,100 m), the lower half of the canyon is submerged beneath Lake Powell.

== Geology ==
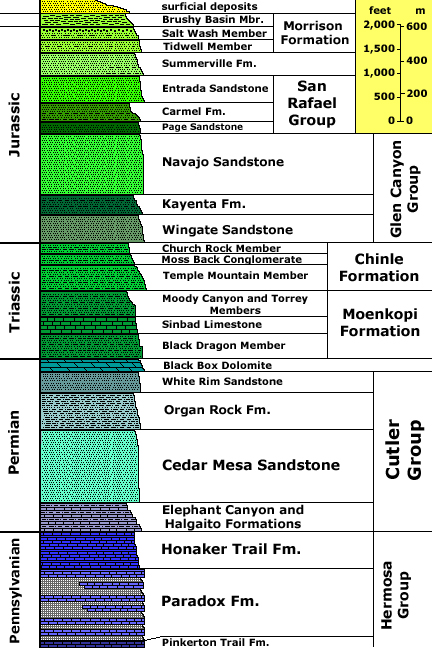
Stratigraphy of the Canyonlands area, USGS

Cataract Canyon is cut by the Colorado River into the Colorado Plateau, a vast continental uplift comprising much of the American Southwest. Until approximately 80 million years ago, the Colorado Plateau was near sea level.

Over millions of years, a series of inland oceans transgressed onto and regressed from the region, resulting in a series of horizontally deposited rock layers. Approximately 70 to 80 million years ago, a series of mountain-building events called the Laramide orogeny uplifted the entire region. The Colorado River subsequently cut through the rock layers, exposing them. The oldest rock layer visible in Cataract Canyon is the Paradox Formation, which was deposited approximately 320 million years ago.

== History ==
Indigenous peoples, most likely of the Fremont culture, inhabited the Canyonlands area long before European settlers arrived. Rock art and ruins that are at least 800 years old have been found in Cataract Canyon.

Because of the remote location, it was some time before European explorers and settlers reached the area. The Colorado River and its canyons were more of an obstacle to travel than a destination to be explored. The first recorded European to reach Cataract Canyon was a fur trapper named Denis Julien in 1836. Julien carved his name into a rock wall in the lower section of Cataract Canyon, though this inscription is now covered by Lake Powell.

The first organized exploration to travel the entire length of Cataract Canyon was the 1869 Powell Expedition, led by John Wesley Powell, a one-armed American Civil War veteran who launched in wooden boats near Green River, Wyoming and traveled down Colorado's Green River to its confluence with the Colorado River at the top of Cataract Canyon. The rapids of Cataract Canyon terrified Powell and his men. The expedition portaged their boats around every rapid in the canyon, a difficult and arduous task. Because of the difficulty of the rapids, Powell named the canyon Cataract Canyon. After exiting Cataract Canyon, Powell continued his trip downstream through Glen Canyon (currently submerged by Lake Powell), and ultimately the Grand Canyon, before ending his trip near the mouth of the Virgin River.

Other river runners soon followed. Nathanial Galloway made numerous trips through the canyon in 1894. Galloway would later pioneer rowing techniques still used by river runners today. Brothers Emery and Ellsworth Kolb traveled through the canyon in 1911. The Kolb brothers eventually established a studio on the south rim of the Grand Canyon, where they featured videos of their exploits running the rapids of the Colorado River. Buzz Holmstrom made a solo trip through Cataract Canyon and Grand Canyon in 1937, eventually ending at the newly constructed Hoover Dam. The first commercial outfitter to offer trips through Cataract Canyon was Norman Nevills in 1938.

The advent of rubber rafts came about in the early 1950s with the availability of surplus rubber rafts from World War II. River runners found the rubber rafts easier to maneuver and much more forgiving than their wooden counterparts. With this newer equipment, many commercial outfitters began running Grand Canyon and Cataract Canyon.

== Whitewater rafting ==
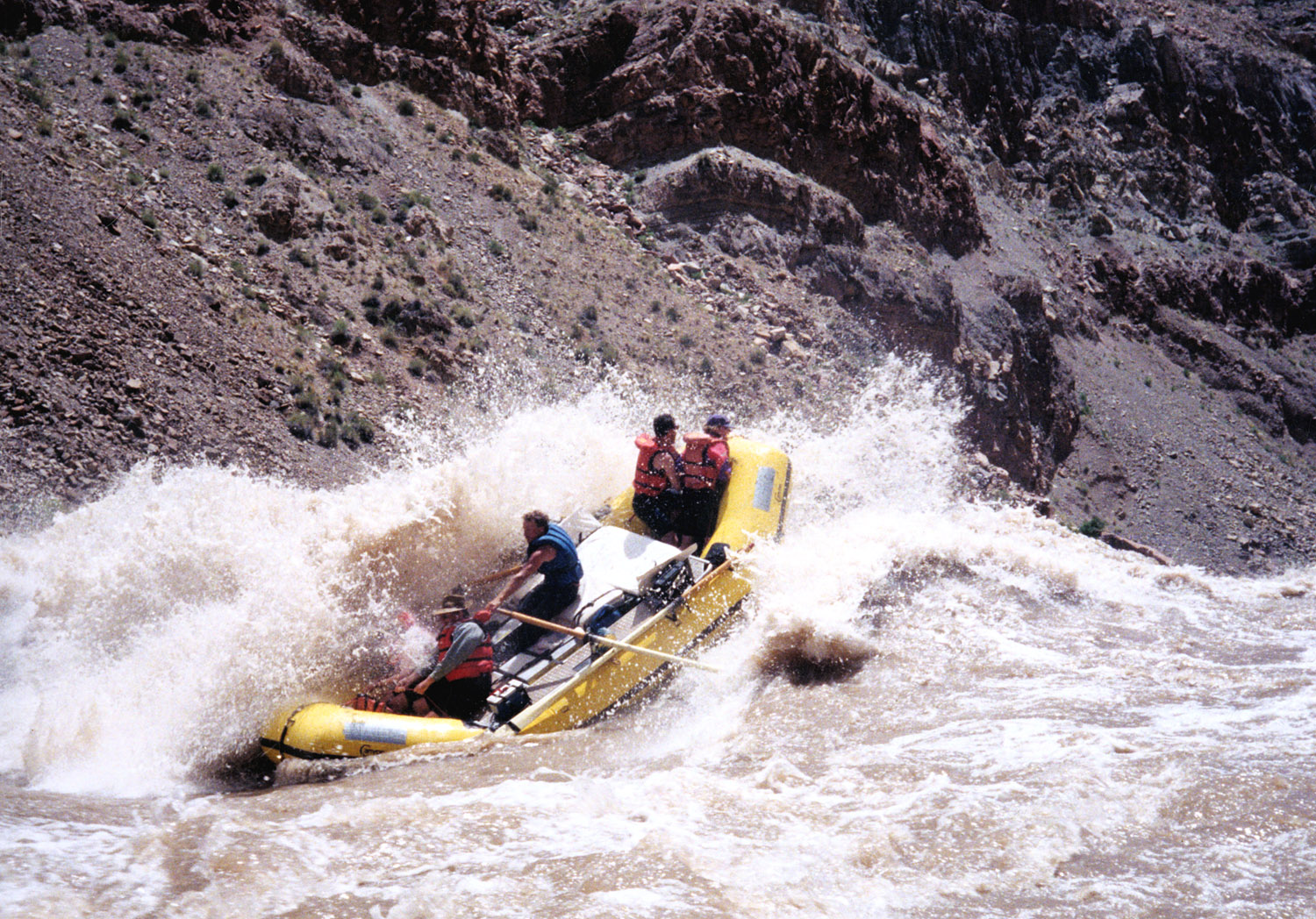
Raft in the Big Drop Rapids, Cataract Canyon

Cataract Canyon remains a popular whitewater rafting destination today. The rapids in the canyon are generally considered "big water", with a character similar to those found in Grand Canyon. Cataract Canyon is rated on the Class I-VI International Scale of River Difficulty, unlike the Grand Canyon, which is rated on a scale of one to ten. Also, unlike Grand Canyon, the flow of the Colorado River through Cataract Canyon is far enough downstream from a dam that it is generally unregulated. The river can reach extreme levels during the spring runoff in years following plentiful snow throughout the Colorado River watershed. During an average spring runoff, the Colorado River will peak at approximately 52,000 cu ft/s (1,500 m^{3}/s). The maximum recorded flow of 114,900 cu ft/s (3,250 m^{3}/s) occurred on May 27, 1984. The rapids of Cataract Canyon become difficult at flows above 30,000 cu ft/s (850 m^{3}/s) and extreme at flows above 50,000 cu ft/s (1,400 m^{3}/s).

Most rapids in Cataract Canyon are simply named from upstream to downstream as Rapid 1, Rapid 2, etc. However, some rapids within the canyon have separate names due to their location or notoriety. Particularly notorious are the "Big Drops", a set of three rapids in short succession named "Big Drop 1", "Big Drop 2" and "Big Drop 3". During high water, these three rapids essentially run together to form one very large rapid. These rapids contain many large hydraulic features, including "Little Niagara", "Satan's Gut", and "The Claw". During times of high runoff, the National Park Service sometimes establishes a camp below the big drops and uses a jetboat to facilitate rescues of capsized rafts and their passengers. However, it is generally understood that all river runners attempting Cataract Canyon at any river level should be capable of self-rescue and not depend on the NPS for support.

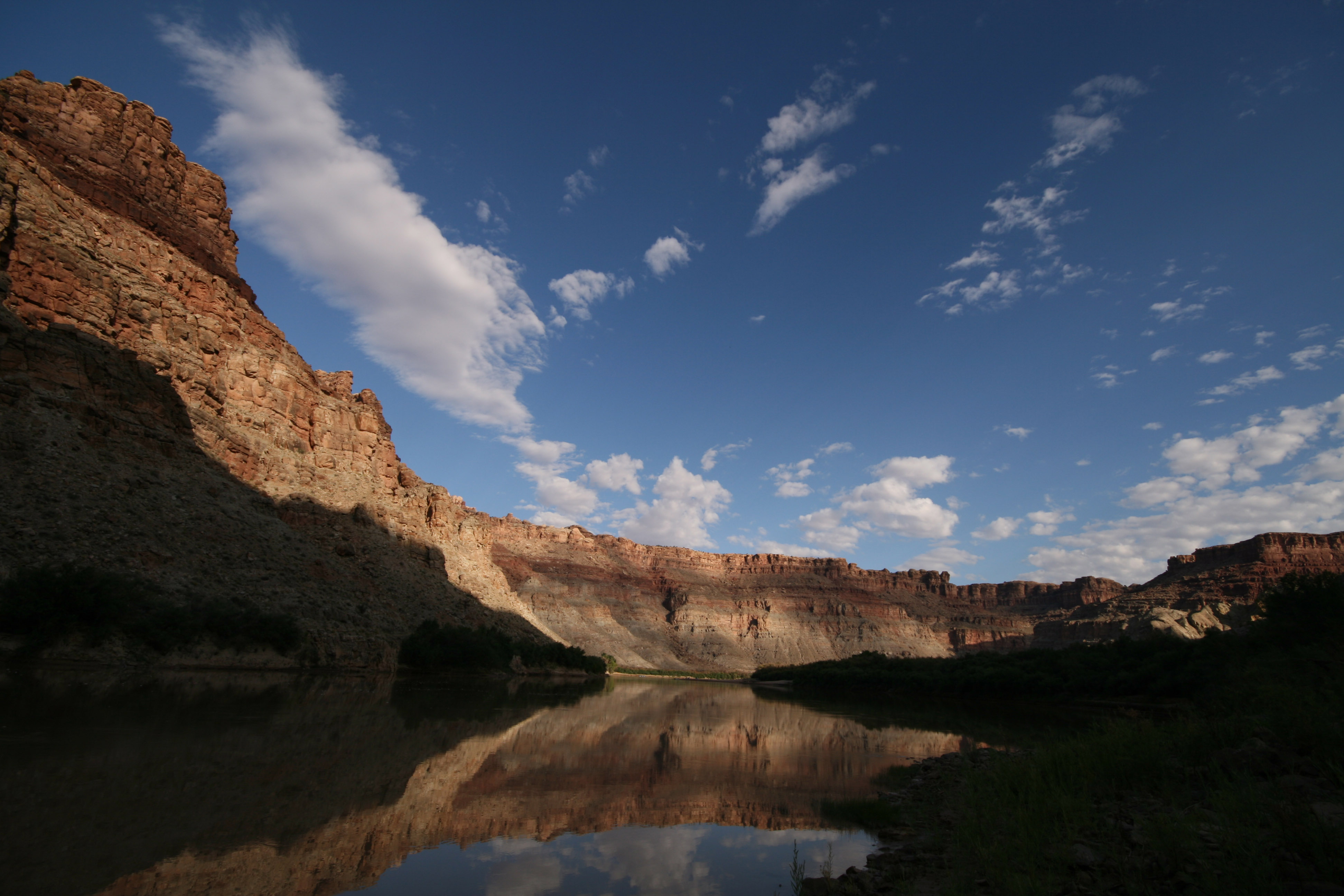
Calm water during sunrise at Spanish Bottom, Cataract Canyon

Cataract Canyon historically contained several rapids, which are currently submerged beneath Lake Powell and have been buried in lake sediment. "Gypsum Canyon Rapid" and "Dark Canyon Rapid" were considered very difficult rapids to navigate.

River trips that run Cataract Canyon must also run one of the flatwater sections above the confluence of the Green and Colorado Rivers. Most groups launch at Potash (on the Colorado River) or Mineral Bottom (on the Green River) and spend up to five days on the river before entering Cataract Canyon. Motorized trips can make the trip into Cataract Canyon in less time, often one day. In addition to the flatwater at the beginning of the trip, all groups must traverse Lake Powell before reaching the take-out at the Dirty Devil River or Hite Marina. Depending on the water level in Lake Powell, up to 35 miles (56 km) of lake water may be encountered by groups exiting the canyon.

Several commercial outfitters offer guided trips through Cataract Canyon. These trips vary between one and six days, and utilize both motorized and non-motorized vessels. Private groups must obtain a permit from the National Park Service before embarking on a Cataract Canyon trip.

== See also ==
- Canyonlands National Park
- List of whitewater rivers
