= Green River, Utah =

City in Utah, United States

City of Green River
- City
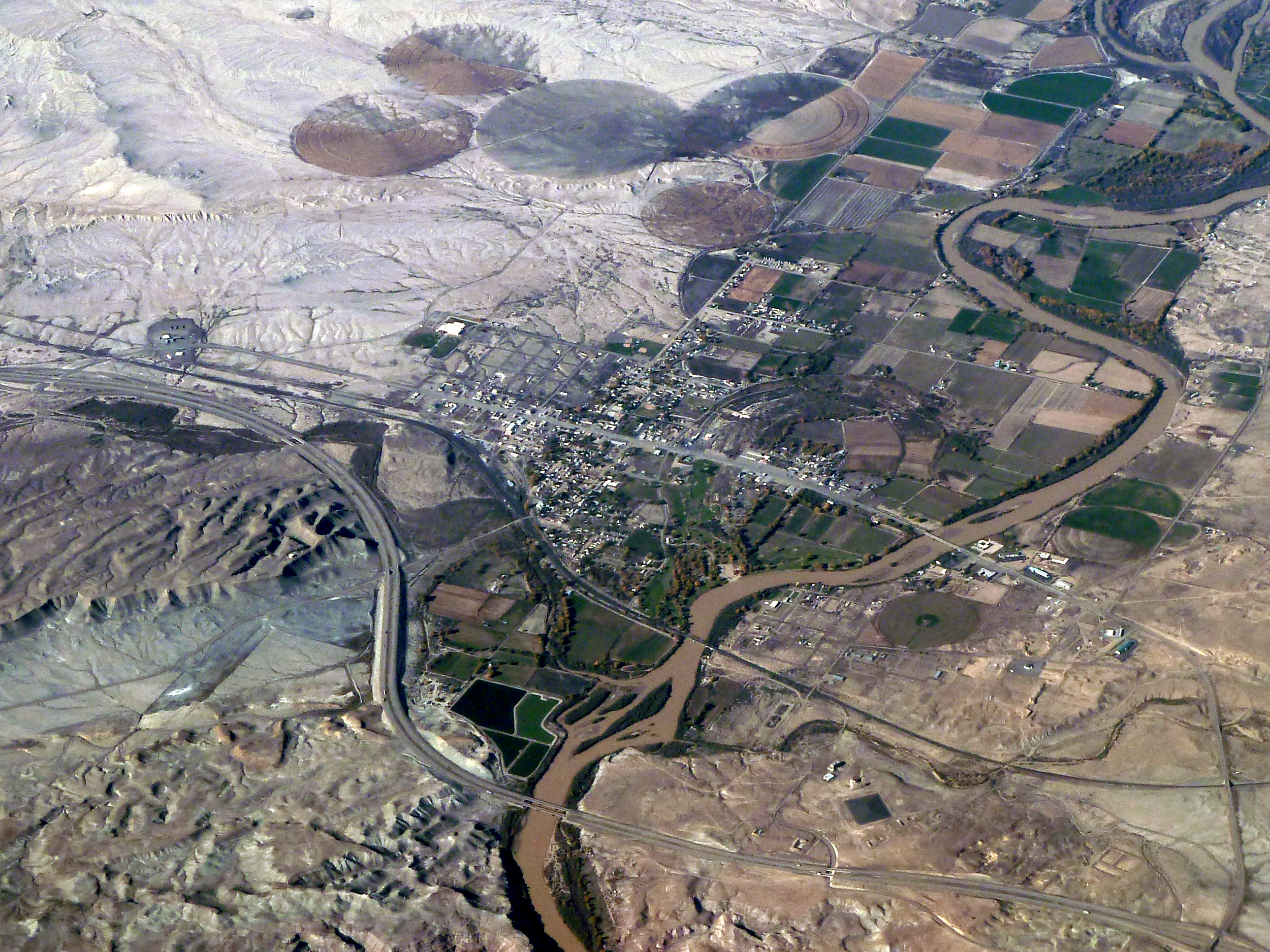
- Aerial of Green River, Utah

- Flag

- Location in Emery County and the state of Utah

- Location of Utah in the United States
- Coordinates: 38°59′36″N 110°9′0″W
- Country: United States
- State: Utah
- County: Emery
- Incorporated: 1906
- Named for: The Green River

Government
  - Mayor: Larry Packer
  - City Manager: David Wilson

Area
  - Total: 27.26 sq mi (70.61 km^{2})
  - Land: 27.14 sq mi (70.29 km^{2})
  - Water: 0.12 sq mi (0.32 km^{2})
- Elevation: 4,078 ft (1,243 m)

Population (2020)
  - Total: 847
  - Density: 34/sq mi (13.3/km^{2})
- Time zone: UTC−7 (Mountain (MST))
  - Summer (DST): UTC−6 (MDT)
- ZIP code: 84525
- Area code: 435
- FIPS code: 49-31670
- GNIS feature ID: 1428398
- Website: greenriver.utah.gov

Green River is a city in Emery County, Utah United States. The population was 847 at the 2020 census.

== History ==
The city of Green River is located on ancestral Ute lands, in the home locale of the Seuvarits/Sheberetch band of Ute people. The Old Spanish Trail trade route passed across the Green River in the area of modern Green River from 1829 into the 1850s.

John Wesley Powell embarked on the first of two voyages down the Green River from Green River, Wyoming, more than 200 miles to the north of Green River, Utah, in May 1869 and floated the river to its confluence with the Colorado and beyond. Powell left a detailed account of the river and the surrounding landscape and prepared the first thorough maps of the river basin. Powell left his mark in other ways as well. He and his men named most of the canyons, geographic features, and rapids along the Green River during his two voyages in 1869 and 1871. Powell also paved the way for later generations of explorers and scientists interested in the unique geology of the basin of the Green River.

The settlement of the Green River started as a river crossing for the U.S. mail. In 1876, Mr. Blake set up a ferry and way station on the east side of the river. It became a stopover for travelers with a ferry transporting people, supplies, and animals across the river. Today, the river is primarily used for recreational and education rafting, canoeing, and kayaking trips. The "Gates of Lodore" portion is most common for recreational trips, as it can be completed in 3-6 days.

The line commonly known as the Utah Division of the Denver and Rio Grande Western Railroad was built in 1883, and a train station was opened. The west side of the river became known as "Greenriver" (later changed to "Green River"), and the east side of the river became known as "Elgin", and is still sometimes referred to by that name today. With the railroad coming, the town quickly went from a small farm hamlet to a boom town, with workers coming to build the bridge and the roadbed for the railroad. After the railroad's completion, the Green River became a fueling and watering stop for the railroad, with switching yards and engine sheds. A hotel called the Palmer House was built and became the scheduled meal stop for trains from both directions for many years. Green River enjoyed the railroad boom until 1892, when the railroad transferred most of its operations to Helper. The population of the town declined significantly.

Throughout the 1940s, 1950s, and 1960s, the mining of uranium played a significant role in the economy of Green River. Several trucking companies hauled ore from mines in the Four-Corners Mining District west of Green River, the San Rafael Swell, the Henry Mountains, and the area that is now Lake Powell.

The U.S. Air Force built the Green River Launch Complex outside Green River in 1964. It was an annex of the U.S. Army's White Sands Missile Range. From 1964 to 1973, the Air Force launched 141 Athena missiles from the Green River complex, near the Crystal Geyser, as part of research to improve nuclear missiles.

== Geography ==
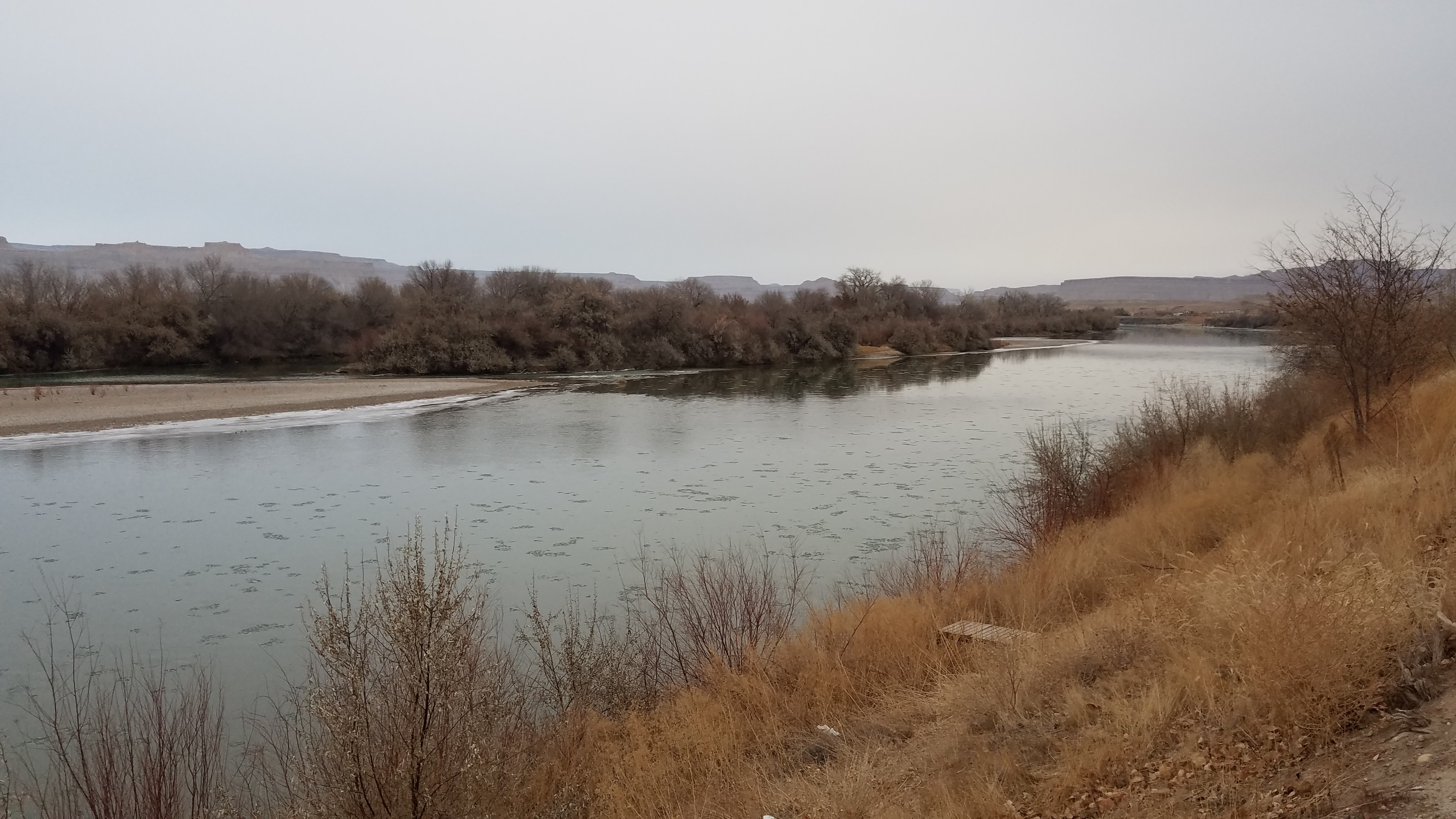
Looking north along the Green River from the city

The city is located on the banks of the Green River, a major tributary of the Colorado River. The San Rafael Swell region is located west of the city, while Canyonlands National Park lies to the south. Today located exclusively in Emery County, the city was split between Emery and Grand counties until January 6, 2003, when Emery County's boundaries were expanded to follow the city limits.

According to the United States Census Bureau, the city of Green River has a land area of 27.14 square miles (70,287,692 m^{2}), and a water area 0.12 square miles (319,726 m^{2}).

Interstate 70 passes just south of the city, with access from Exits 160 and 164. Grand Junction, Colorado 102 miles (164 km) and Denver 343 miles (552 km) lie to the east. Cove Fort, I-70's western terminus, is 162 miles (261 km) to the west with Las Vegas 406 miles (653 km) via Interstate 15 from Cove Fort. Price lies 64 miles (103 km) to the northwest on US Routes 6 and 191 as well as Salt Lake City 168 miles (270 km) via Interstate 15 from Spanish Fork.

=== Climate ===
Green River has a moderate desert climate (Köppen BWk).

Climate data for Green River Municipal Airport, UT
Month	Jan	Feb	Mar	Apr	May	Jun	Jul	Aug	Sep	Oct	Nov	Dec	Year
Record high °F (°C)	65 (18)	71 (22)	84 (29)	93 (34)	102 (39)	108 (42)	113 (45)	110 (43)	102 (39)	92 (33)	75 (24)	68 (20)	113 (45)
Mean daily maximum °F (°C)	41.1 (5.1)	50.5 (10.3)	62.9 (17.2)	72.0 (22.2)	82.2 (27.9)	93.0 (33.9)	98.5 (36.9)	94.9 (34.9)	86.0 (30.0)	71.3 (21.8)	55.6 (13.1)	43.5 (6.4)	71.0 (21.7)
Daily mean °F (°C)	27.4 (−2.6)	35.9 (2.2)	46.6 (8.1)	55.1 (12.8)	64.5 (18.1)	74.1 (23.4)	79.9 (26.6)	77.5 (25.3)	67.5 (19.7)	54.1 (12.3)	40.1 (4.5)	30.0 (−1.1)	54.4 (12.4)
Mean daily minimum °F (°C)	13.7 (−10.2)	21.3 (−5.9)	30.3 (−0.9)	38.2 (3.4)	46.8 (8.2)	55.1 (12.8)	61.3 (16.3)	60.0 (15.6)	49.0 (9.4)	36.9 (2.7)	24.6 (−4.1)	16.5 (−8.6)	37.8 (3.2)
Record low °F (°C)	−25 (−32)	−22 (−30)	6 (−14)	15 (−9)	23 (−5)	33 (1)	40 (4)	37 (3)	25 (−4)	12 (−11)	−6 (−21)	−16 (−27)	−25 (−32)
Average precipitation inches (mm)	0.49 (12)	0.59 (15)	0.71 (18)	0.59 (15)	0.56 (14)	0.38 (9.7)	0.80 (20)	0.78 (20)	0.84 (21)	0.98 (25)	0.45 (11)	0.43 (11)	7.60 (193)
Average snowfall inches (cm)	3.4 (8.6)	0.6 (1.5)	0.8 (2.0)	0 (0)	0 (0)	0 (0)	0 (0)	0 (0)	0 (0)	0 (0)	0.3 (0.76)	2.5 (6.4)	7.6 (19)

== Demographics ==
Historical population
Census	Pop.	Note	%±
1890	375		—
1900	222		−40.8%
1910	628		182.9%
1920	645		2.7%
1930	474		−26.5%
1940	470		−0.8%
1950	583		24.0%
1960	1,075		84.4%
1970	1,033		−3.9%
1980	1,048		1.5%
1990	866		−17.4%
2000	973		12.4%
2010	952		−2.2%
2020	847		−11.0%
U.S. Decennial Census

The median income for a household in the city was $42,361. About 21.1% of the population were below the poverty line.

=== Racial and ethnic composition ===
Racial composition as of the 2020 census
Race	Number	Percent
White	595	70.2%
Black or African American	0	0.0%
American Indian and Alaska Native	2	0.2%
Asian	5	0.6%
Native Hawaiian and Other Pacific Islander	0	0.0%
Some other race	99	11.7%
Two or more races	146	17.2%
Hispanic or Latino (of any race)	280	33.1%

=== 2020 census ===
As of the 2020 census, Green River had a population of 847, for a population density of 34.45 people per square mile (13.30 people/km^{2}). The median age was 37.2 years; 28.2% of residents were under the age of 18 and 14.2% of residents were 65 years of age or older. For every 100 females there were 96.5 males, and for every 100 females age 18 and over there were 97.4 males age 18 and over.

0.0% of residents lived in urban areas, while 100.0% lived in rural areas.

There were 327 households in Green River, of which 39.4% had children under the age of 18 living in them. Of all households, 48.6% were married-couple households, 15.6% were households with a male householder and no spouse or partner present, and 26.9% were households with a female householder and no spouse or partner present. About 23.3% of all households were made up of individuals and 10.1% had someone living alone who was 65 years of age or older.

There were 397 housing units at an average density of 14.5 units per square mile (5.6 units/km^{2}), of which 17.6% were vacant. The homeowner vacancy rate was 0.0% and the rental vacancy rate was 1.0%.

== Economy ==
Located approximately 100 miles (160 km) from both Richfield, Utah, and Grand Junction, Colorado, Green River's local economy primarily caters to serving passers-by on Interstate 70, since there are no services on I-70 westbound between Green River and Salina, 107 miles (172 km) away. The economy relies heavily on hotels, fast food, and a few other restaurants and gas stations. A large natural gas field has been discovered 3 miles (5 km) south of the city. The field is operated by Delta Petroleum, headquartered in Denver, Colorado.

Green River is famous for its melons, sold during the growing season, and has an annual Melon Days Festival. It is also a popular freeride mountain biking spot.

A proposed nuclear power plant, the Blue Castle Project, is located approximately five miles west-northwest of the town.

== Infrastructure ==
=== Transportation ===
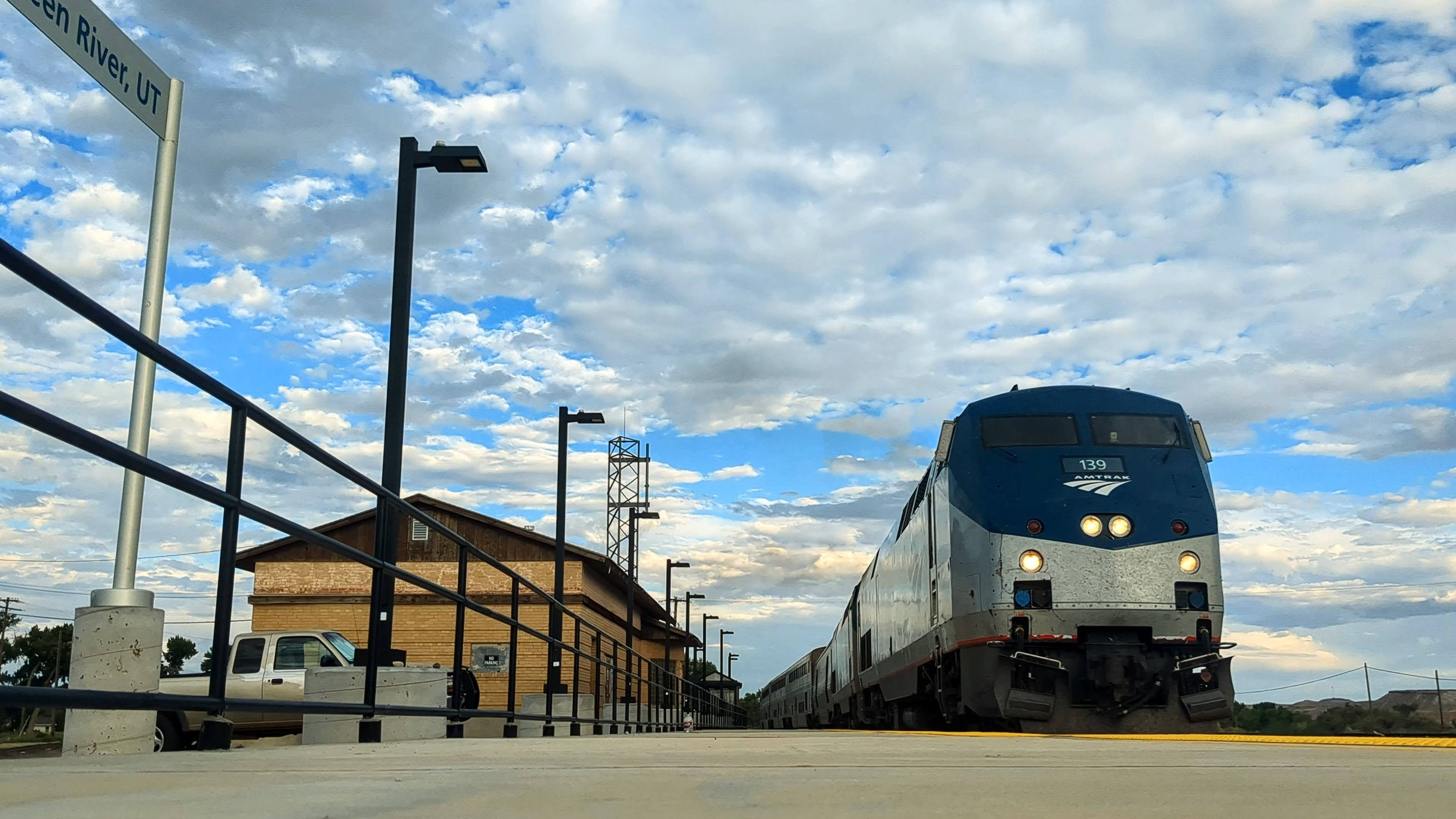
Amtrak #5 pulling into Green River

Amtrak, the national passenger rail system, provides service to Green River station, operating its California Zephyr daily in both directions between Chicago and Emeryville, California.

Interstate 70, along with U.S. 6, U.S. 191, and U.S. 50, also passes through Green River, the first eastbound services after Salina and the final westbound services, because the two cities are 110 miles (180 km) apart, the longest stretch of the interstate with no services in the United States.

The Main road in Green River is a short State road, SR 19, with Business I-70.

== Notable people ==
- Bert Loper, river-runner

== In popular culture ==
The town becomes the new home of the Mousekewitz-family in An American Tail: Fievel Goes West as well as the main location in the subsequent television series Fievel's American Tails.

Two chapters of Stephen King's novel The Stand are set in a post-apocalyptic Green River.

Green River is the home of three of the characters in Edward Abbey's novel, The Monkey Wrench Gang.

== See also ==
- List of municipalities in Utah
