= Wade Graham (writer) =

American author, historian, environmentalist and garden designer

Wade Livingston Graham
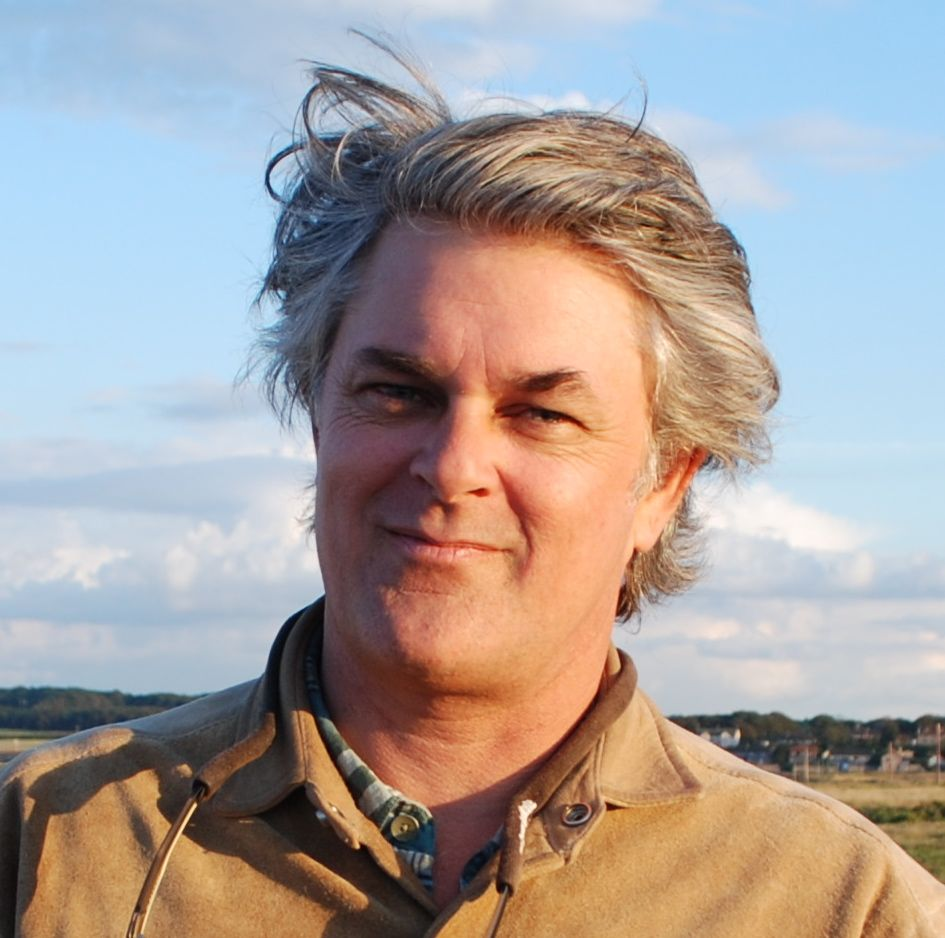
- Wade Graham
- Born: May 8, 1967 (age 59)
- Education: Columbia University (BA); University of California, Los Angeles (MA, PhD)
- Occupations: Writer; historian; landscape designer
- Writing career
- Genres: Landscape Design; History; Urbanism

Wade Livingston Graham (born May 8, 1967) is an American author, historian, environmentalist, and garden designer. Graham works at a confluence of several disciplines, including environmental history, landscape design, critical urbanism, art, and politics. He is a garden designer based in Los Angeles, and is an environmental historian of the Western United States, especially Molokai in the Hawaiian Islands and the political ecology of Glen Canyon. Graham has published several books on urbanism, landscape design, and environmental history. In addition to his books, Graham has contributed articles to The New Yorker, Harper's Weekly, The Los Angeles Times, and Outside on various subjects for more than twenty years.

== Biography ==
He earned his B.A. in comparative literature at Columbia University in 1989 and an M.A. in history at the University of California, Los Angeles in 1999. He received a Ph.D in history from UCLA in 2006.

Since 2009, he has been an adjunct professor of public policy at Pepperdine University.

== Career ==
=== Garden design ===
Graham is a garden designer and historian of American garden design. He has designed gardens for film producer John Goldwyn and actors Jennifer Garner and Lisa Edelstein. Graham has designed gardens throughout Southern California, as well as in Hawaii, New York, Florida, and Baja California, Mexico. He wrote the 2011 history of American garden design, American Eden: From the Monticello to Central Park to Our Backyards, What Our Gardens Tell Us About Ourselves, called a "foundational study" by Kevin Starr and a "fresh, critical, and ecologically astute masterwork" by Booklist. Graham was a guest on the Colbert Report in connection with American Eden. (Note: Graham appearance on Episode 869 of The Colbert Report with Stephen Colbert, April 28, 2011 (video).) In 2011, he was profiled in The New York Times for his work as a garden designer and writer.

=== Southern California ===
As an authority on Southern California's historical, environmental, and urban civic discourse, Graham has made numerous radio and television appearances, including on PBS and C-SPAN. He spoke as an expert on Los Angeles history in the WNYC Studios and KCRW podcast There Goes the Neighborhood. He has also been a panelist for KCRW Town Hall events.

=== Molokai ===
Graham is an expert on the Hawaiian island of Molokai. In 2018, he published the book Braided Waters: Environment and Society in Molokai, Hawaii, considered "essential reading for those interested in the environmental history of Hawai'i" and "an invaluable contribution to the historical literature about Molokai and the Hawaiian Islands in general" by subject experts.

=== Glen Canyon ===
Graham has advocated the ecological restoration of Glen Canyon and the removal of the Glen Canyon Dam. Since 1999, he has been a trustee of Glen Canyon Institute and the editor of Hidden Passage, The Journal of Glen Canyon Institute.

== Bibliography ==
- Graham, Wade (2011). Jesus Is My Gardener. Kindle Single.
- —— (2011). American Eden: From the Monticello to Central Park to Our Backyards, What Our Gardens Tell Us About Ourselves. New York City: HarperCollins Publishers. ISBN 9780061583438.
- —— (2012). "Blueprinting the Regional City: The Urban and Environmental Legacies of the Air Industry in Southern California". In Westwick, Peter (ed.). Blue Sky Metropolis: The Aerospace Century in Southern California. University of California Press. pp. 247–275. ISBN 9780520289062.
- —— (2016). Dream Cities: Seven Urban Ideas That Shape the World. New York City: HarperCollins Publishers. ISBN 9780062196323.
- —— (2018). Braided Waters: Environment and Society in Molokai, Hawaii. Oakland, California: University of California Press. ISBN 9780520298590.
