= River bugging =

Whitewater sport

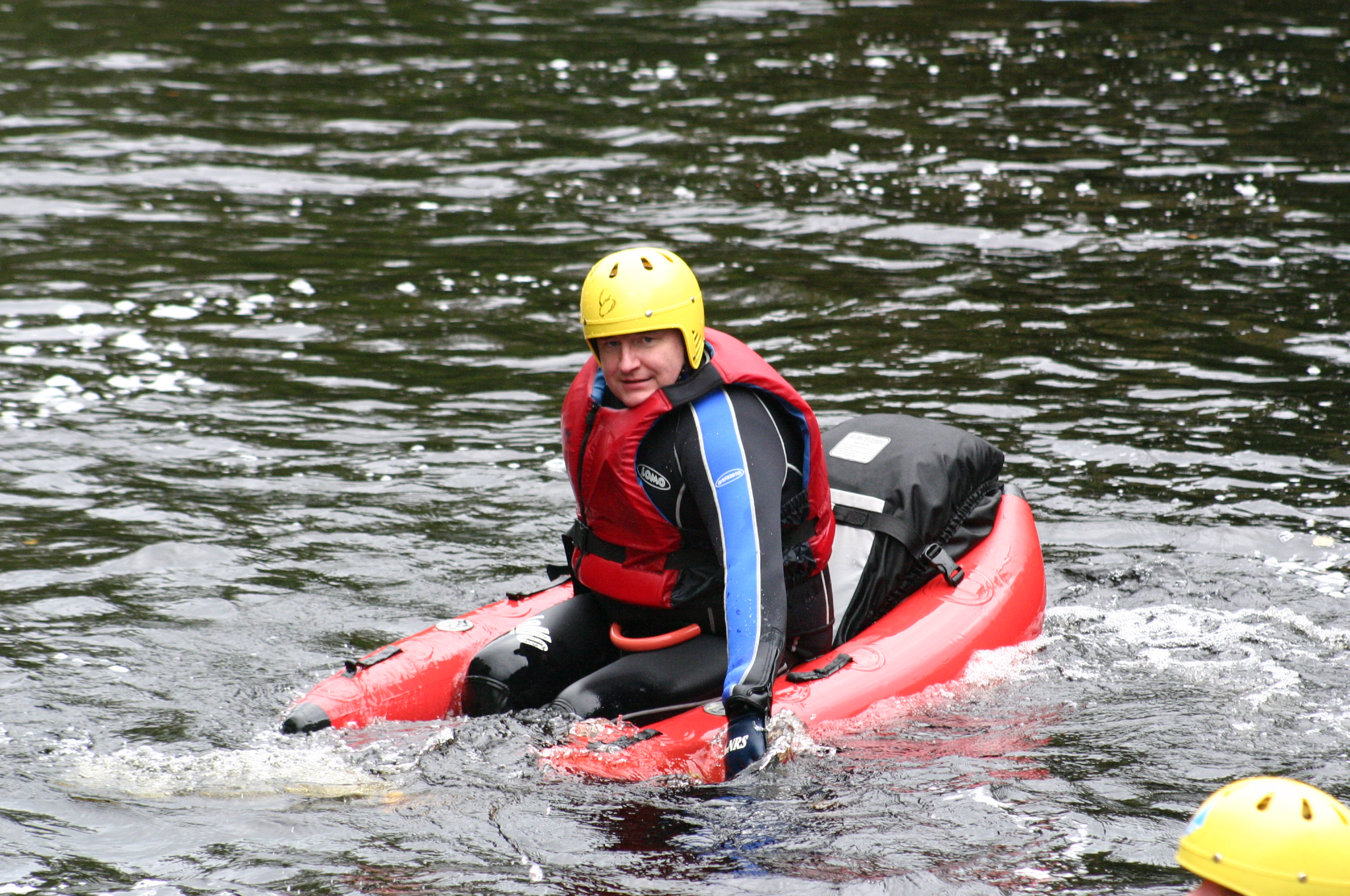
River bug in still water

River bugging is a whitewater sport where a single person navigates a stretch of river in a craft known as a river bug. A river bug is a small inflatable craft with an inflatable tube at each side of the user and an inflatable back rest behind. The user sits between the tubes and can be secured into the craft by means of a waist strap.

The user normally wears a wetsuit, swim fins and paddle mitts whilst "bugging". The swim fins and paddle mitts are the only means of steering and propulsion, as no paddle is carried on a river bug. Bugging is done "feet first", which helps the user push off rocks etc. whilst navigating the rapids of a river. The river bug was inspired by the desire to improve on the practice of descending a river on an inner tube.

River bugging is largely done as a sport organised by whitewater rafting activity providers. The sport originated in New Zealand, but is gaining popularity in the UK, and mainland Europe.

River bugs are also now being used for other activities such as BugPolo a sport similar to water polo.

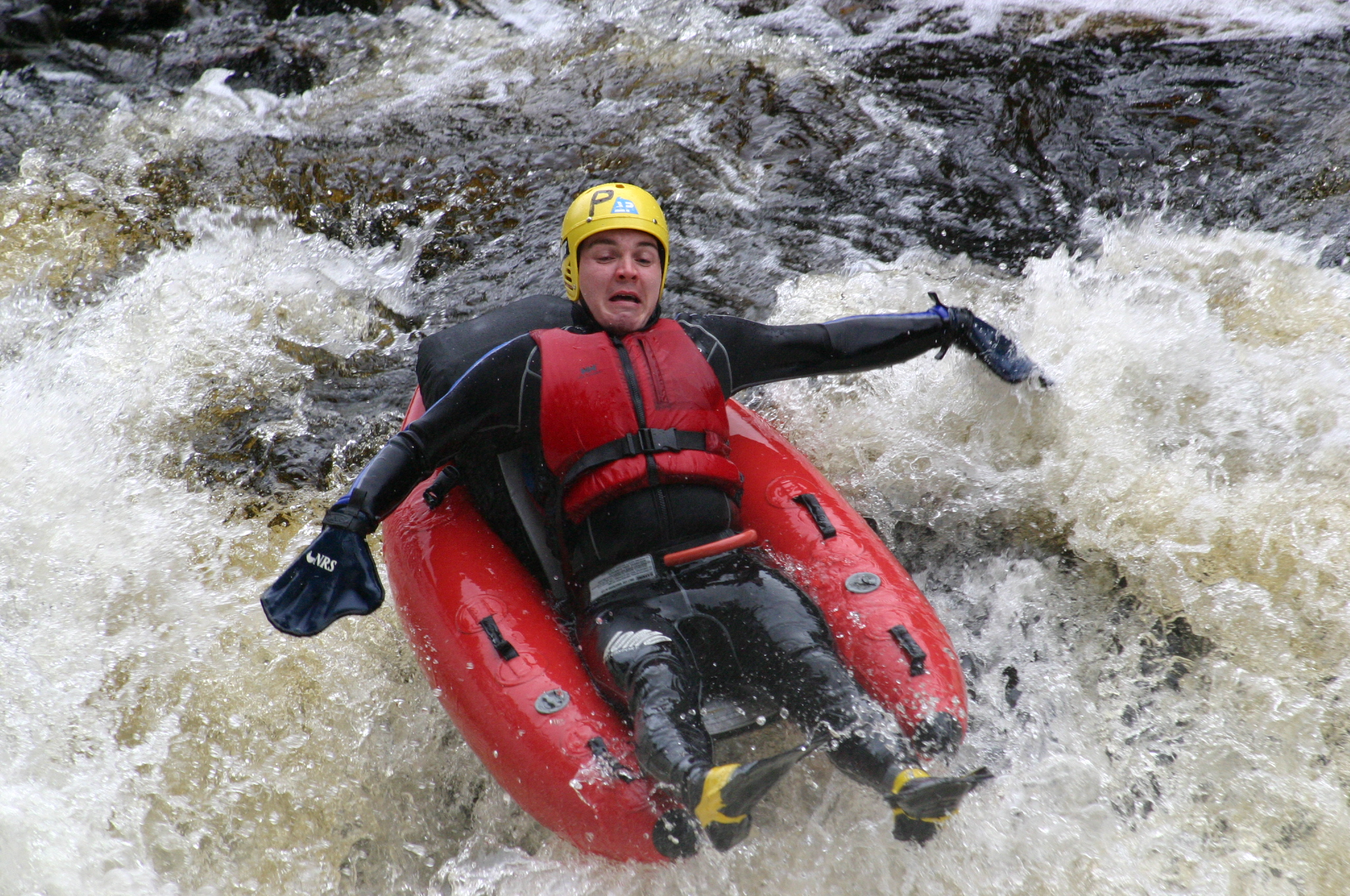
River bug in rapids
