= Martin Litton (environmentalist) =

American conservationist (1917–2014)

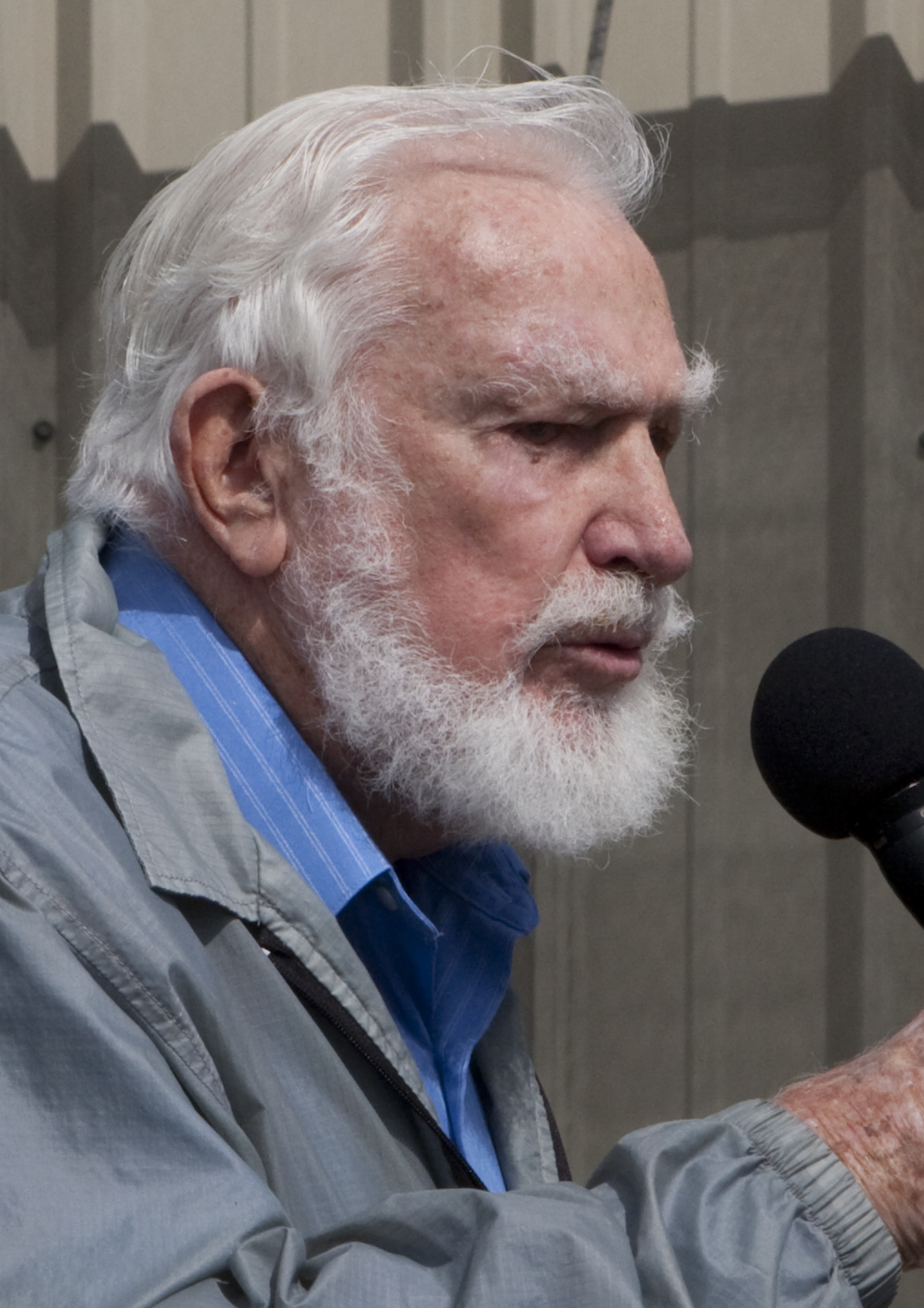
- Martin Litton in 2009.
- Born: February 13, 1917; Los Angeles, California, U.S.
- Died: November 30, 2014 (aged 97); Portola Valley, California, U.S.
- Occupations: River runner, Conservationist, editor
- Known for: Opposition to the Glen Canyon Dam

Clyde Martin Litton (February 13, 1917 – November 30, 2014) was a Grand Canyon river runner and a longtime conservationist, best known as a staunch opponent of the construction of Glen Canyon Dam and other dams on the Colorado River.

Litton grew up in Gardena, California, not too far from Alondra Park. Although not a well-known environmental activist until the 1950s, as early as October 1935 he wrote a letter to the Los Angeles Times at the age of 18, which read in part: "The people of the entire state should rise up against the destruction of Mono Lake. Mono Lake is a gem-among California's greatest scenic attractions."

Litton and his wife Esther first floated the Colorado River through the Grand Canyon in 1955 with Plez Talmadge "Pat" Reilly, at the time joining the first 200 to 300 people known to have made the trip down the river from Lee's Ferry to the Grand Wash Cliffs, first pioneered by John Wesley Powell. He ran the river again in 1956, rowing one of Pat's fiberglass Cataract boats, and again in 1962, rowing a modified McKenzie River dory. Litton continued to run the Colorado for decades afterward, founding Grand Canyon Dories in 1971 and running commercial river trips through the 1970s and 1980s. Litton showed a contrarian preference for using small wooden boats, known as dories, at a time when other river runners had mostly switched to inflatable rubber rafts. These boats were originally used in Oregon; and it was Litton who adapted their use to the Colorado River commercial river trips. He sold the business in 1988.

Litton was a close friend of David Brower, Edward Abbey, and other major figures in the conservation movement. Brower first recruited him in 1952 for a campaign to oppose the construction of two dams in Dinosaur National Monument. Congress voted down approval for the dams in 1956. This began a longtime association with the Sierra Club and a lifelong opposition to dam-building on the Colorado. He was active in the fight to stop dams from being constructed within Grand Canyon National Park. A 1964 river trip led by Martin Litton, which included David Brower, Philip Hyde and author Francois Leydet, led to the publication of the 1964 book authored by Leydet, Time and the River Flowing, with photographs by Ansel Adams, Philip Hyde and others, which helped galvanize opposition to the proposed dams within the Grand Canyon.

Between 1954 and 1968 he was the travel editor for Sunset magazine. In 1960, Sunset ran a cover story entitled "The Redwood Country," which is credited with launching a campaign which eventually led to the establishment of Redwood National Park.

Litton was the author of the 1968 book The Life and Death of Lake Mead. He has been featured in documentary films including Monumental: David Brower's Fight for Wild America and River Runners of the Grand Canyon.

Litton served on the board of directors of the Sierra Club from 1964 to 1973. In 1990 he convinced Harriet Burgess to found the American Land Conservancy and served on the executive committee for ten years. Litton founded the organization Sequoia ForestKeeper® in 2001 and served as president until his death. He served on the Advisory Committee of the Southern Utah Wilderness Alliance and on the Honorary Board of Directors of the Glen Canyon Institute. On November 30, 2014, he died at his home in Portola Valley, California, aged 97.
