= Music Temple =

Coordinates: 37°09′46″N 110°55′25″W

Music Temple is a geological feature near the Colorado River in Glen Canyon, southern Utah, on the Navajo Nation, United States, which consists of a grotto with high, vaulting walls and a deep central pool of water.

It was named by John Wesley Powell in 1869 because of its unusual acoustic properties: reportedly, a one-second note would reverberate for eleven seconds. It was considered one of the more beautiful natural formations of the area in the late 19th century and into the mid-20th century.

Music Temple is within the area that was inundated by Lake Powell, formed by the construction of Glen Canyon Dam. It was submerged by the mid-1960s as the lake filled. As the lake declined in contents over due to a long term drought, the feature is partially exposed.

== Sources ==
- University of Utah
