= McKenzie River dory =

Adaptation of the open-water dory

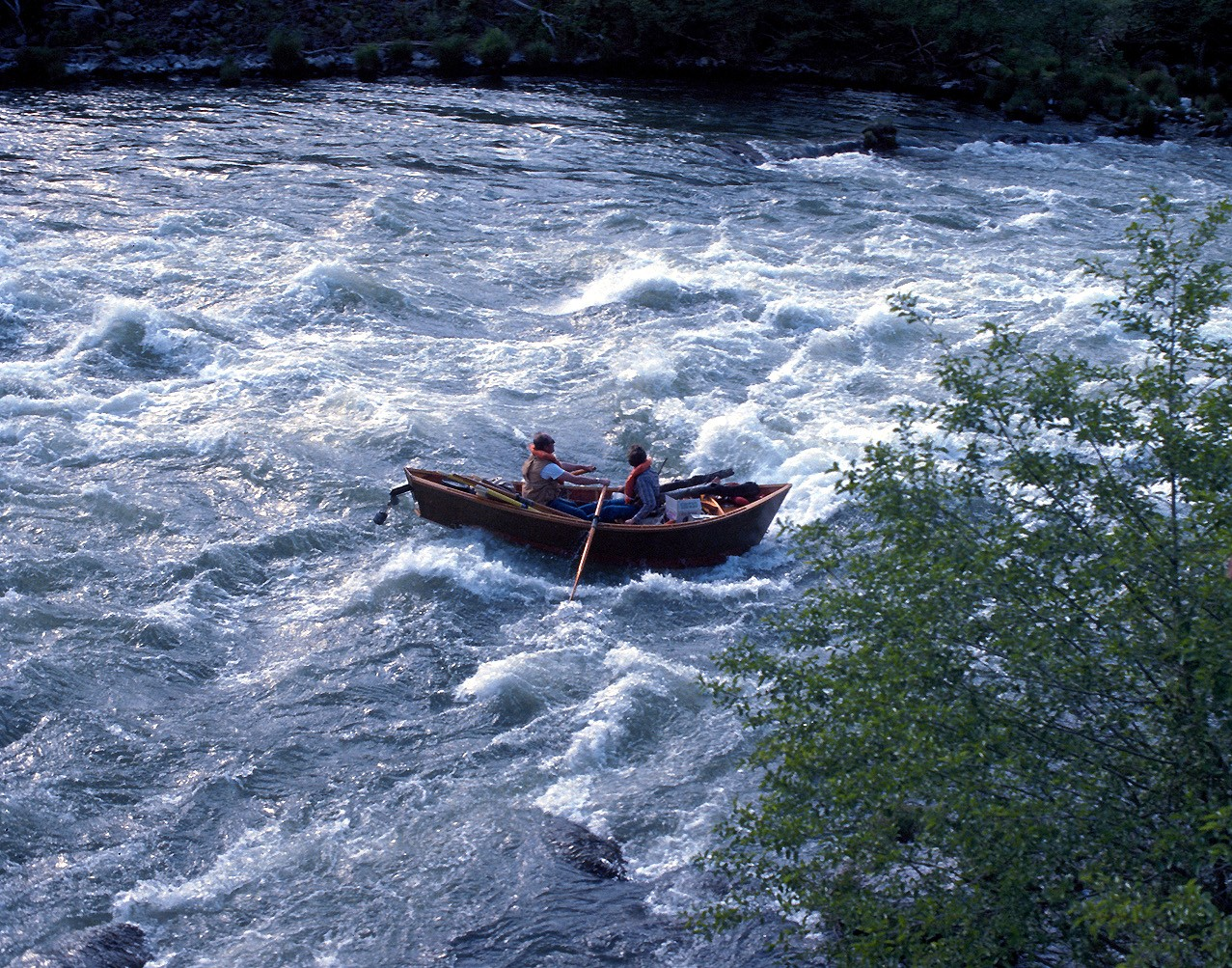
A McKenzie River dory, or drift boat, on the Boxcar Rapids of the Deschutes River near Maupin, Oregon.

The McKenzie River dory, or drift boat, is an adaptation of the open-water dory converted for use in rivers. A variant of the boat's hull is called a modified McKenzie dory or Rogue River dory. The McKenzie designs are characterized by a wide, flat bottom, flared sides, a narrow, flat bow, and a pointed stern. The sole identifying characteristic of the McKenzie River dory is a continuous rocker (the arc from bow to stern along the bottom of the boat). It is this constant rocker that allows the boat to spin about its center for ease in maneuvering in rapids.

== History ==
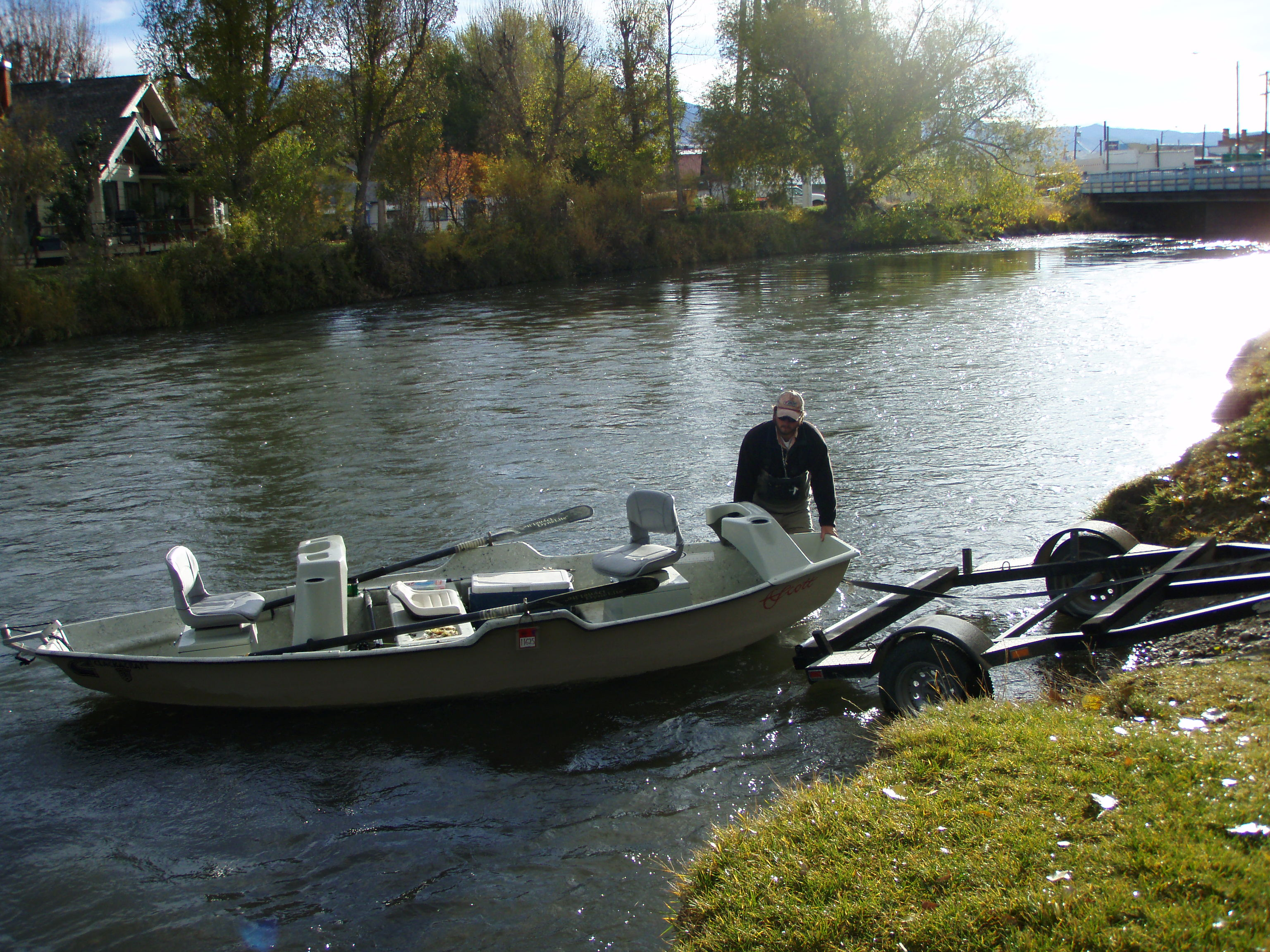
Drift boat launch on the Beaverhead river, Twin Bridges, Montana.

McKenzie River dories are specialized to run rapids on rivers, and first appeared on the McKenzie River in Oregon in the mid-20th century. A prolific McKenzie River dory boat builder in the 1940s and 1950s was Wood "Woodie" Knoble Hindman. Woodie had learned to build these steep rocker boats from master boat builder Torkel "Tom" Kaarhus. The McKenzie River dory Woodie made had a pronounced continuous rocker with a wide flat bottom for low draft, a narrow bow that is flat, often mistaken for the transom, which instead is pointed. The reason for this is that the rower faces downstream, therefore the part of the boat which first hits the waves (approaching from behind) must be pointed or very narrow to throw the water to the side. The bow is then widened so that a small anchor bracket can be attached. Those unfamiliar with the craft would say that they are rowed backwards. A McKenzie dory without a transom is a type of "double-ender".

== Uses ==
McKenzie River dories are mainly used by recreational boaters who wish to operate a very responsive boat. Like the Rogue River boats described below, the McKenzie River dory provides a much more responsive boating experience than that of a rubber raft. While a dory is a safe watercraft, operating an open dory requires keeping river conditions in mind at all times.

== Boat hull materials ==
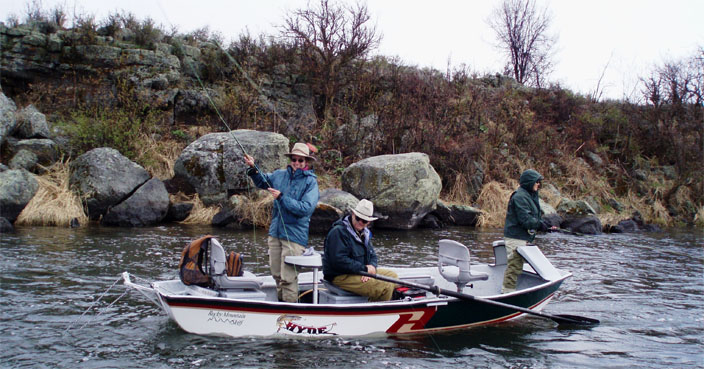
Anglers fly fishing drift boat.

The earliest drift boats were made out of various types of wood. Plywood with waterproof glue became available in the late 1930s, and plywood quickly became the construction material of choice for dory builders like Woodie Hindman. Later, boats were made with lower maintenance materials like aluminum, fiberglass, or plastic.

In 1992, the film "A River Runs Through It" featured a wooden drift boat running "the shoots", a series of rapids, which were filmed in Montana.

The portrayal of using drift boats in class I-IV rapids is only one application for this unique watercraft. Today, river fishing is among the major uses of these boats. Innovation has changed the design from anglers primarily sitting in the boat while fishing, to today's application of anglers standing in a leg brace to fish.

== Rogue River dory ==
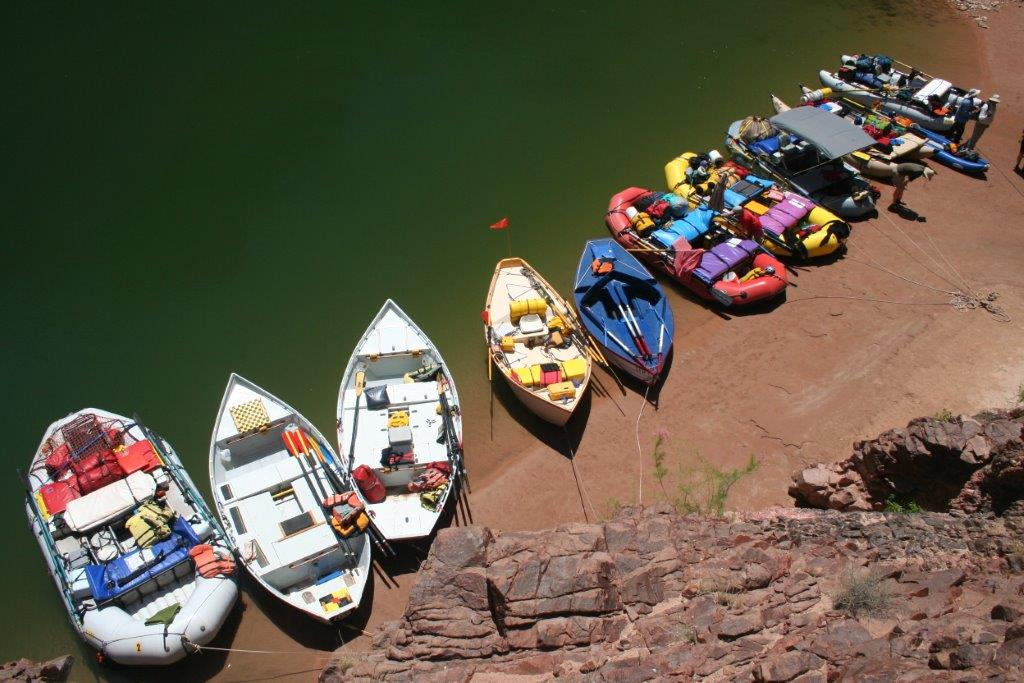
Large Rogue River hull dories (left) and smaller McKenzie River hull dories in the Grand Canyon.

Unlike the McKenzie River dories with a continuously curved floor line, the Rogue River dories are completely flat on the bottom. That means they are not only flat from side to side, but front to back through the midsection of the boat, until the floor gets close to the bow or stern, where the floor then makes a steep upward rake to the brow and the stern.

Rogue River boats often have a narrower floor but are wider at the gunnels, resulting in more "flare" in the side panels than what is found with the McKenzie boats. The Rogue River guides needed a boat with greater carrying capacity, and the ability to hold the current. The Rogue River dory is not quite as responsive as the McKenzie River dory but is typically larger than the McKenzie dory and is used where many people and large amounts of gear need to be carried. The high prow and greater carrying capacity makes it the preferred dory for commercial use.

== Grand Canyon dory ==
The classic 17-foot (5.2 m) long flat-bottomed Rogue River dory with a nearly full deck is a favorite among guides on the Colorado River and was pioneered in Grand Canyon by Martin Litton beginning in 1963. These boats were built for Litton first by Oregon boatbuilders Keith Steele and later Jerry Briggs. On the same river, the sporty 15-to-16-foot (4.6 to 4.9 m) long arc-bottomed McKenzie River dory, fully decked, was pioneered by Stephen Moulton Babcock Fulmer in 1955. Although it carries less gear, this hull design has a large following among do-it-yourself Grand Canyon river runners due to its ease of rowing. Either hull design, when decked for dry storage of gear on the whitewater run through Grand Canyon, is known as a Grand Canyon dory.

== See also ==
- Cajune Boats

== Bibliography ==
- Fletcher, Roger (2007). Drift Boats & River Dories-Their History, Design, Construction and Use. Mechanicsburg, PA: Stackpole Books. ISBN 978-0-8117-0234-8.
- Martin, Tom (2012). Big Water, Little Boats-Moulty Fulmer and the First Grand Canyon Dory on the Last of the Wild Colorado. Flagstaff, AZ: Vishnu Temple Press. ISBN 978-0-9795055-6-0.
- Streeks, Neale (1995). Drift Boat Fly Fishing-A River Guide's Sage Advice. Portland, OR: Frank Amato Publications. ISBN 1-57188-016-X.
