= Robert Brewster Stanton =

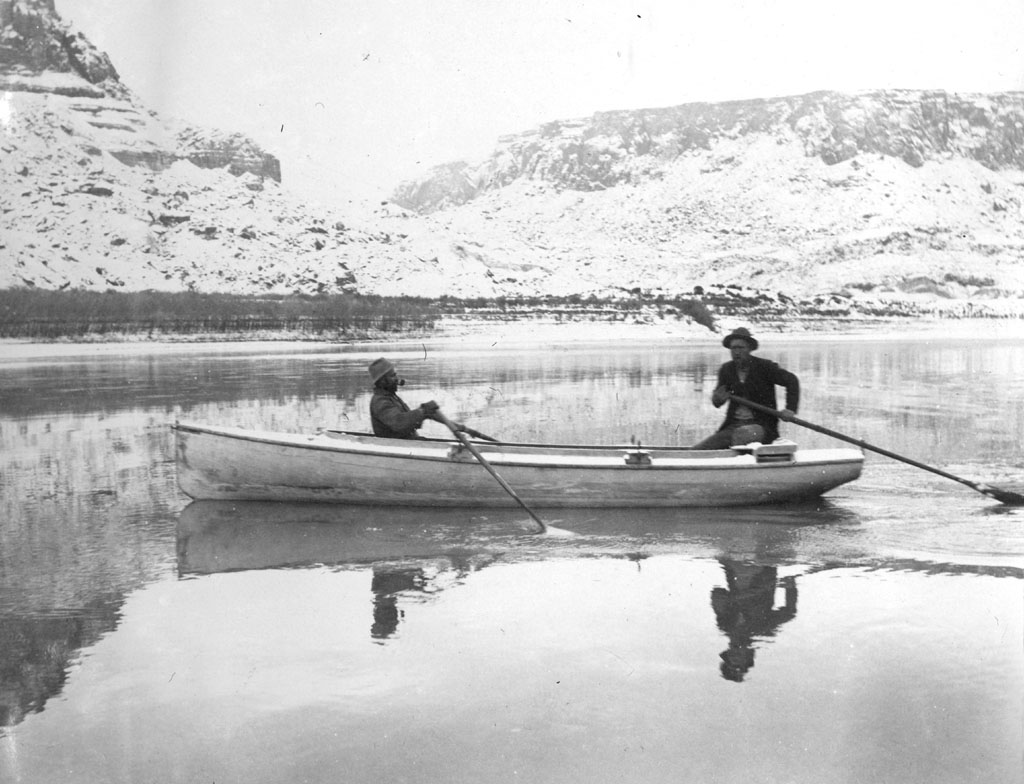
Robert Stanton rowing in Glen Canyon, December 1889. Grand Canyon National Park photo

Robert Brewster Stanton (5 August 1846, Woodville, Mississippi – 23 February 1922, New Canaan, Connecticut) was a United States civil and mining engineer. He was chief engineer of an expedition investigating the Grand Canyon for a possible railroad line in 1889–90, and investigated many mining properties.

== Biography ==
Stanton was educated at Miami University, where he received an A.B. in 1871 and an A.M. in 1878. He received an honorary A.M. from the University of Wooster in 1885.

=== Railroad work ===
Stanton was resident engineer of the Cincinnati Southern Railroad from 1874 to 1880, and as chief engineer for the Georgetown, Breckenridge, and Leadville Railroad, Stanton supervised the construction of the Georgetown Loop Railroad in the Colorado Rockies from 1881 to 1883. Beginning in 1884, he started a private practice as a consulting civil and mining engineer. Stanton's projects involving railroads included chief engineer for a photographic survey through the Grand Canyon of the Colorado River for the Denver, Colorado Canyon and Pacific Railroad Company in 1889–90. Stanton also did special work on the British Columbia landslides for the Canadian Pacific Railway in 1896, examination and appraisal of the value of railroads in the states of Michigan, Kansas and Washington in 1906 and 1910, location of railroad line from Chicago to Saint Louis in 1902, and from Butte, Montana, to Boise, Idaho, 1905.

=== Mining work ===
Stanton engaged in mining operations and explorations at various times from 1884 through World War I, throughout the United States, Canada, Mexico, the West Indies and the Dutch East Indies. He was engineer and general manager for the Flint Idaho Mining Company 1886–88. He filled the same role at the Hocumac Mining Company 1893–94. He did special work in copper and nickel mines in Canada in 1892 and 1903. He explored and examined gold mines in the Island of Sumatra 1904. He examined and reported on Cananea, Mexico, copper mines in 1906; gold mines in California in 1893, 1903 and 1907.

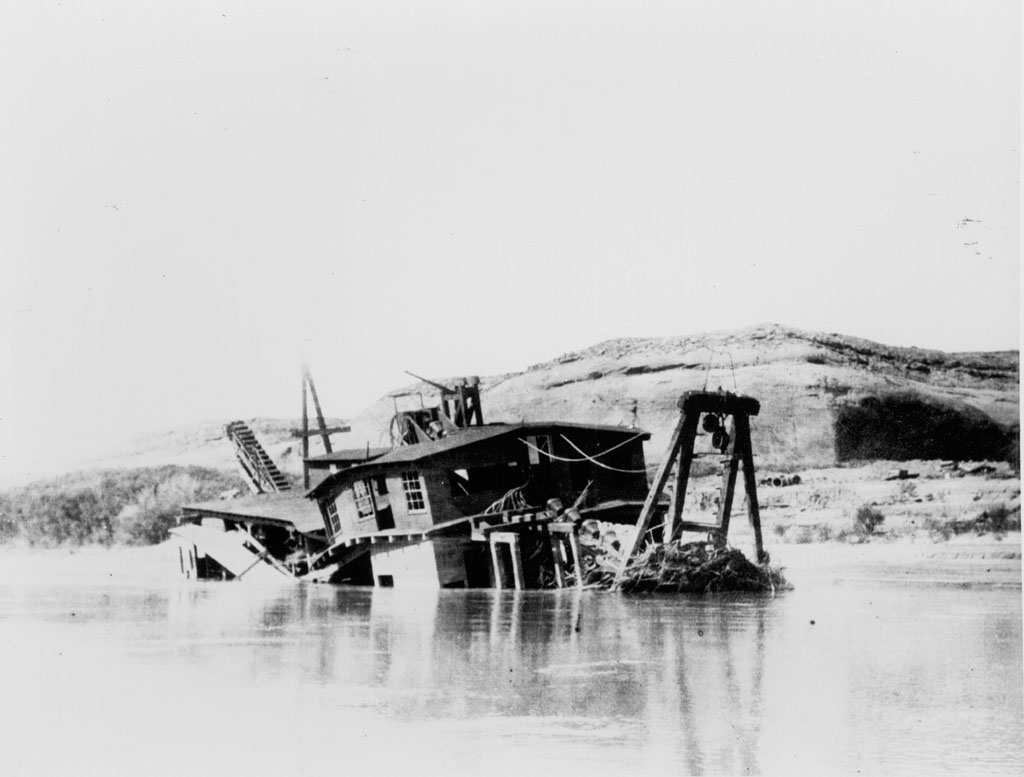
Abandoned Hoskinini Gold Dredge in Glen Canyon about 1908

Stanton also worked in Utah and Arizona in Glen Canyon during 1898-1901 where he worked for the Hoskininni Mining Company. The company, funded in part by Julius F. Stone, was a complete failure. Stanton also did engineering work at manganese mines in Washington in 1910; gold mines in Nova Scotia in 1913 and iron and manganese mines in Cuba from 1909 to 1914.

== Works ==
- Availability of the Cañons of the Colorado River for Railway Purposes (1882)
- The Great Landslides of the Canadian Pacific Railway (1898)
- monographs and lectures on the Grand Canyon

=== Posthumous ===
- James M. Chalfant, ed., Colorado River Controversies (New York: Dodd, Mead and Company, 1932)
- Dwight L. Smith, ed., Down the Colorado (Norman, Oklahoma: University of Oklahoma Press, 1965)
- C. Gregor Crampton and Dwight L. Smith, eds., The Hoskaninni Papers: Mining in Glen Canyon, 1897-1902 (Salt Lake City, University of Utah Press, 1961)
