= Glen Canyon Institute =

American conservation organization

Glen Canyon Institute is a non-profit organization founded in 1996 dedicated to the restoration of the Colorado River through Glen Canyon, which is currently covered by Lake Powell, a reservoir created by Glen Canyon Dam. Their headquarters are in Salt Lake City.

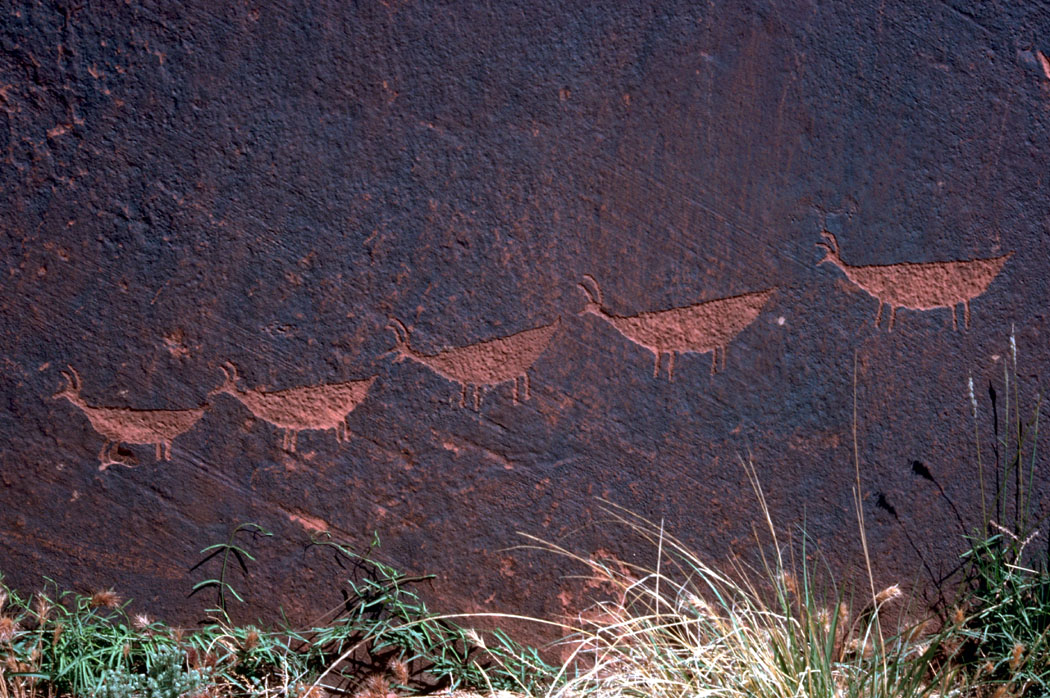
Petroglyphs in Glen Canyon

== History ==
Shortly after its founding, GCI commissioned eight studies on the effects of current Glen Canyon Dam operations as well as issues associated with restoring the canyon, compiling the results in the Citizen's Environmental Assessment. On this scientific basis, the institute dedicated itself to the decommissioning of Glen Canyon Dam. They met with little success, but established themselves as a credible organization calling for the end of Lake Powell, a cause which has grown in popularity in recent years. As the lake level has fallen drastically in the last five years because of drought, the institute has shifted more to protecting the revealed landscape, distributing educational materials, and calling the attention of the national press.

== Rationale ==
GCI maintains that the current protocols with regard to Lake Powell are environmentally damaging and wasteful. The group asserts that draining the reservoir would, among other things, save Lake Mead. According to GCI, Lake Powell currently loses up to 860,000 acre-feet (1.06 km^{3}) of water through evaporation and seepage each year which would otherwise be contained in Lake Mead, which currently has more than enough storage to contain the extra water. That water loss is equivalent to the entire annual consumption of Los Angeles.

== See also ==
- Grand Canyon
- Lake Powell
- David Brower
- Martin Litton
