= Glen Canyon =

Part of the Colorado River in Utah and Arizona, US

Coordinates: 37°15′15″N 110°52′42″W

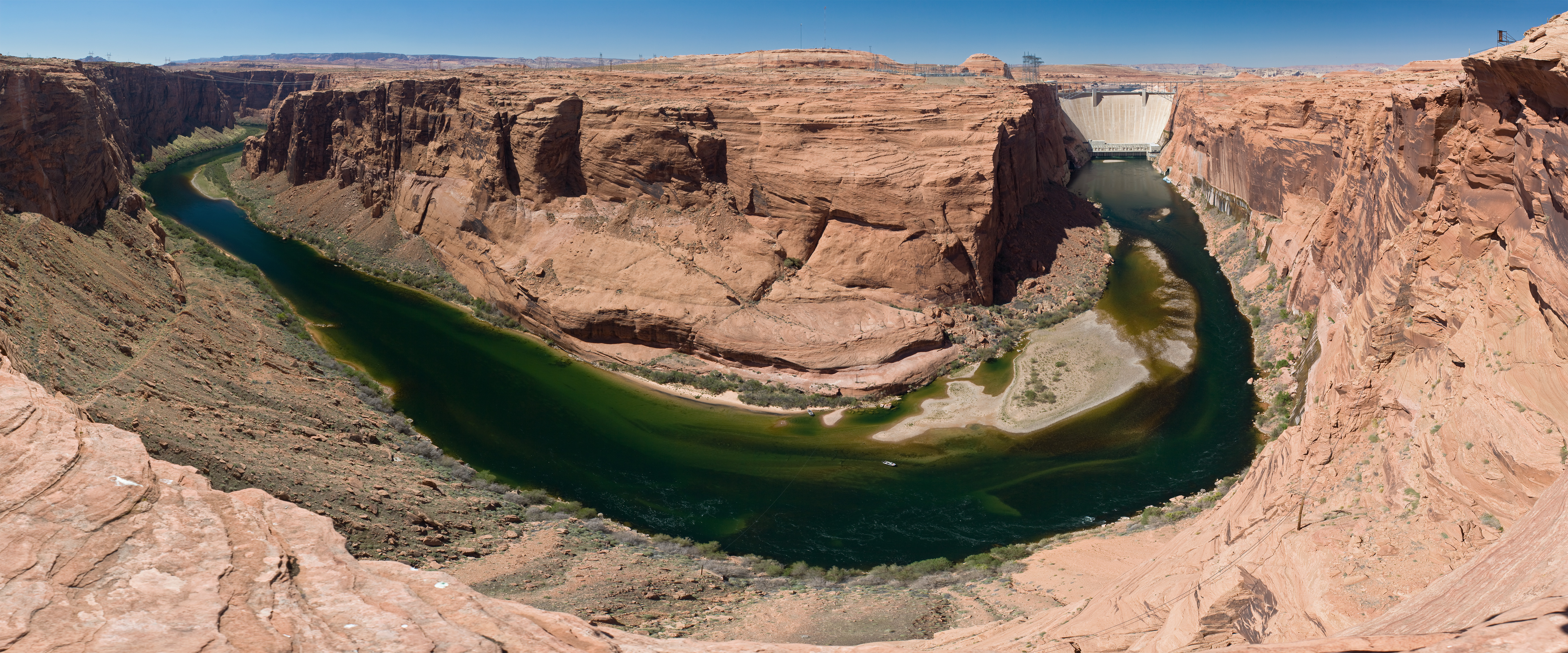
Glen Canyon

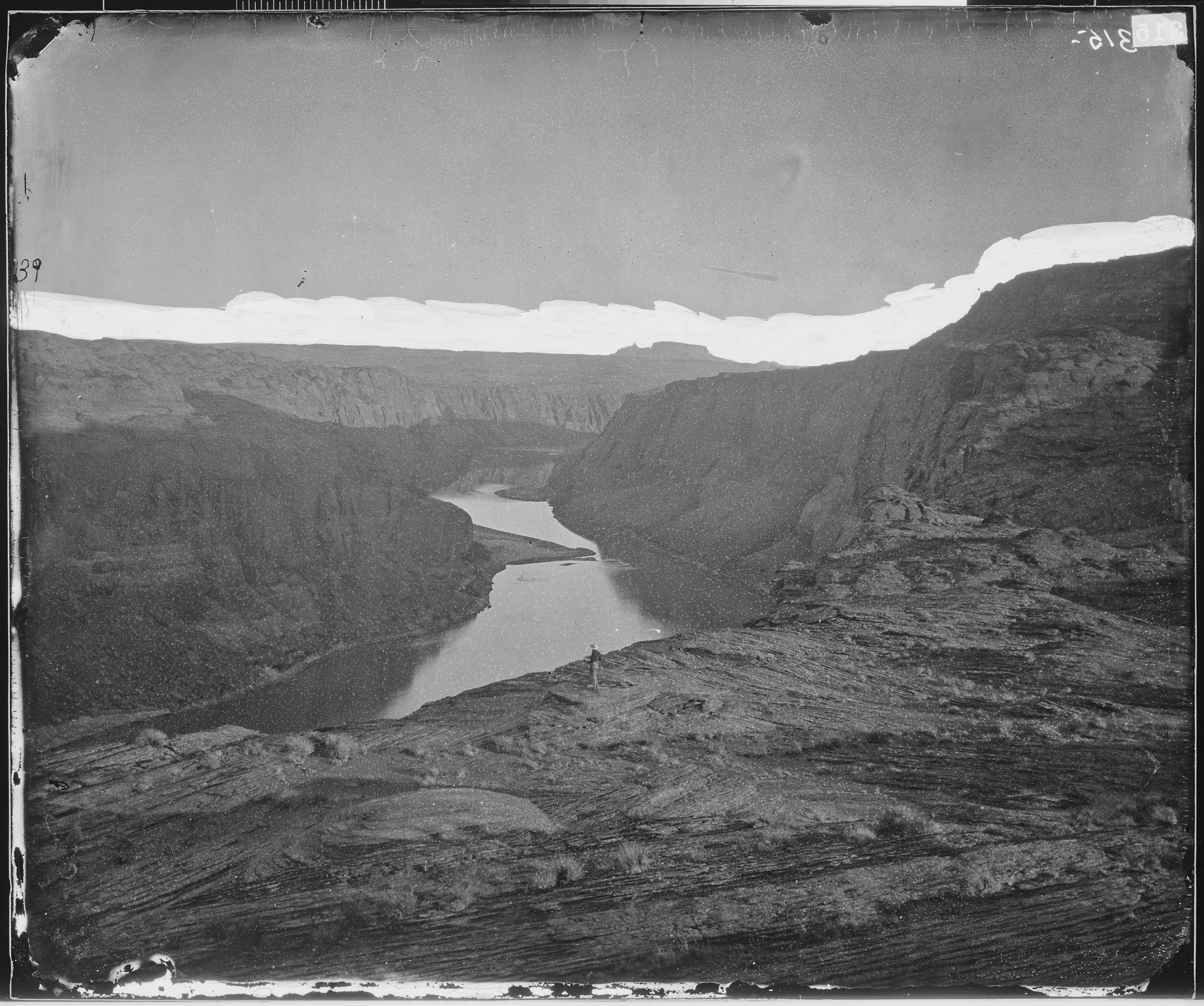
Glen Canyon in 1873, near the confluence of the Colorado and San Juan Rivers

Glen Canyon is a natural canyon carved by a 169.6-mile (272.9 km) length of the Colorado River, mostly in southeastern and south-central Utah, in the United States. Glen Canyon starts where Narrow Canyon ends, at the confluence of the Colorado River and the Dirty Devil River. A small part of the lower end of Glen Canyon extends into northern Arizona and terminates at Lee's Ferry, near the Vermilion Cliffs. Like the Grand Canyon farther downstream, Glen Canyon is part of the immense system of canyons carved by the Colorado River and its tributaries.

In 1963, a reservoir, Lake Powell, was created by the construction of the Glen Canyon Dam, in the Arizona portion of Glen Canyon near the brand new town of Page, inundating much of Glen Canyon under water hundreds of feet in depth. Contrary to popular belief, Lake Powell was not the result of negotiations over the controversial damming of the Green River within Dinosaur National Monument at Echo Park; the Echo Park Dam proposal was abandoned due to nationwide citizen pressure on Congress to do so. The Glen Canyon Dam remains a central issue for modern environmentalist movements. Beginning in the late 1990s, the Sierra Club and other organizations renewed the call to dismantle the dam and drain Lake Powell in Lower Glen Canyon. Today, Glen Canyon and Lake Powell are managed by the U.S. Department of the Interior within Glen Canyon National Recreation Area.

== Before the Glen Canyon Dam ==
=== Prehistoric cultural periods ===
Studies indicate a chronology for the Lower Glen Canyon prehistory, "from pre-A.D. 1 to the 15th century and recorded history from 1776 to the present".

- A Late Basketmaker II Era (generally AD 50–500) is represented by several sites. Radiocarbon dates from charcoal material span the period between AD 250 and 440 (plus or minus 80 years). Basketmaker III is not found in the Lower Glen Canyon, but is documented in Navajo Canyon, a large left bank tributary of the Colorado River, within the geographical area of the Lower Glen Canyon. Basketmaker III introduced fired pottery, mostly Lino Black-on-gray and Lino Gray, and some small amounts of Lino Fugitive Red and Obelisk Gray. The Basketmaker culture is believed to have lasted later than Pueblo I.
- Pueblo I Era (AD 750–900) remains are found at Rock Creek in Lower Glen Canyon, and in Navajo Canyon. The pottery types are Kana-a Black-on-white, Deadmans Black-on-red, and Kana-a Gray, made from deposits found in Lizard Alcove. Pueblo I is the best documented period of Navajo Canyon, beginning in AD 800 and lasting 200 years. "Pueblo II in Navajo Canyon is represented by the absence of Kana-a Black-on-white and the dominance of Black Mesa Black-on-white".
- Pueblo II (AD 900–1100) and early Pueblo III is the best documented cultural area in Lower Glen Canyon, corresponding with habitation on Cummings Mesa. Pottery includes mostly Tusayan varieties, Black-on-white, Black-on-red, and Red Wear Polychromes.
- Hopi people from the Jeddito area came into the canyons in the 14th century, represented by Yellow Wares, mostly Jeddito Black-on-yellow, and Jeddito plain.

Most of the ceramic material found in the main canyon was probably made in the highlands, although it is possible some pottery was manufactured in Lower Glen Canyon. Clay deposits are found along the river, and some crude pottery specimens may have been made there. Only four burials were found in Lower Glen Canyon at three sites. Trash dumps are not very common at most sites. This is more evidence to suggest the seasonal rather than permanent occupation of hunters and farmers in the canyon.

Cultural similarities are based on the presence or absence of certain types of ceramic wares. Group types of pottery, including Kayenta (Tusayan and Tsegi Orange Ware), Virgin (San Juan Red and White Wares), with Fremont, and Mesa Verde or Anasazi types of White and Desert Gray Ware, were found mostly on the right bank of the Colorado. Basketmaker II is characterized by a lack of pottery, as well as above-ground and underground cists lined with slabs.

There is very little evidence of permanent occupation except at Talus Ruin, a small pueblo with a kiva, a ceremonial structure, made mostly of masonry, featuring jacal walls of sticks and reeds set in mortar in a single row of masonry. The presence of metates are evidence that campsites with slab-lined hearths were inhabited for longer periods. Agricultural structures are not found in the main lower canyon, and no formalized fields are found in the main canyon because of alleviation and slope wash burying. Houses, when found, are mostly sandstone slab with mortar, having one to seven rooms. "Well constructed mealing bins which usually denote permanency were lacking in the Lower Glen Canyon. In contrast, on Cummings Mesa at Surprise Pueblo, there was one entire room devoted to mealing bins…". In the highlands, granaries were near or incorporated into permanent pueblos, compared with smaller ones near temporary sites in the canyon. "Home Base" pueblos in the nearby highlands on Cummings Mesa and Paiute Mesa are believed to have supported temporary farming and hunting parties, who used an extensive trail system in the main canyon which is still in use today.

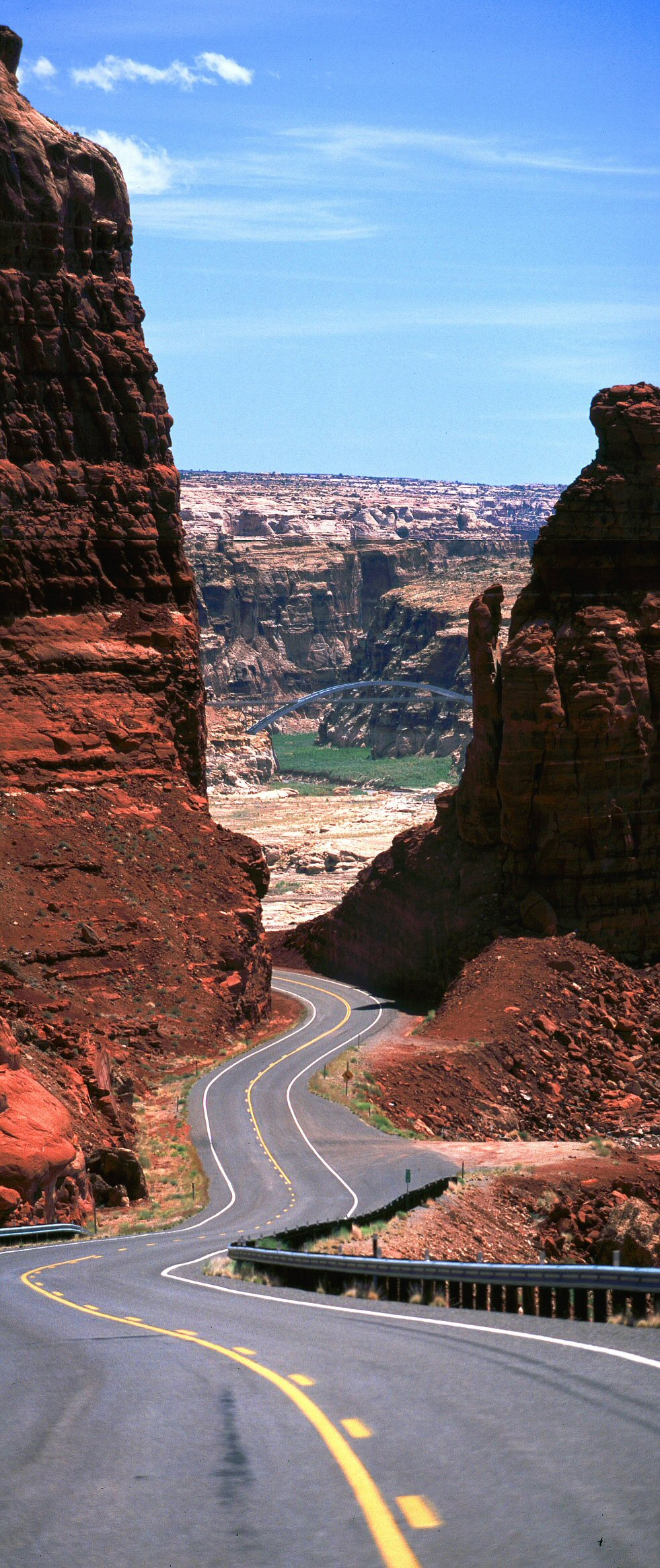
Hite Crossing Bridge of State Route 95 at Glen Canyon

=== Natural resources for tool-making ===
"Stone tool manufacturing appears to have been an important industry for the entire Glen Canyon region, perhaps one of the major reasons for occupation". Cryptocrystalline rocks fill the Pleistocene gravel beds on the Carmel platforms. Scattered lithic tools and materials indicate workshops of various sizes. There is a lack of siliceous material in the highlands, but tools are found there made from the gravel beds in the river.

There are very few ground stone artifacts, such as manos, metates, and scrapers, found in the main canyon, since these tools are mainly found in the highlands. In the main canyon, a large number of chipped implements, ranging from small arrowheads to large knives, are found. Finished tools, and possibly blanks taken to the mesa, were probably used for trade.

=== Archaeology ===
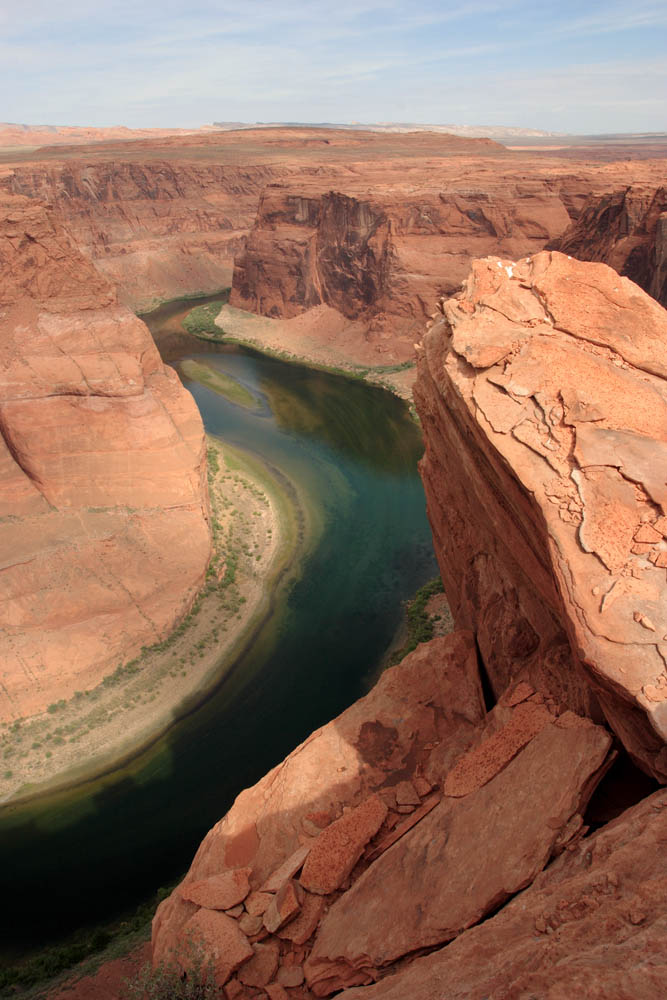
Glen Canyon below Glen Canyon Dam

Around 1956, archaeologists and biologists from the University of Utah and the Museum of Northern Arizona including Gene Field Foster, using National Park research grants, planned an emergency survey of Glen Canyon, which was soon to be flooded by the new Glen Canyon Dam. Between 1958 and 1960, four investigative phases, combined with other surveys prior to 1957, discovered 250 archaeological sites within the canyon. The Lower Glen Canyon survey was completed in 1958.

==== Excavations ====
Excavations began during the summer of 1958 on 16 sites. A thesis emerged that prehistoric people living permanently on the highlands south of Glen Canyon and on the Cummings Mesa, farmed the Lower Glen Canyon on a seasonal basis, and gathered raw materials. To prove this thesis of seasonal habitation, criteria such as architectural units, locations of trail systems, occurrence of ceremonial structures, prevalence of burials, and position of natural and cultural strata were investigated. Four types of sites are described in the survey, classified as either open sites situated on rock terraces; talus sites on broken material below cliffs; shelter sites in protected areas under overhanging cliffs; and cliff sites beneath ledges or in caves and canyon walls. Open sites are the majority on both sides of the river. The majority of sites, mostly Navajo camps, feature lithic garbage or ceramics, or both. Talus sites are rarely recorded.

Most of the cultural remains found are chipped stone tools (lithic materials), including projectile points, scrapers, drills, knives, choppers, and ground stone tools and manos (grinders). The collection of sherds are mostly Tusayan Gray Ware and Tusayan White Ware. Petroglyph panels are found throughout Glen Canyon. "Pecked and incised figures depict mountain sheep, human figures, birds, human handprints and animal tracks. Geometric figures range from circles and spirals to highly complex rectilinear patterns. The human figures have triangular bodies. Painted figures have been reported for both sides of the river.... Petroglyph panels of such quality are lacking from the highland regions adjacent to Glen Canyon".

=== Historic period ===
The recorded history of the canyon begins with the Dominguez–Escalante expedition in 1776, during which Spanish explorers first documented the existence of Glen Canyon. The expedition members crossed the Colorado River in Glen Canyon at the site now known as the Crossing of the Fathers.

In the 1830s, trapper Denis Julien may have visited upper Glen Canyon by boat. In 1869 and again in 1871, scientific expeditions led by John Wesley Powell traveled through Glen Canyon en route to the Grand Canyon, resulting in the first formal surveys of the main channel and many of the side canyons.

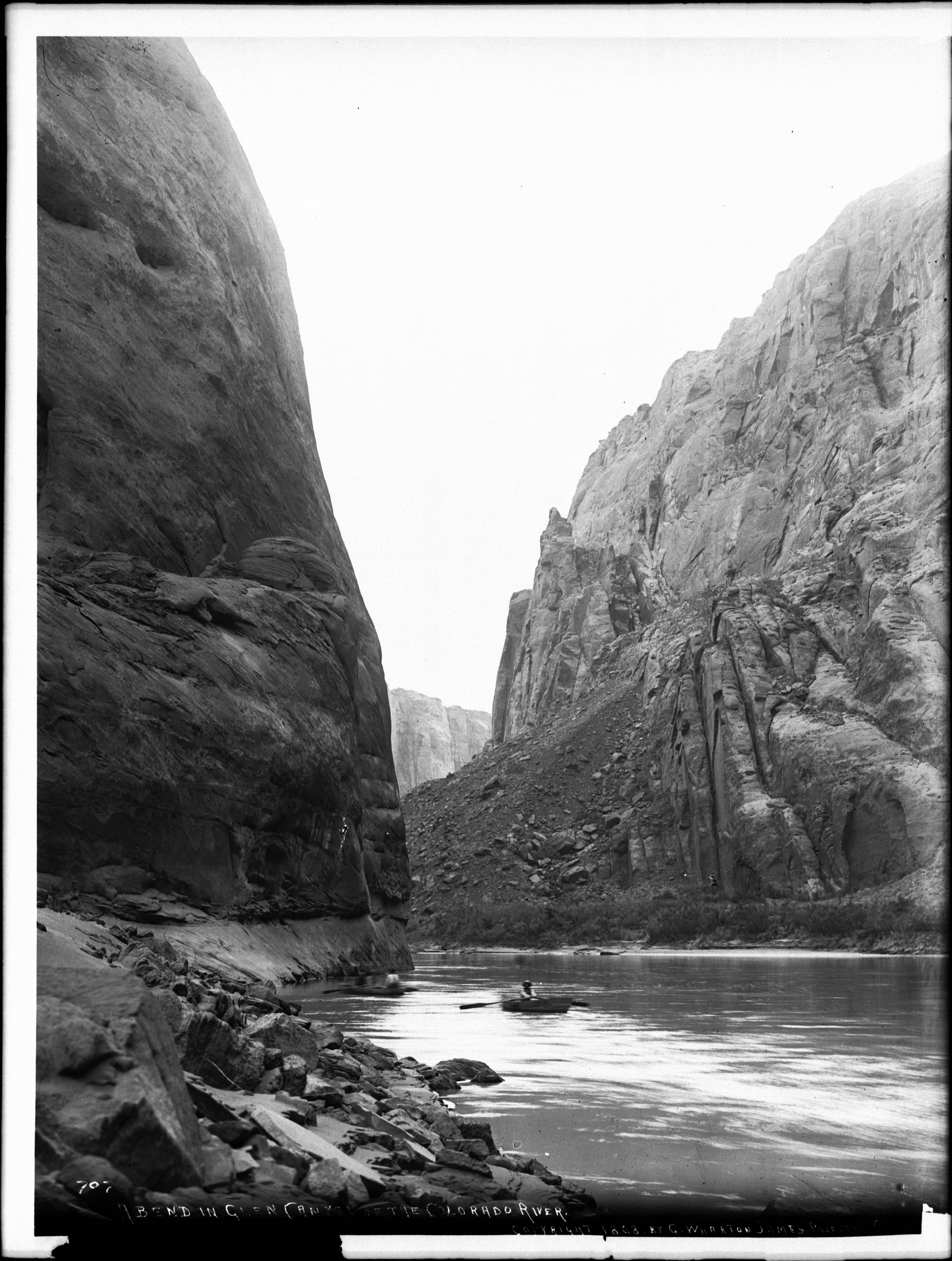
A bend in Glen Canyon of the Colorado River, Grand Canyon, c. 1898

In the 1890s, hundreds of miners panned for flour gold in Glen Canyon. Their main camp was at Dandy Crossing, also called Hite, Utah, after Cass Hite. Between 1898 and 1901, mining engineer Robert Brewster Stanton was employed by mining magnate Julius Stone to design, build, and operate a dredge in an attempt to recover Glen Canyon's flour gold. The effort failed.

=== Geographical and cultural features ===
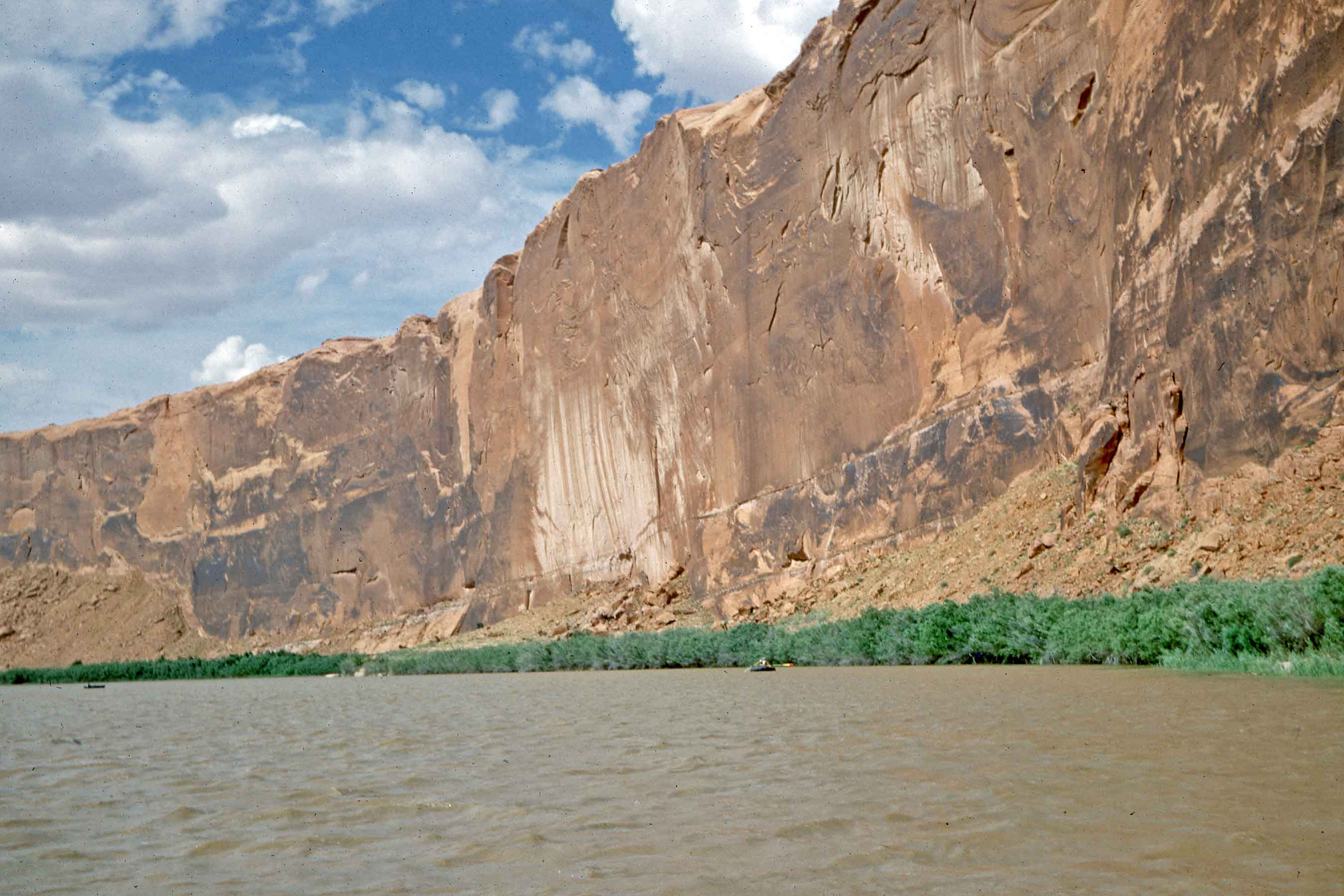
Tapestry Wall in Glen Canyon

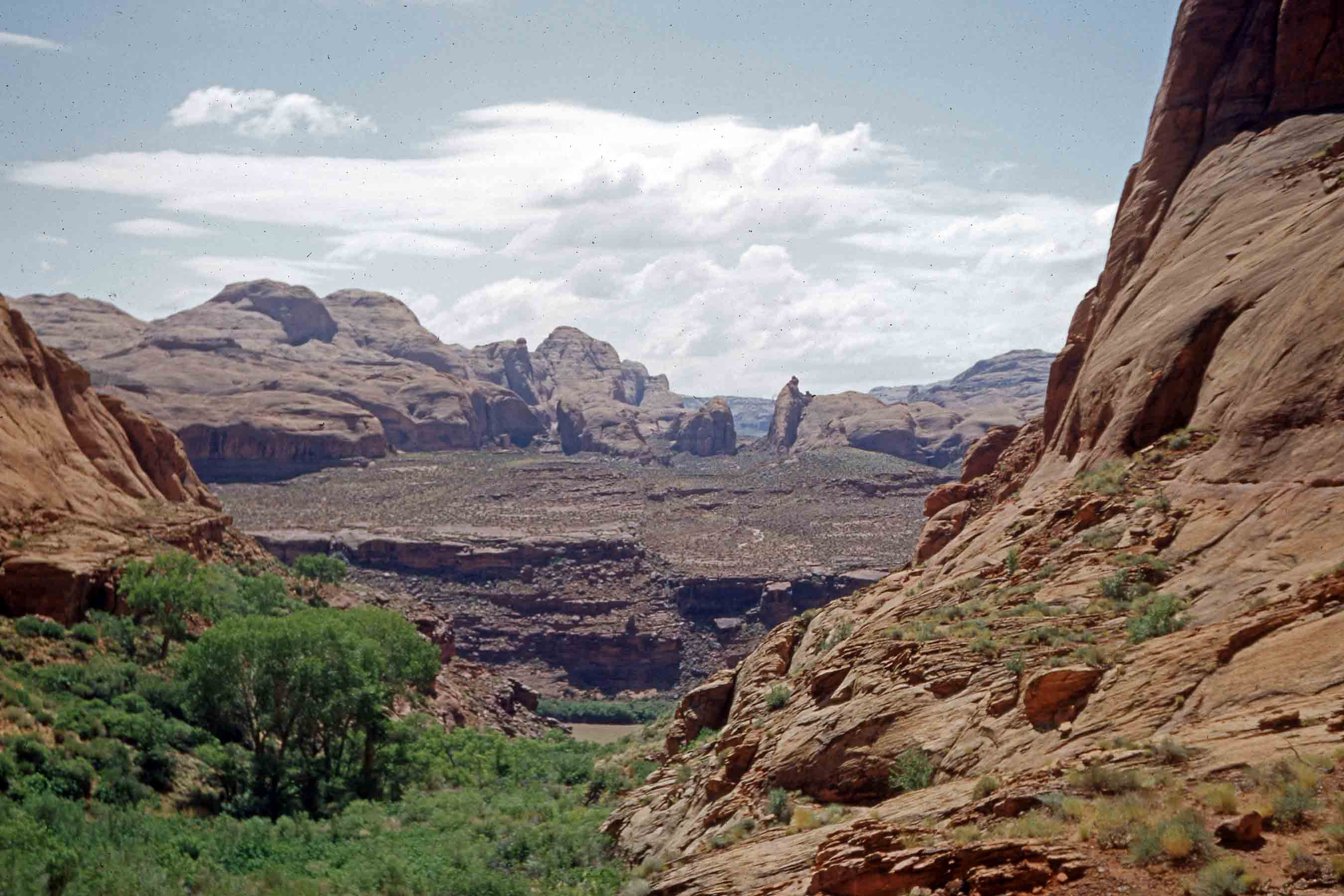
Hole in the Rock, Mile 84.4

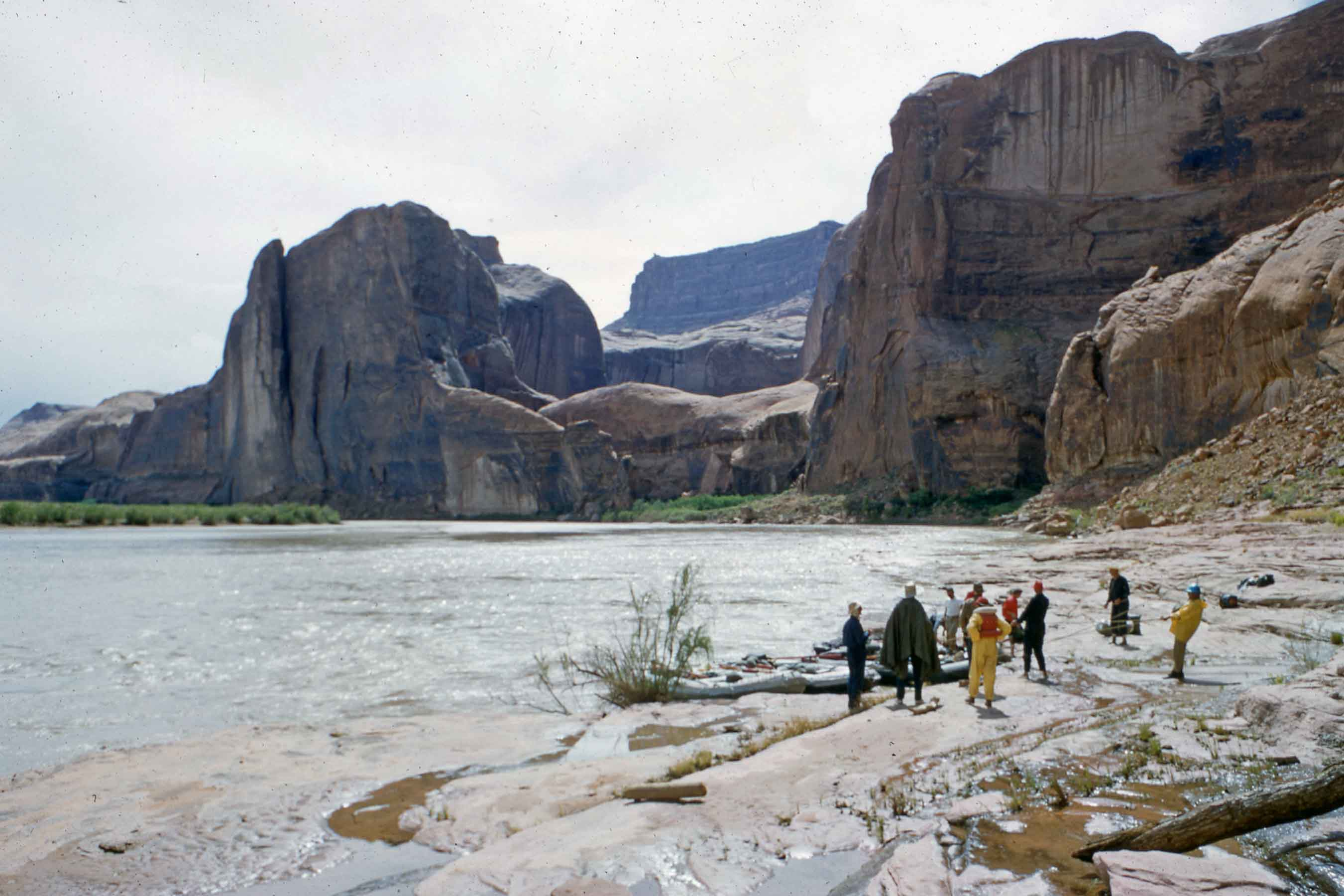
Hidden Passage Canyon, Mile 76.1

The following is a list of geographical and cultural features along the Colorado River in Glen Canyon. Many of these locations are now partially or entirely submerged beneath the waters of Lake Powell. River mileage is derived from the USGS 1921 Plan and Profile maps. River Mile Zero is at Lee's Ferry, Arizona; the numbers increase as one travels upstream, ending at Mile 169.6 at the confluence with the Dirty Devil River.

River Mile	Points of Interest
169.6 Right	Dirty Devil River confluence
162.9 Left	White Canyon and White Canyon Uranium Mill
162.3	Hite Ferry (Chaffin Ferry, Chaffin Ranch, Dandy Crossing) and Hite Crossing Bridge
150.1 Left	Red Canyon and Bert Loper Cabin (The Hermitage) and Blue Notch Canyon
148.4 Right	Ticaboo Creek and Cass Hite grave
136.2 Right	Tapestry Wall (136.3–135.4)
132.1 Right	Smith Fork
121.5 Right	Robert Brewster Stanton Dredge
120.5 Right	Bullfrog Creek and Bullfrog Rapid, Bullfrog Marina
119.0	Halls Crossing, Utah
88.25 Right	Escalante River confluence
84.4 Right	Hole in the Rock crossing and Hole in the Rock Trail
78.0 Left	San Juan River confluence
76.1 Right	Hidden Passage (alt name Narrow Canyon)
75.8 Left	Music Temple
68.6 Left	Forbidden Canyon, Aztec Creek and Rainbow Bridge Canyon, Rainbow Bridge National Monument
39.9 Right	Padre Creek, Crossing of the Fathers
19.7 Left	Antelope Creek and Antelope Canyon
15.5	Glen Canyon Dam
0.0	Lee's Ferry

== Glen Canyon Dam ==
In the 1950s, with the proposal of a dam upstream of the Grand Canyon for water storage and hydroelectric power generation, many environmentalist groups rallied to prevent the inundation of the largely undeveloped canyons in the upper Colorado River watershed. The Sierra Club and many other conservation organizations were instrumental in blocking the proposed Echo Park Dam in Dinosaur National Monument. While Flaming Gorge Dam was built as an alternative to the proposed Echo Park and Split Mountain dams within Dinosaur National Monument, Glen Canyon lacked any protection as either a National Park or Monument. Without that protection, Glen Canyon Dam was authorized and constructed. In 1962, the Sierra Club's David Brower and many others floated the Colorado River through the canyon and realized the tremendous resource it was. The experience transformed Brower's attitude towards environmental preservation, making him more radical and less likely to compromise. His experience has been compared to the experience of John Muir with the Hetch Hetchy Reservoir in California. For Brower, it steeled him for the 1960s battle over the proposed Marble Canyon Dam in the Grand Canyon.

American writer Edward Abbey also documented his experience exploring Glen Canyon from the Colorado River prior to the completion of Glen Canyon Dam in his 1968 memoir Desert Solitaire, in the chapter titled "Down the River".

== See also ==
- Glen Canyon National Recreation Area
- Glen Canyon Institute
