= Cajune Boats =

Custom manufacturer of wooden drift boats in Montana

Cajune Boats is a custom manufacturer of wooden drift boats in Montana. It was established as Montana Boatbuilders in 1996 in Whitefish, Montana. The business is owned by Jason Cajune and the paddle fishing boats, including the Kingfisher, are produced near the Yellowstone River. Fiberglass, epoxy and modern technology are incorporated into the boat designs.

The riverboats are produced in a style known as McKenzie, a traditional wooden dory design that originated circa 300 A.D. "for surf and inshore fishing boats on the Arabian Sea". They are flat bottomed and manage a heavy load well. They are made for rough water and rapids. Pat Barnes is credited with bringing them to Montana around 1950.

Cajune studied architecture, engineering, and filmed media at Montana State University in Bozeman before departing to work as a boat builder in Washington state. He returned to Montana in 1996 with his wife and established Montana Boatbuilders. The business builds about 20-24 boats a year, and waits for new orders can be up to two years. The business also performs repairs on boats made of materials other than aluminum.
