= Boundary Butte (Rainbow Plateau) =

Butte on the Rainbow Plateau in San Juan County, Utah, United States

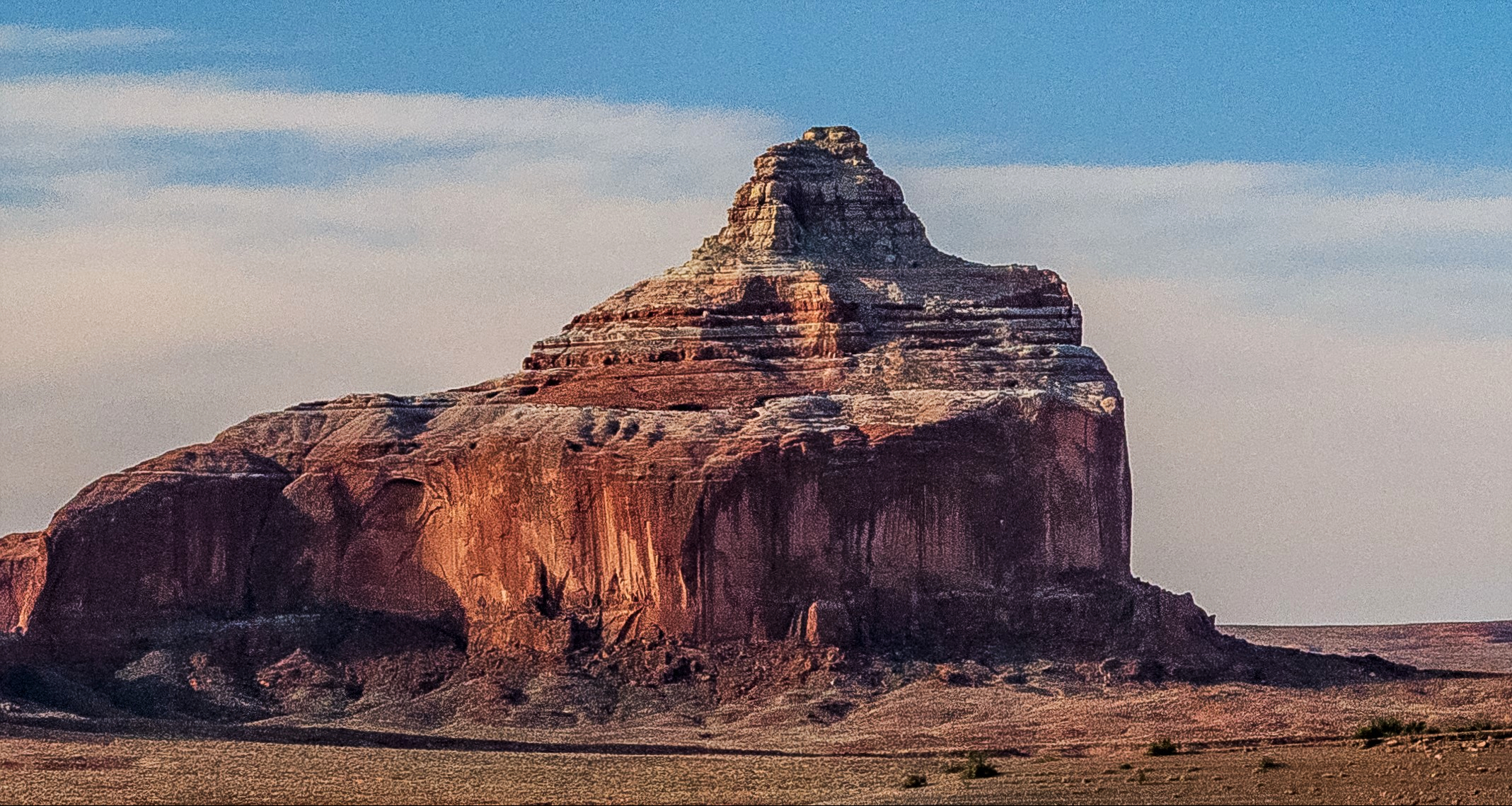
- Northwest aspect

Highest point
- Elevation: 4,934 ft (1,504 m)
- Prominence: 897 ft (273 m)
- Parent peak: Tower Butte
- Isolation: 2.58 mi (4.15 km)
- Coordinates: 37°00′05″N 111°17′13″W

Geography
- Location within Utah Location within the United States
- Location: Navajo Reservation; San Juan County, Utah, U.S.
- Parent range: Colorado Plateau
- Topo map: USGS Gunsight Butte

Geology
- Rock age: Jurassic
- Rock type: Entrada Sandstone

Climbing
- Easiest route: class 5.x climbing

Boundary Butte is a 4,934-foot (1,504 meter) elevation sandstone summit located south of Lake Powell, in extreme southwestern San Juan County, Utah, United States, just north of the Arizona border. It is situated on Navajo Nation land, 11.5 miles (18.5 km) northeast of the town of Page, and towers 1,200 feet above the lake as a landmark of the area. It lies on the Utah-Arizona border, hence its name.

== Geology ==
Boundary Butte is a butte composed primarily of Entrada Sandstone, similar to Dominguez Butte 2.5 miles (4.0 km) to the north, and Tower Butte 2.6 miles (4.2 km) to the southwest. The Entrada Sandstone overlays Carmel Formation, and below that Page Sandstone at lake level. Above the Entrada layers is Romana Sandstone capped by Morrison Formation. It is located in the southern edge of the Great Basin Desert on the Colorado Plateau. Precipitation runoff from this feature drains into the Colorado River watershed.

== Gallery ==
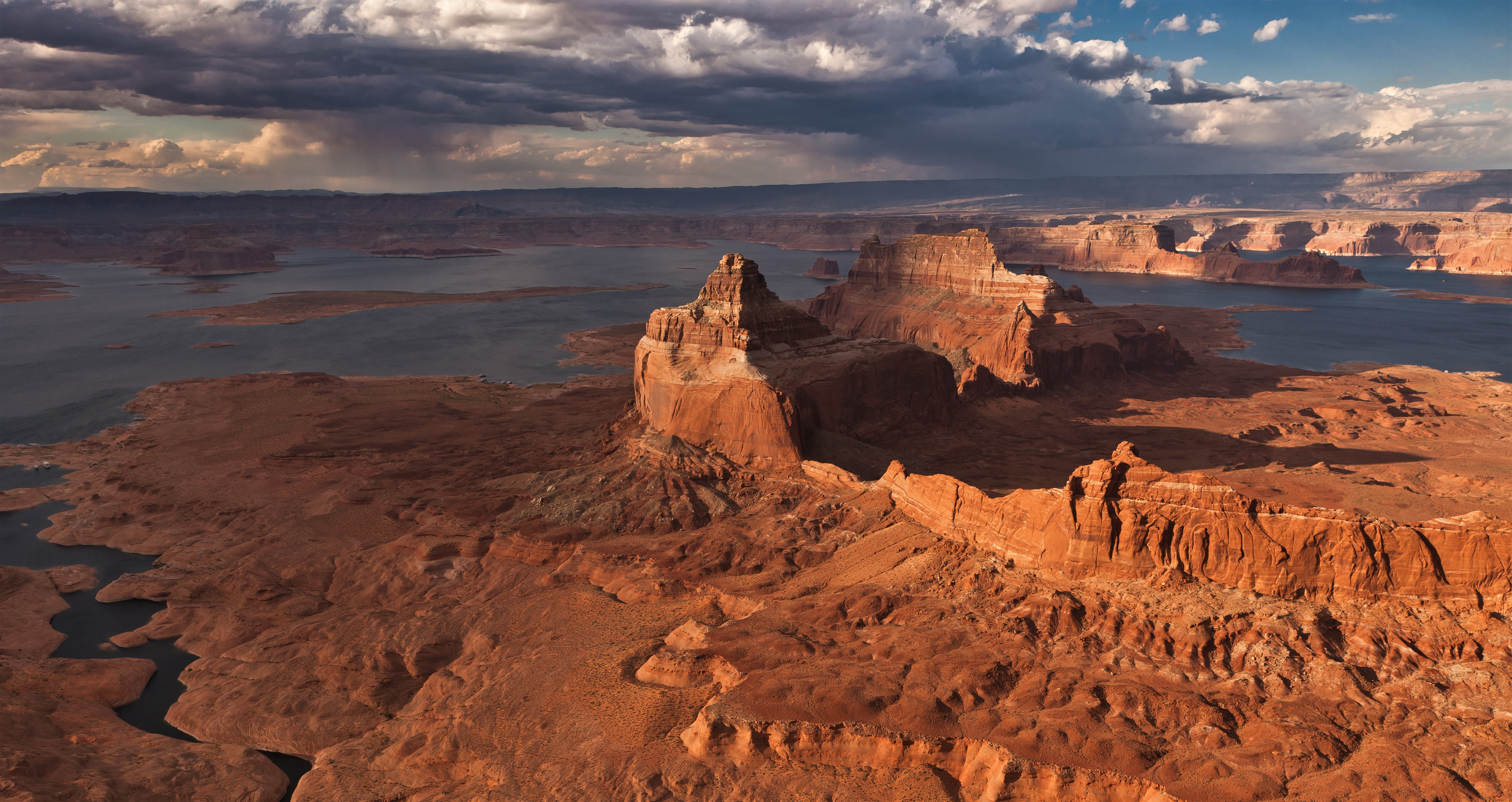
Aerial view looking north, with Boundary Butte centered

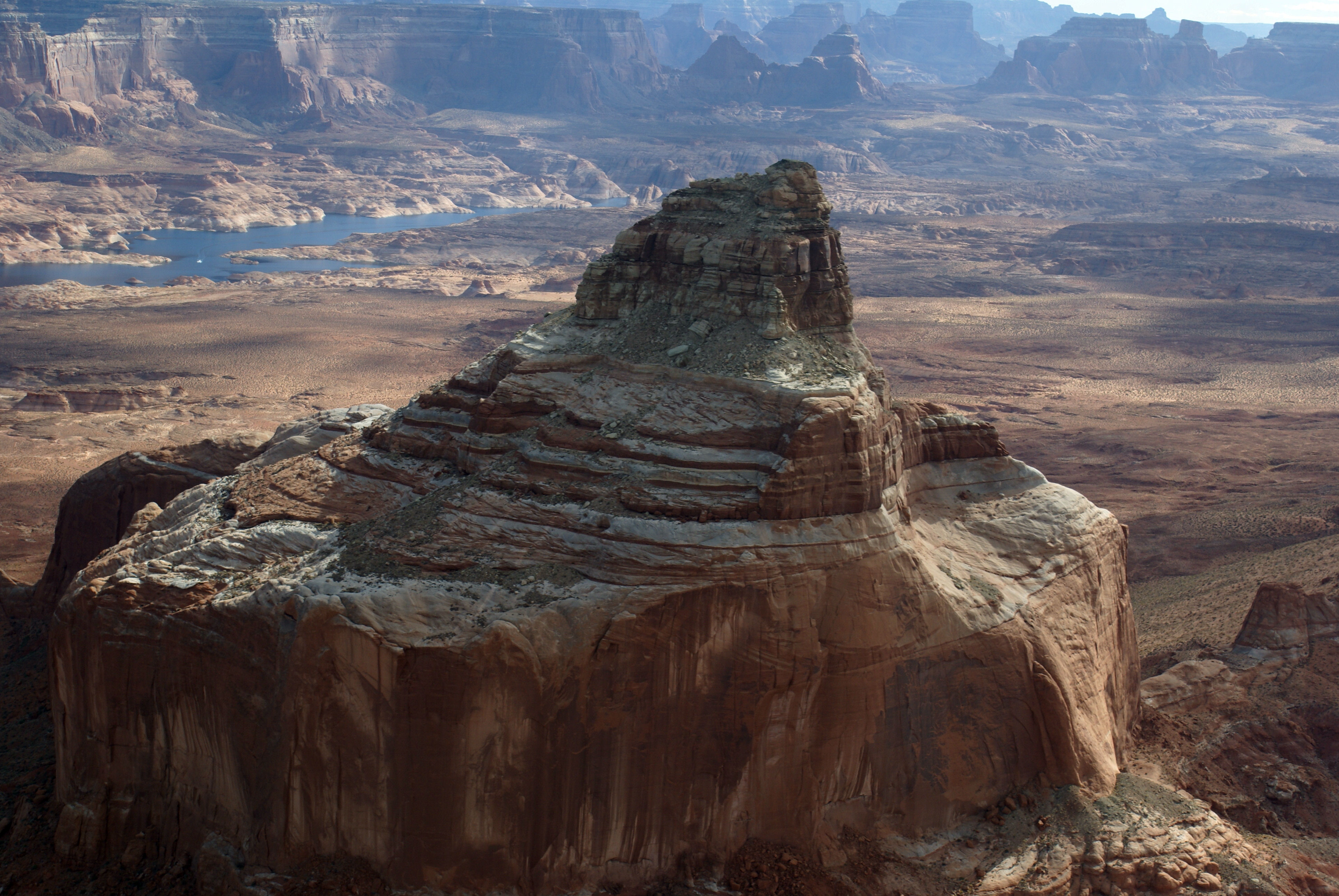
Aerial view of west aspect

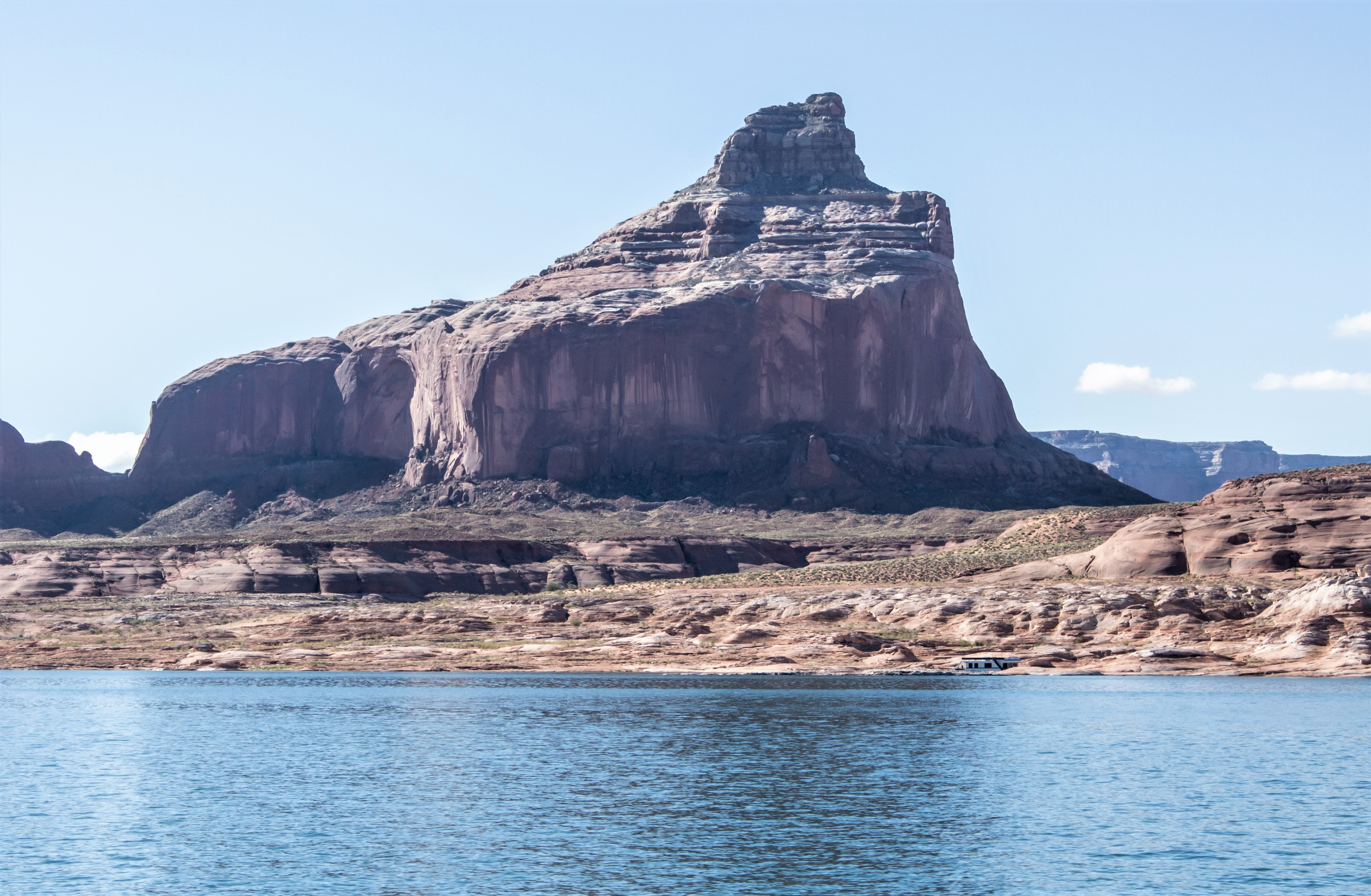
From northwest

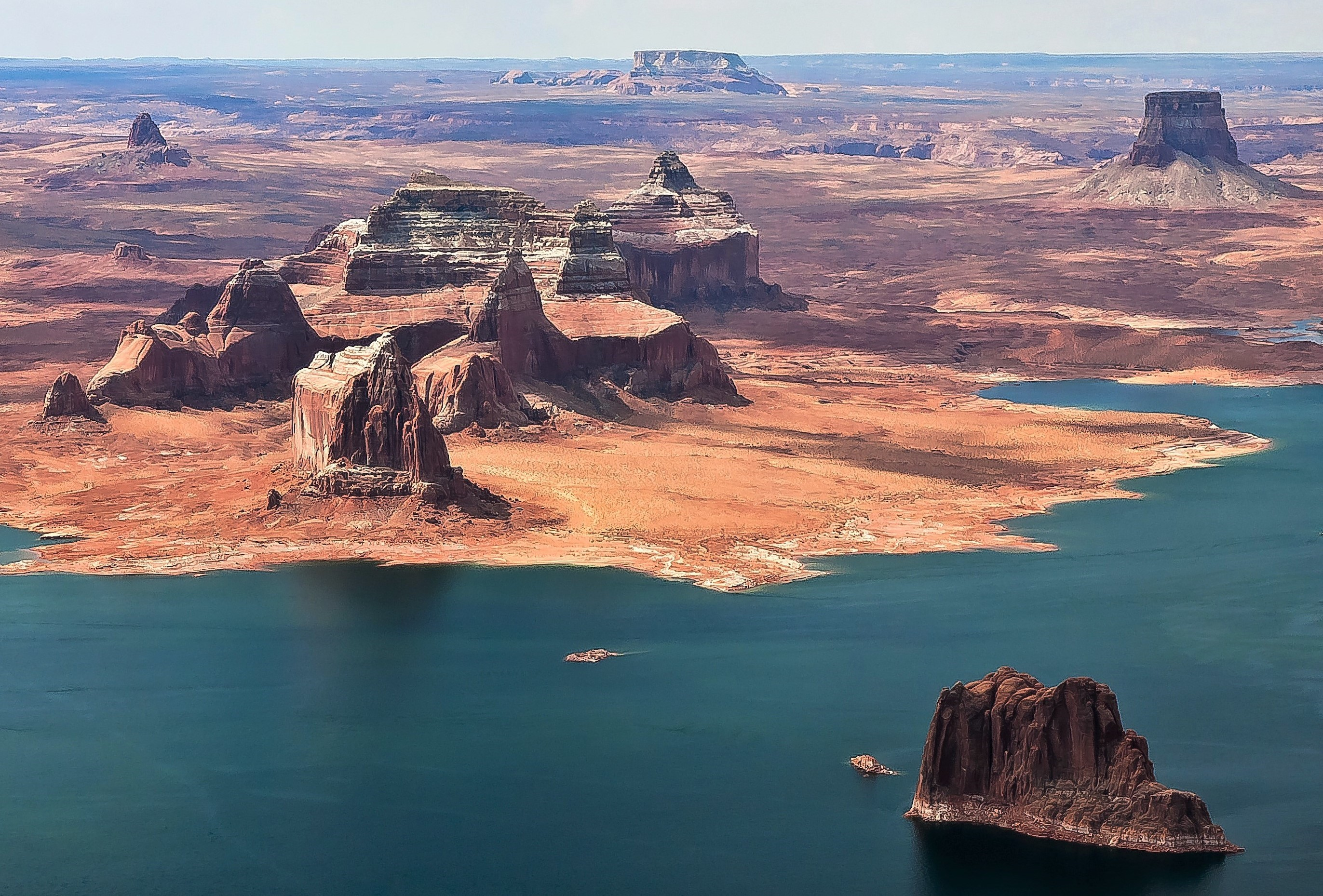
Aerial view looking south. Dominguez Butte left of center, nearest to water's edge.
Boundary Butte behind right. (Tower Butte upper right corner. Padres Butte in lower right corner. LeChee Rock centered on horizon)

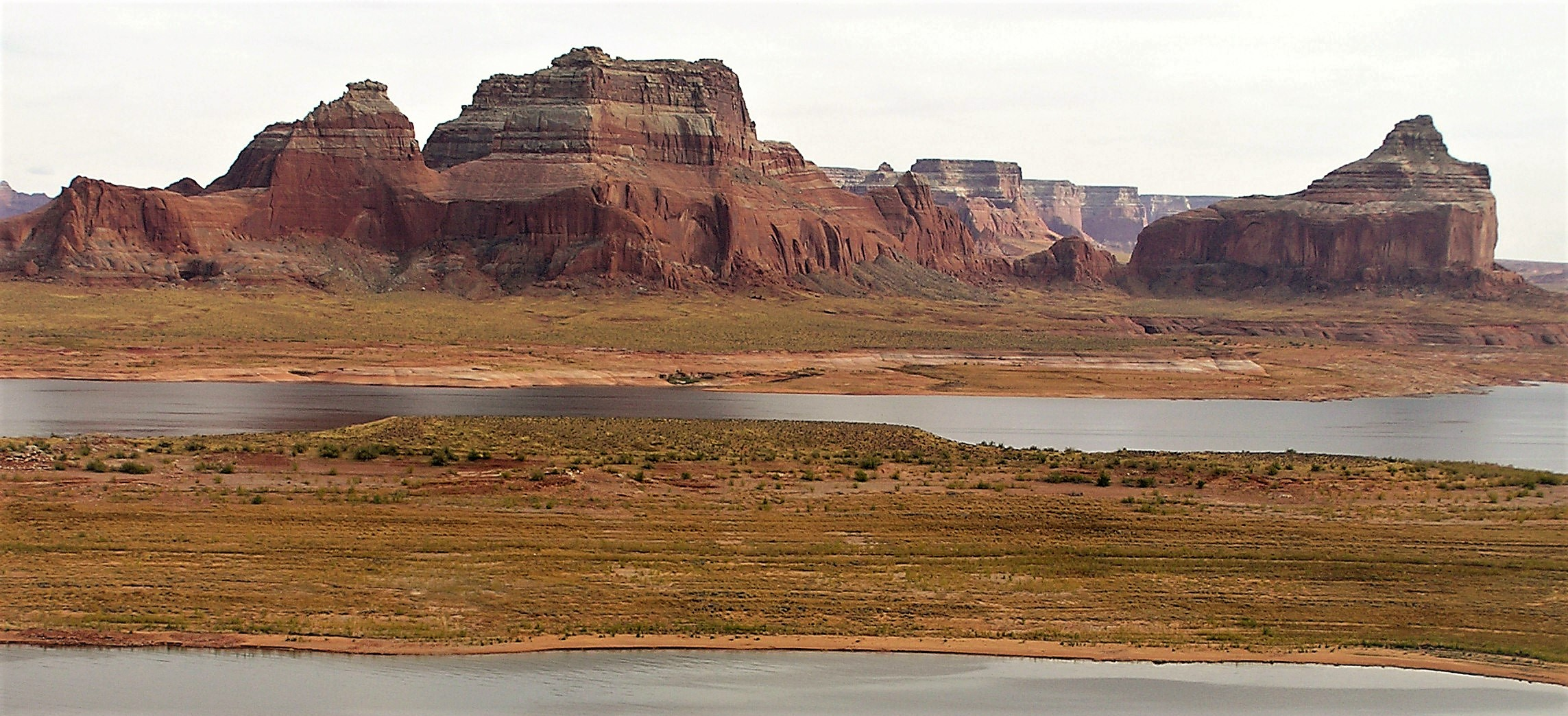
Boundary Butte to the right

== Climate ==
According to the Köppen climate classification system, Boundary Butte is located in an arid climate zone with hot, very dry summers, and chilly winters with very little snow. Spring and fall are the most favorable seasons to visit.

Climate data for Page, Arizona
Month	Jan	Feb	Mar	Apr	May	Jun	Jul	Aug	Sep	Oct	Nov	Dec	Year
Record high °F (°C)	64 (18)	72 (22)	82 (28)	91 (33)	102 (39)	107 (42)	109 (43)	106 (41)	100 (38)	93 (34)	77 (25)	66 (19)	109 (43)
Mean daily maximum °F (°C)	43.1 (6.2)	50.3 (10.2)	59.5 (15.3)	68.5 (20.3)	78.5 (25.8)	90.2 (32.3)	95.1 (35.1)	92.0 (33.3)	83.5 (28.6)	69.7 (20.9)	53.8 (12.1)	43.7 (6.5)	69.0 (20.6)
Mean daily minimum °F (°C)	26.3 (−3.2)	30.4 (−0.9)	37.0 (2.8)	43.6 (6.4)	52.6 (11.4)	62.3 (16.8)	68.3 (20.2)	66.4 (19.1)	58.4 (14.7)	46.6 (8.1)	34.7 (1.5)	27.1 (−2.7)	46.1 (7.8)
Record low °F (°C)	−11 (−24)	6 (−14)	18 (−8)	25 (−4)	31 (−1)	44 (7)	56 (13)	46 (8)	40 (4)	24 (−4)	16 (−9)	1 (−17)	−11 (−24)
Average precipitation inches (mm)	0.61 (15)	0.48 (12)	0.65 (17)	0.50 (13)	0.40 (10)	0.14 (3.6)	0.58 (15)	0.69 (18)	0.66 (17)	0.99 (25)	0.56 (14)	0.48 (12)	6.74 (171.6)
Average snowfall inches (cm)	2.1 (5.3)	1.2 (3.0)	0.2 (0.51)	0 (0)	0 (0)	0 (0)	0 (0)	0 (0)	0 (0)	0 (0)	0.5 (1.3)	1.4 (3.6)	5.4 (13.71)
Average precipitation days (≥ 0.01 in)	4.5	4.0	5.2	3.5	3.2	1.7	4.6	5.2	4.5	4.3	3.2	3.9	47.8
Average snowy days (≥ 0.1 in)	0.9	0.6	0.3	0	0	0	0	0	0	0	0.2	0.6	2.6
Source: NOAA

== See also ==
- Colorado Plateau
- List of rock formations in the United States
