= List of Navajo Nation Scenic Byways =

Navajo Nation Scenic Byways

System information
- Formed: 1996

System links
- Scenic Byways; National; National Forest; BLM; NPS

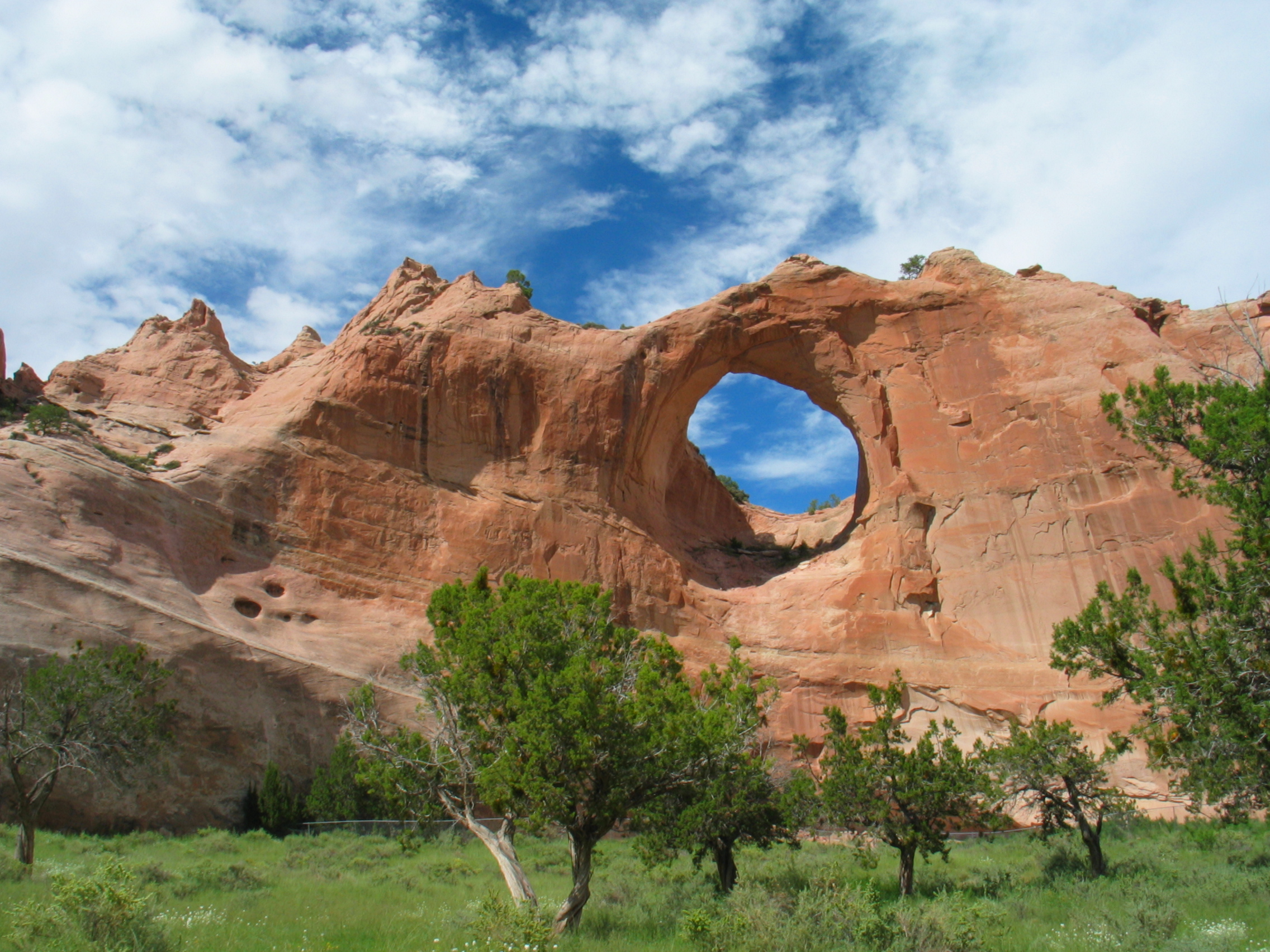
Window Rock, Arizona

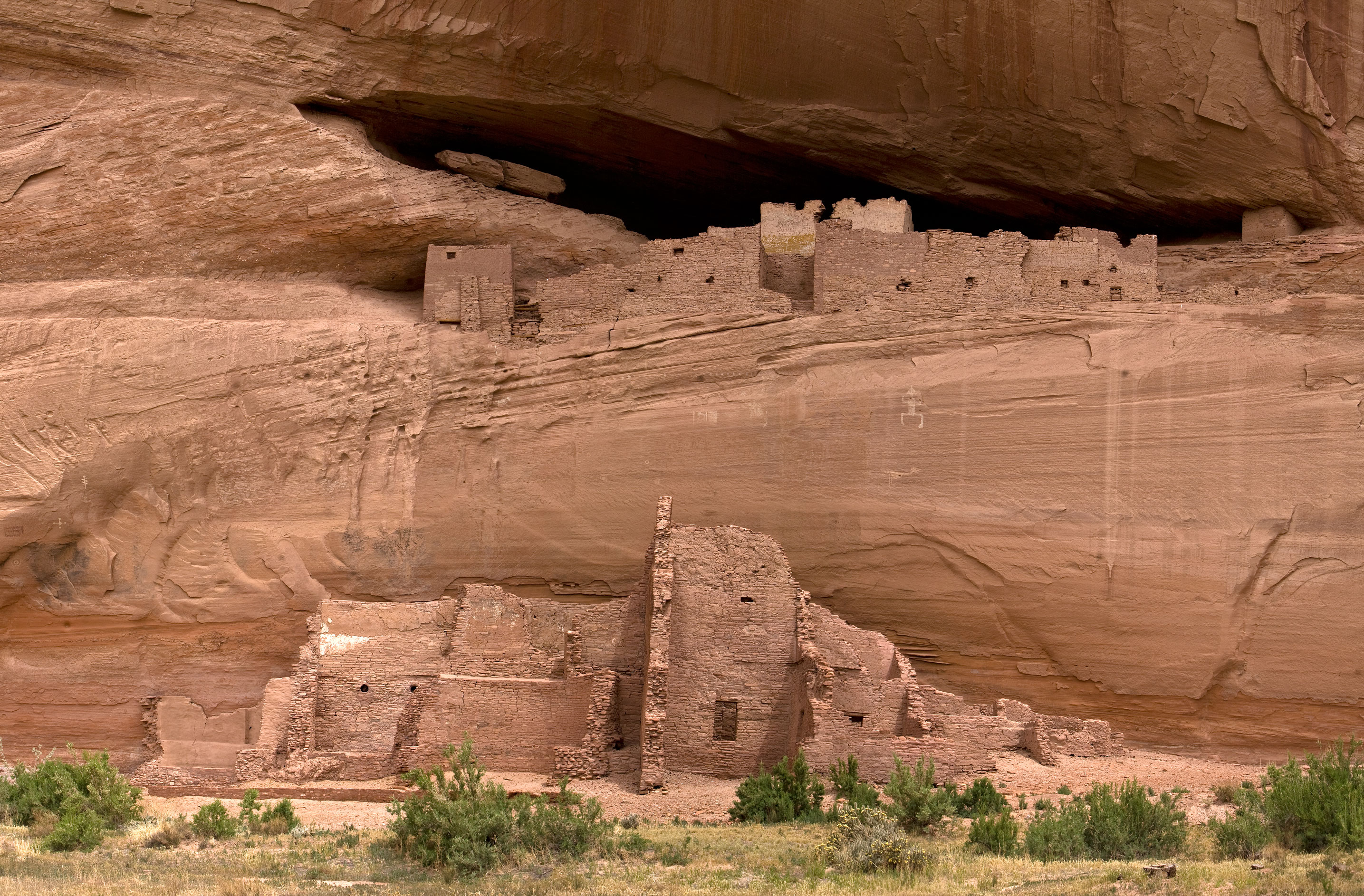
Canyon de Chelly National Monument

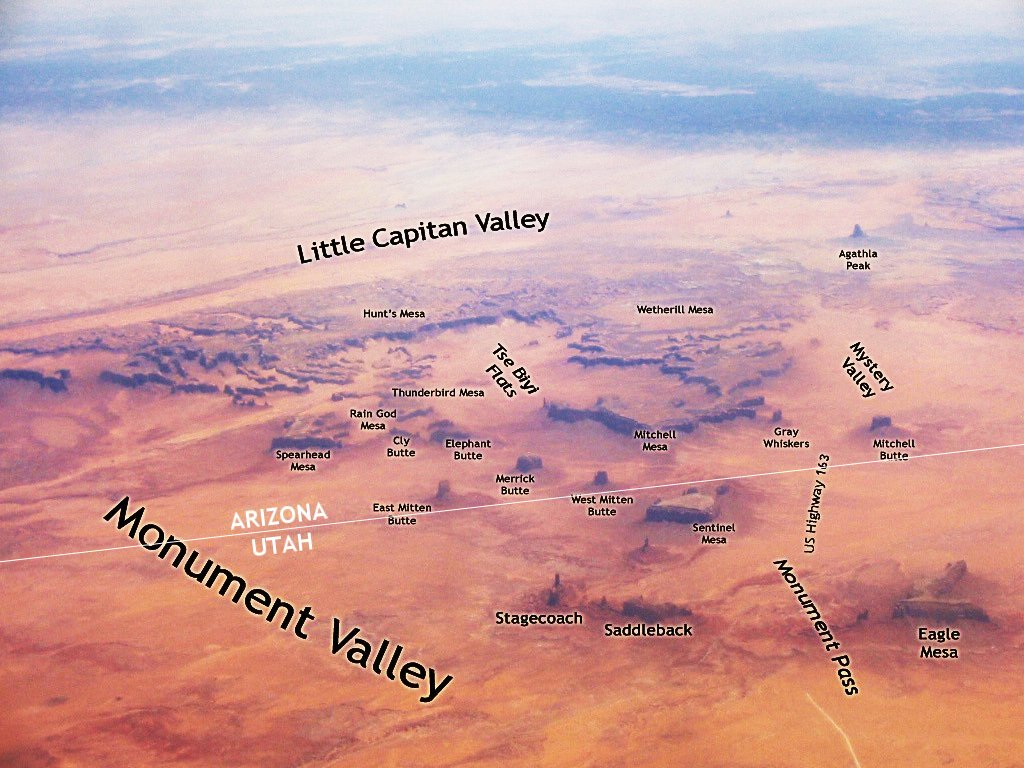
Aerial view of Monument Valley

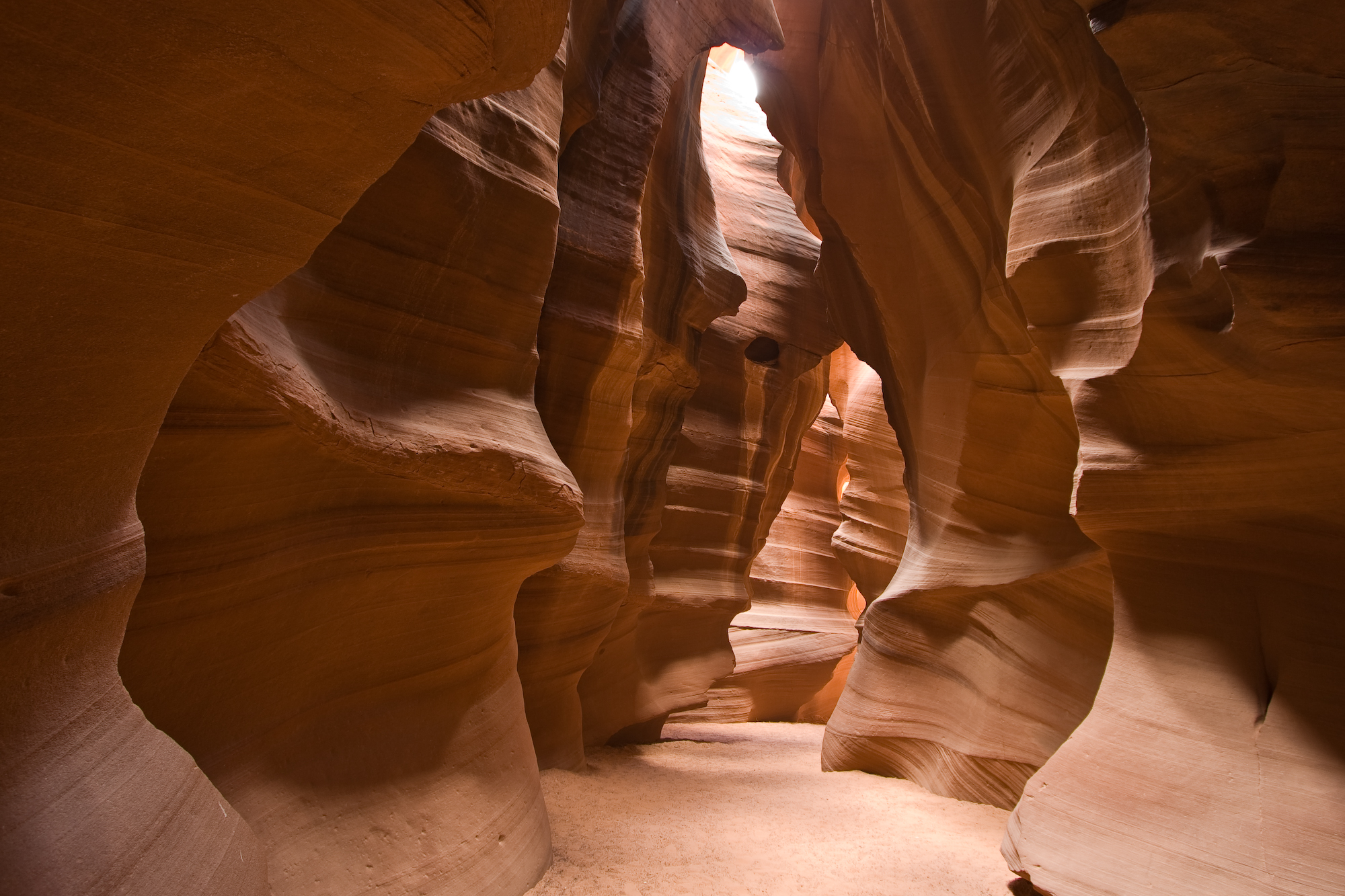
Antelope Canyon

Navajo Nation Scenic Byways, also called Navajo Nation Scenic Roads, are roads to Navajo Nation sites of scenic or historic significance.

The plans for Navajo National Scenic Byways were developed by a task force including the Arizona Department of Transportation, and Bureau of Indian Affairs. It is administered with the Federal Highway Administration.

== List ==
The following table is a list of Navajo Nation Scenic Byways:

| Byway | Length | Notes | Designation |
|---|---|---|---|
| Diné Biítah "Among the People" Scenic Road | 103 miles | The scenic byway begins at Window Rock, Arizona, the Navajo Nation capitol, and travels along BIA Route 12 and Navajo Route 64 in New Mexico and Arizona to sacred Navajo places. Sites on the road include archaeological sites at Canyon de Chelly National Monument, the Navajo Nation Museum, and the Navajo Code Talker Monument. | |
| Kayenta-Monument Valley Scenic Road | 27.7 miles | The scenic byway, along U.S. Route 163, passes by "unmissable monoliths" of Monument Valley, like Totem Pole, Three Sisters, and Merrick Butte. | |
| Naat’tsis’aan (Navajo Mountain) Scenic Road | 68 miles | The road travels along Arizona State Route 98 through historic, sacred lands of the Paiute, Hopi and Navajo. The earliest of these were in the area 8,000 B.C. or earlier. It includes the Navajo's most sacred mountain, Naat'tsis'aan, or Navajo Mountain. Other sites are Antelope Canyon and the LeChee Rock. | |
| Tse’nikani (Flat Mesa Rock) Scenic Road | 48 miles | Red sandstone mesas, buttes and spires make up the landscape along U.S. Route 191 by Mexican Hat, Utah. | |
| Vermilion Cliffs Scenic Road | 82 miles | It is a scenic road through Marble Canyon, by Vermillion Cliffs and across the Navajo Bridge. The landscape scenery changes dramatically along the route with a 4,500 feet (1,400 m) change in elevation. | |

A related byway is the Trail of Ancients Scenic Byway in New Mexico. It was designated a byway for its prehistoric archaeological sites.
