= Padre Point (Utah) =

Cape on Lake Powell in San Juan County, Utah, US

Coordinates: 37°01′38″N 111°16′43″W

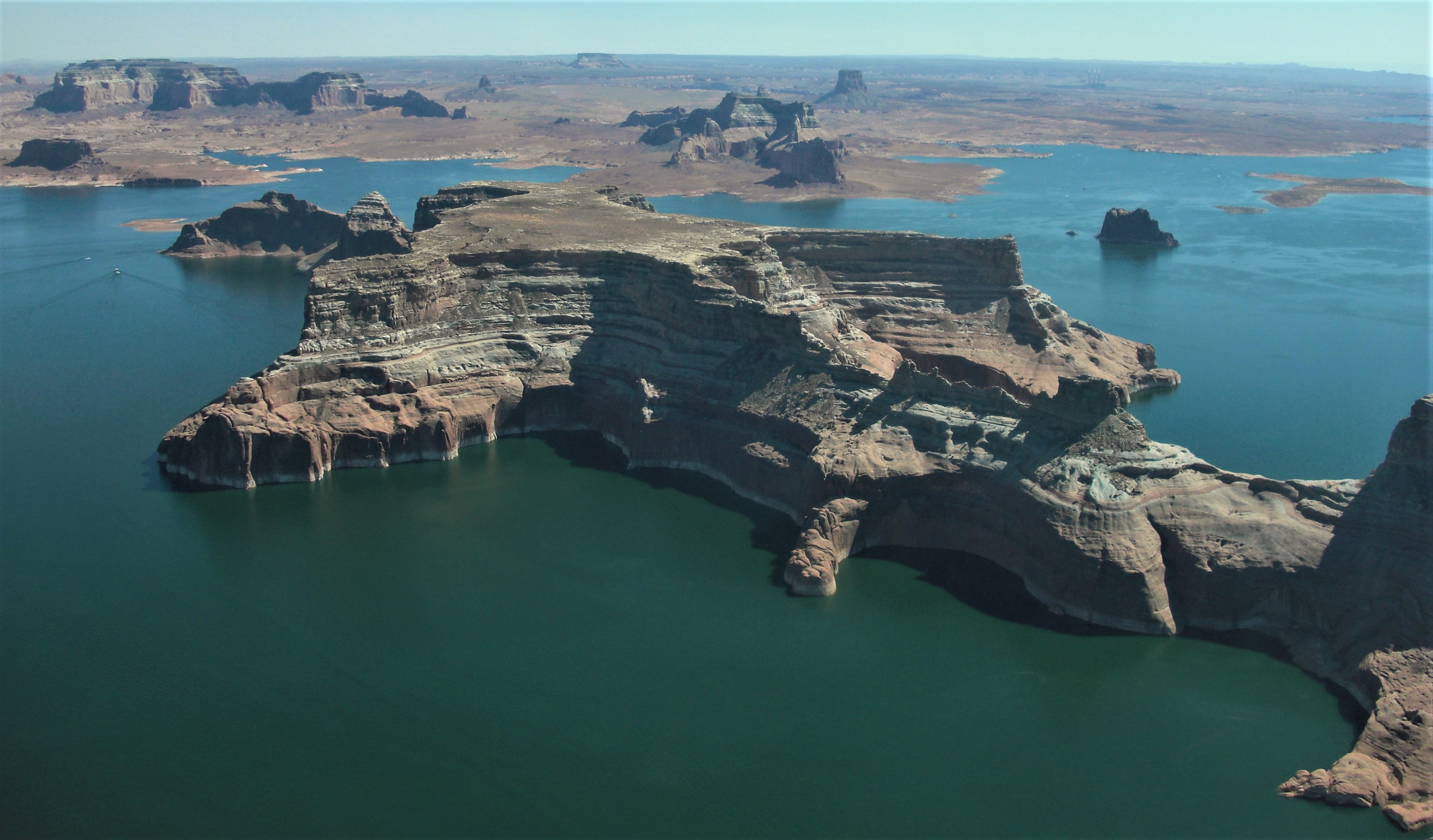
Looking south at Padre Point (in the top center of photograph, behind Kane Point), August 2011

Padre Point is a cape on the south shore of Lake Powell in extreme southwestern San Juan County, Utah, United States.

== Description ==
Located on the northern tip of the cape is Dominguez Butte. Formerly an island in the reservoir, but at lower water levels, Padres Butte is located near the tip of Padre Point. Nearly all of the cape is located on the Navajo Nation, including Dominguez Butte, but not Padres Butte (which is located within Glen Canyon National Recreation Area).
