= Dominguez Butte =

Butte in San Juan County, Utah, United States

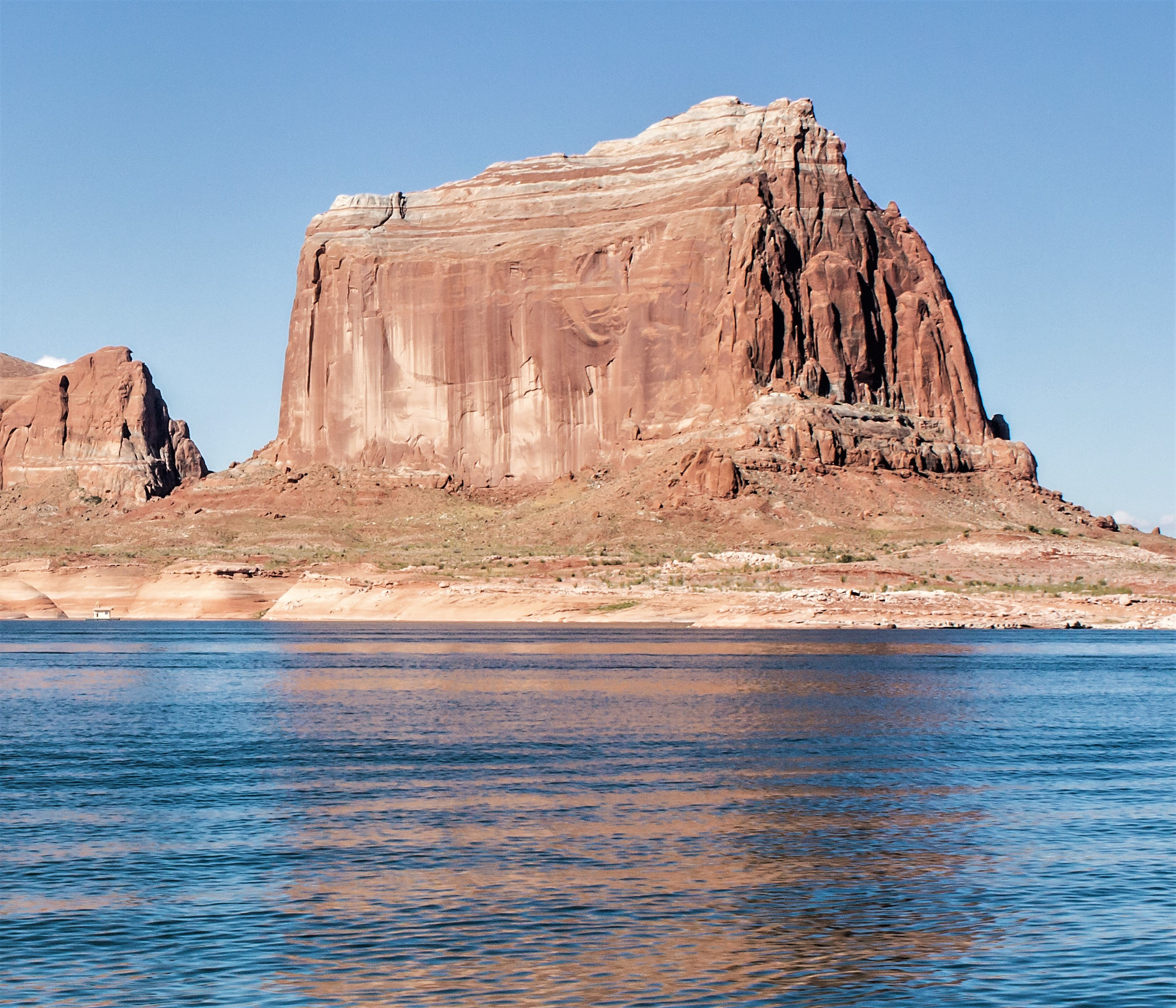
- Northeast aspect

Highest point
- Elevation: 4,476 ft (1,364 m)
- Prominence: 656 ft (200 m)
- Parent peak: Point 4700
- Isolation: 0.66 mi (1.06 km)
- Coordinates: 37°01′50″N 111°16′42″W

Naming
- Etymology: Francisco Atanasio Domínguez

Geography
- Location within Utah Location within the United States
- Location: Navajo Reservation; San Juan County, Utah, U.S.
- Parent range: Colorado Plateau
- Topo map: USGS Gunsight Butte

Geology
- Rock age: Jurassic
- Rock type: Entrada Sandstone

Dominguez Butte is a 4,476-foot (1,364 meter) elevation sandstone summit located south of Lake Powell, in San Juan County of southern Utah. It is situated on Navajo Nation land, 13 miles (21 km) northeast of the town of Page, and towers over 700 feet above the surrounding terrain as a landmark of the area. Dominguez Butte has a brief appearance in the 1968 film Planet of the Apes, when a spaceship crash lands in Lake Powell.

== Geology ==
Dominguez Butte is a butte composed primarily of Entrada Sandstone, similar to Padres Butte 1.5 miles (2.4 km) to the north, and Boundary Butte 2 miles (3.2 km) to the south. The Entrada Sandstone overlays Carmel Formation, and below that Page Sandstone at lake level. Above the Entrada layers is Romana Sandstone capped by Morrison Formation. It is located in the southern edge of the Great Basin Desert on the Colorado Plateau. Precipitation runoff from this feature drains into the Colorado River watershed.

== History ==
Francisco Atanasio Domínguez (1740–1805) was a Franciscan missionary and explorer who led the 1776 Domínguez–Escalante expedition. Guided by local Native Americans, the expedition attempted to cross the Colorado River at Lee's Ferry, but found it too difficult. A second ford of the Colorado River, named the Crossing of the Fathers, was successfully made two miles north of Dominguez Butte on November 7, 1776. The descent to the crossing was so treacherous that they had to carve steps into the stone to ensure the livestock could make it down to the river. Today, this ford lies beneath Lake Powell.

This butte's name was officially adopted in 1976 by the U.S. Board on Geographic Names to commemorate Atanacio Domínguez.

== Gallery ==
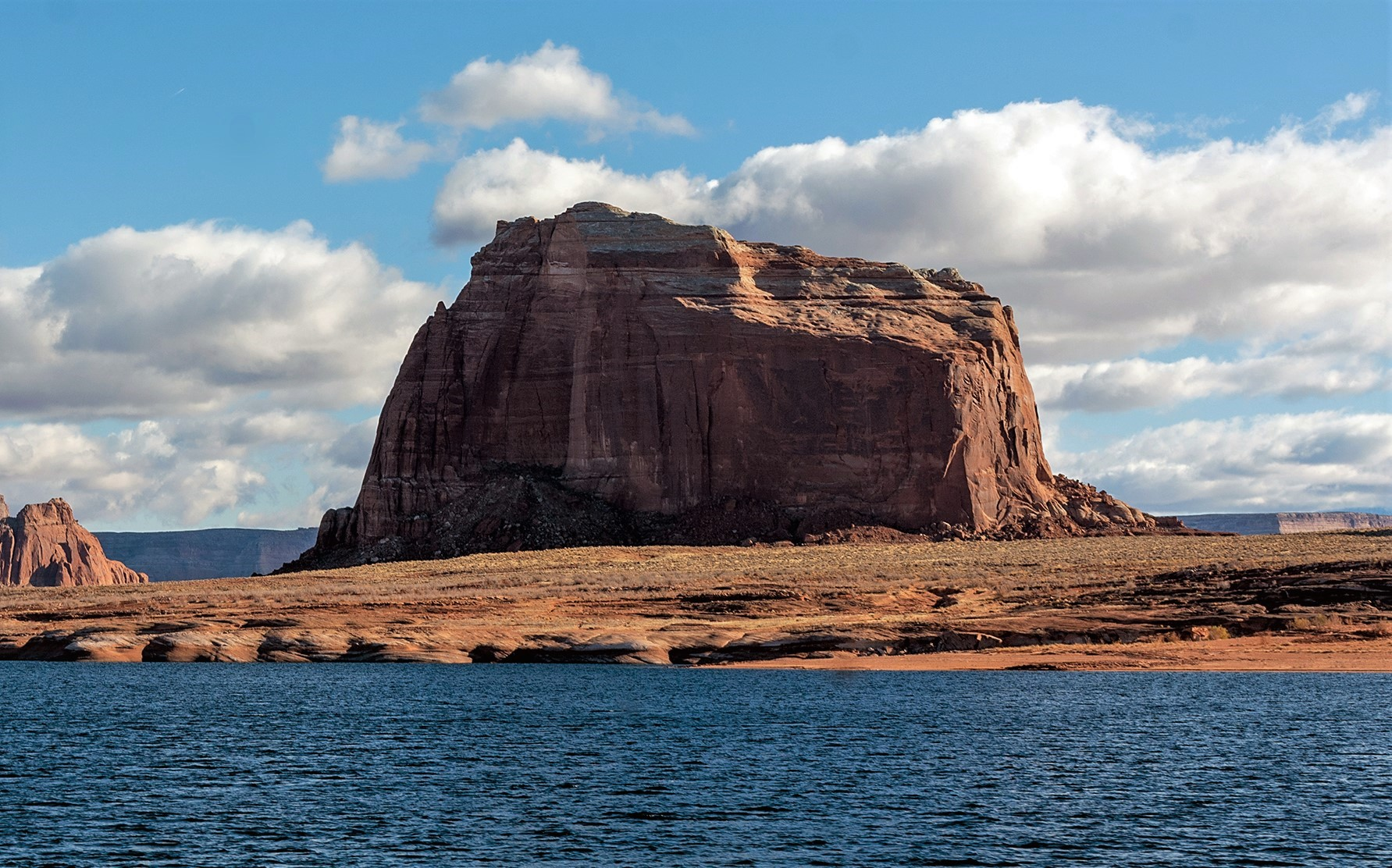
West aspect

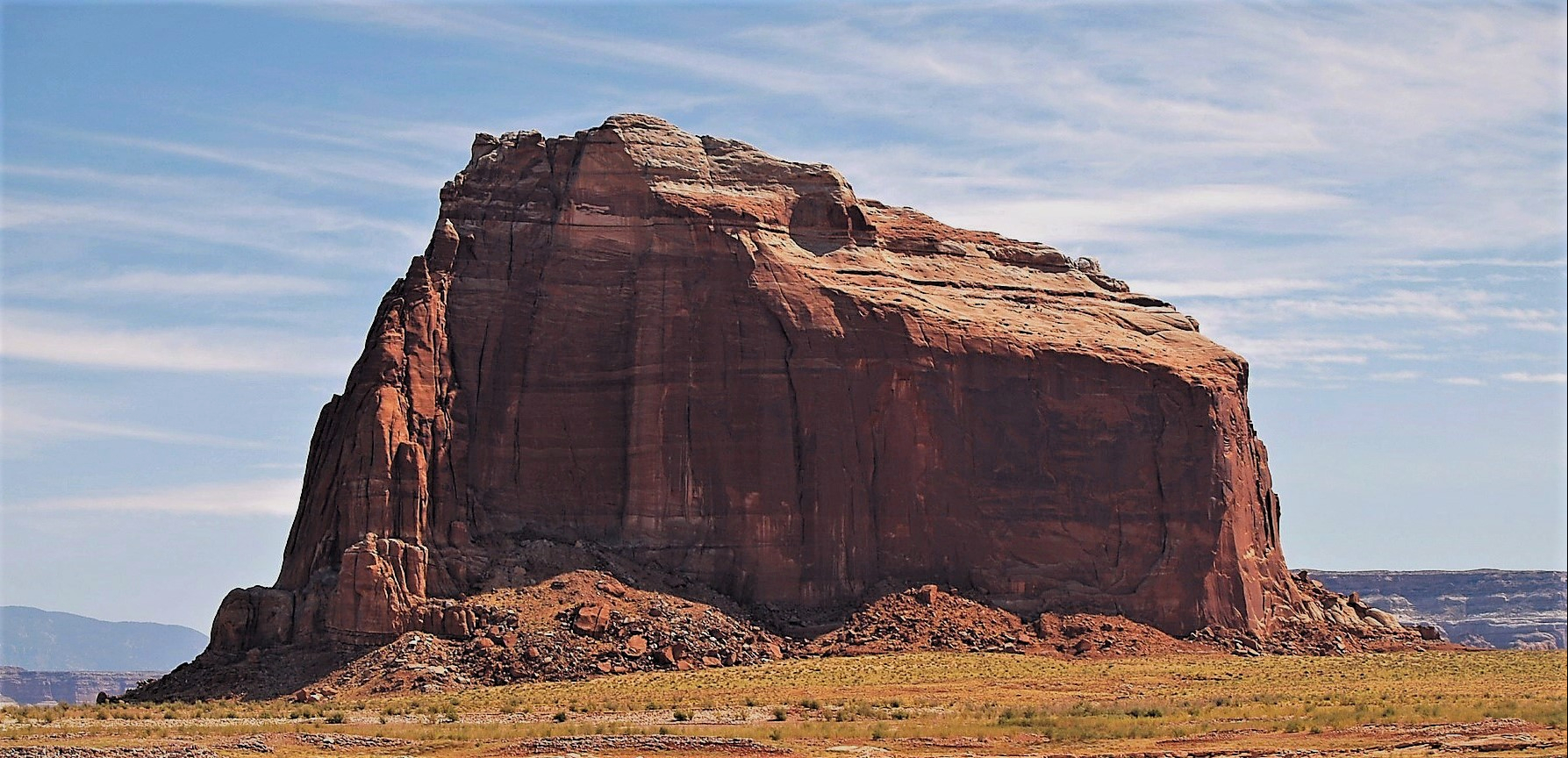
West aspect

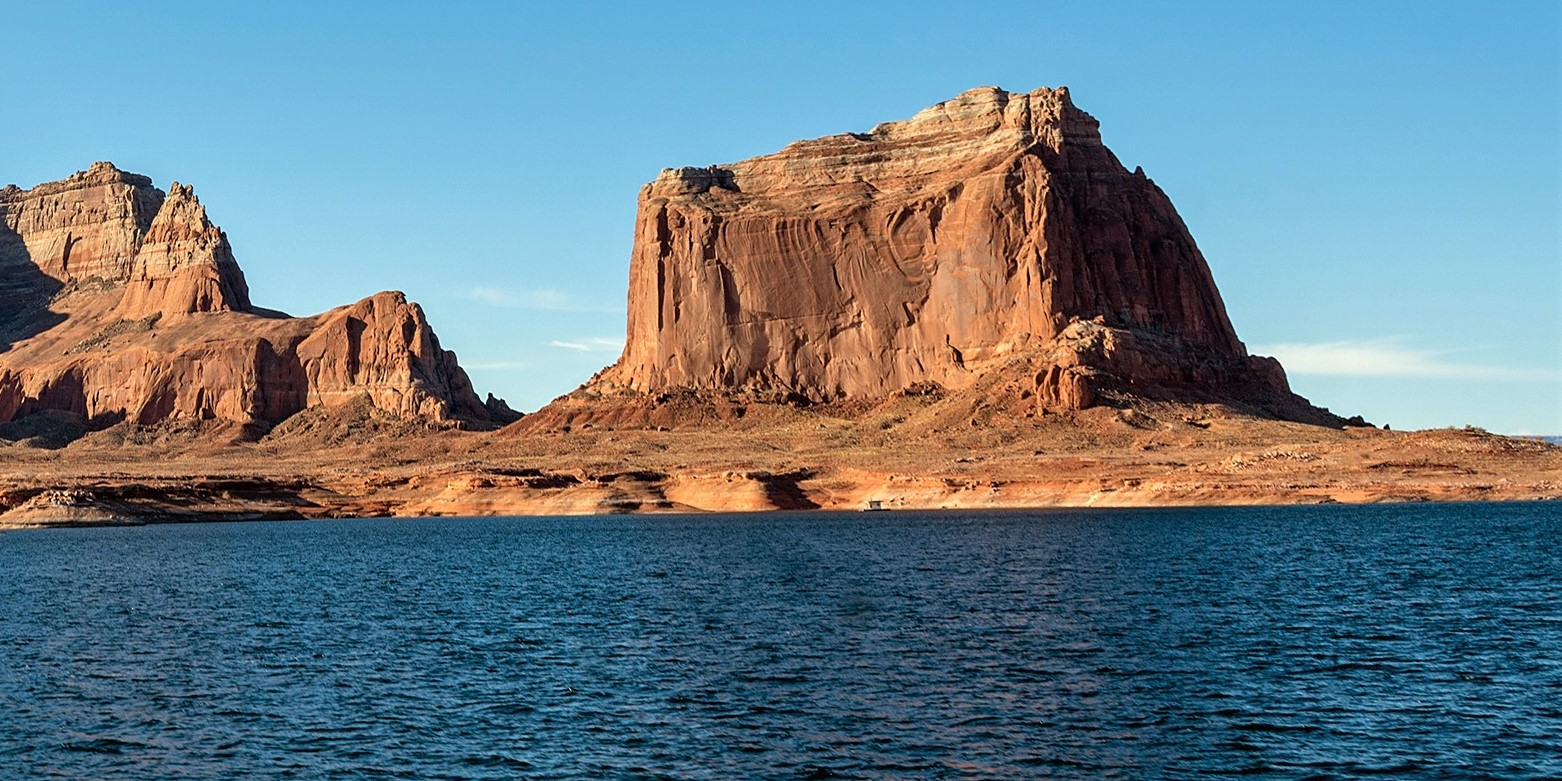
East aspect

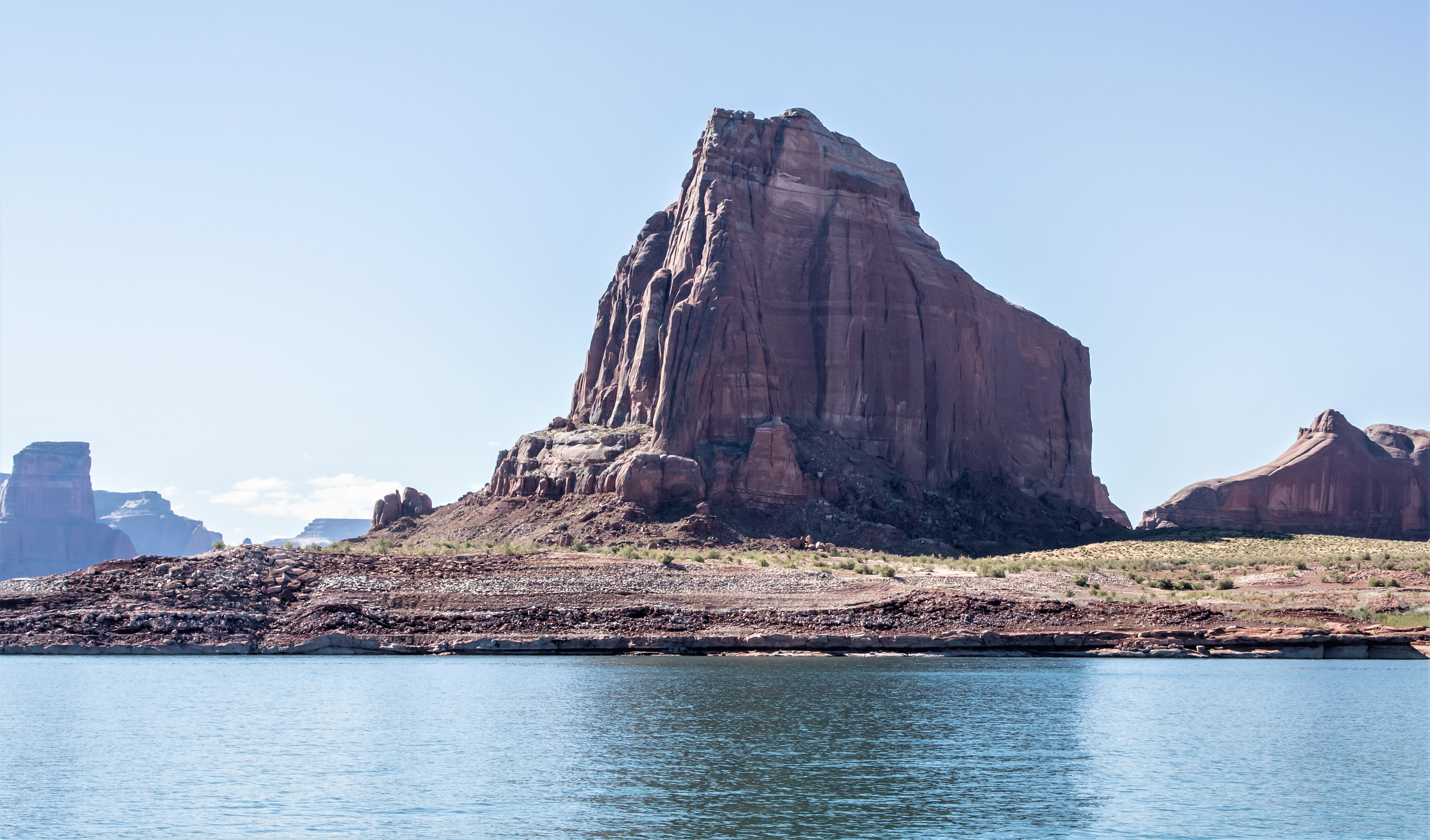
Dominguez Butte from northwest

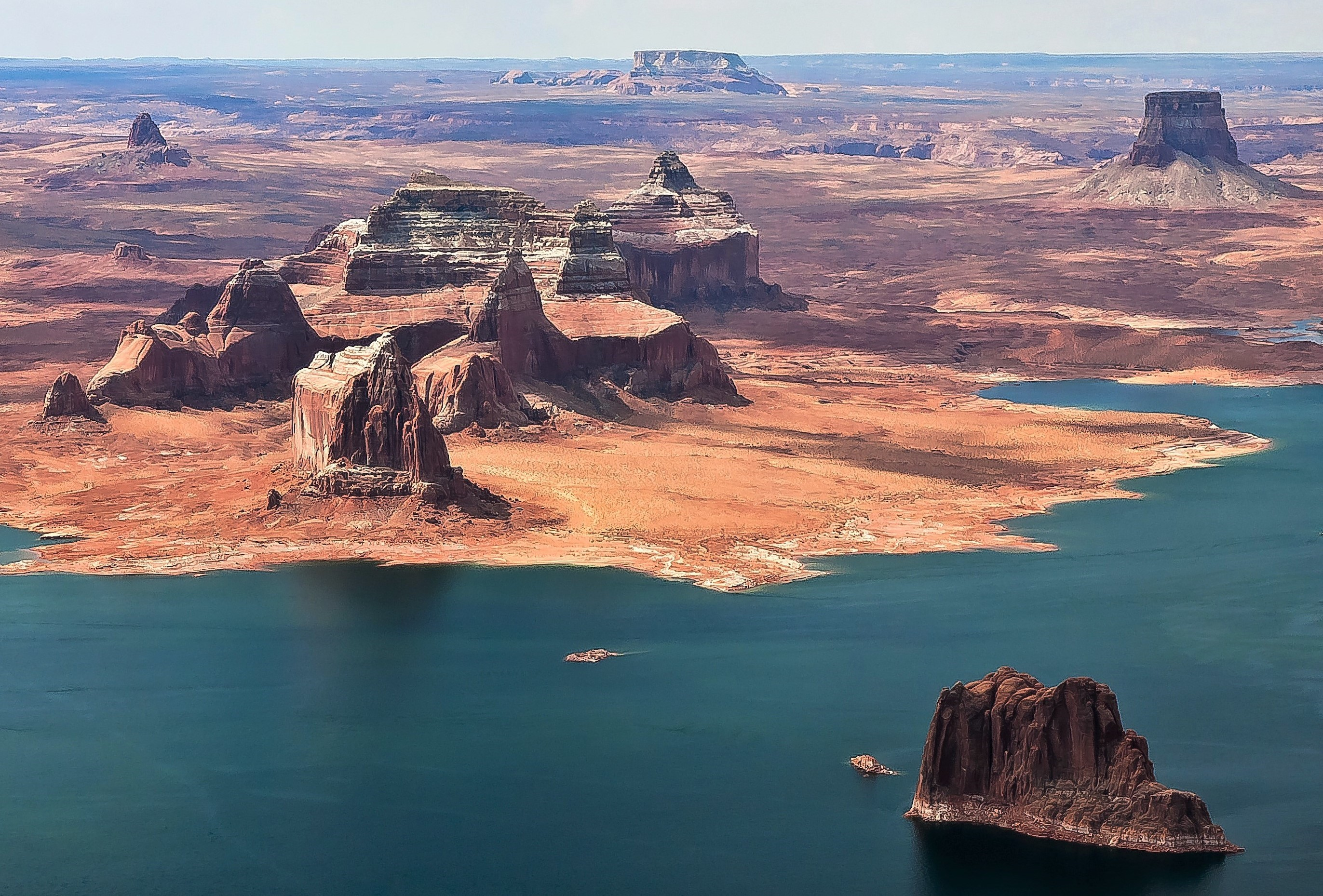
Aerial view looking south. Dominguez Butte left of center nearest water's edge.
(Tower Butte upper right corner. Padres Butte in lower right corner. LeChee Rock centered on horizon)

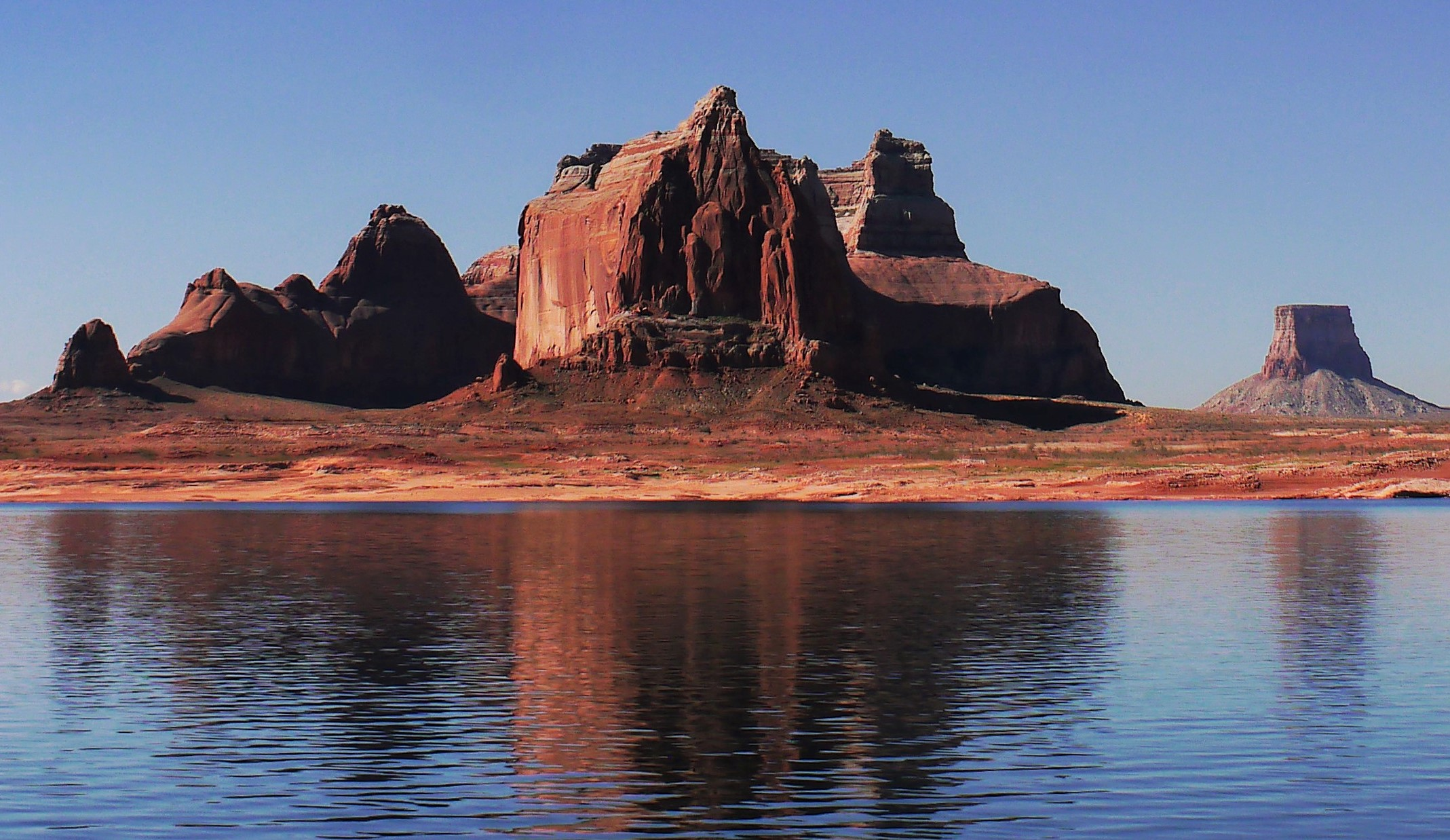
Dominguez Butte centered, Tower Butte far right. From the north.

== Climate ==
According to the Köppen climate classification system, Dominguez Butte is located in an arid climate zone with hot, very dry summers, and chilly winters with very little snow. Spring and fall are the most favorable seasons to visit.

Climate data for Page, Arizona
Month	Jan	Feb	Mar	Apr	May	Jun	Jul	Aug	Sep	Oct	Nov	Dec	Year
Record high °F (°C)	64 (18)	72 (22)	82 (28)	91 (33)	102 (39)	107 (42)	109 (43)	106 (41)	100 (38)	93 (34)	77 (25)	66 (19)	109 (43)
Mean daily maximum °F (°C)	43.1 (6.2)	50.3 (10.2)	59.5 (15.3)	68.5 (20.3)	78.5 (25.8)	90.2 (32.3)	95.1 (35.1)	92.0 (33.3)	83.5 (28.6)	69.7 (20.9)	53.8 (12.1)	43.7 (6.5)	69.0 (20.6)
Mean daily minimum °F (°C)	26.3 (−3.2)	30.4 (−0.9)	37.0 (2.8)	43.6 (6.4)	52.6 (11.4)	62.3 (16.8)	68.3 (20.2)	66.4 (19.1)	58.4 (14.7)	46.6 (8.1)	34.7 (1.5)	27.1 (−2.7)	46.1 (7.8)
Record low °F (°C)	−11 (−24)	6 (−14)	18 (−8)	25 (−4)	31 (−1)	44 (7)	56 (13)	46 (8)	40 (4)	24 (−4)	16 (−9)	1 (−17)	−11 (−24)
Average precipitation inches (mm)	0.61 (15)	0.48 (12)	0.65 (17)	0.50 (13)	0.40 (10)	0.14 (3.6)	0.58 (15)	0.69 (18)	0.66 (17)	0.99 (25)	0.56 (14)	0.48 (12)	6.74 (171.6)
Average snowfall inches (cm)	2.1 (5.3)	1.2 (3.0)	0.2 (0.51)	0 (0)	0 (0)	0 (0)	0 (0)	0 (0)	0 (0)	0 (0)	0.5 (1.3)	1.4 (3.6)	5.4 (13.71)
Average precipitation days (≥ 0.01 in)	4.5	4.0	5.2	3.5	3.2	1.7	4.6	5.2	4.5	4.3	3.2	3.9	47.8
Average snowy days (≥ 0.1 in)	0.9	0.6	0.3	0	0	0	0	0	0	0	0.2	0.6	2.6
Source: NOAA

== See also ==
- Colorado Plateau
- List of rock formations in the United States
