= Padres Butte =

Butte in Glen Canyon, San Juan County, Utah, US

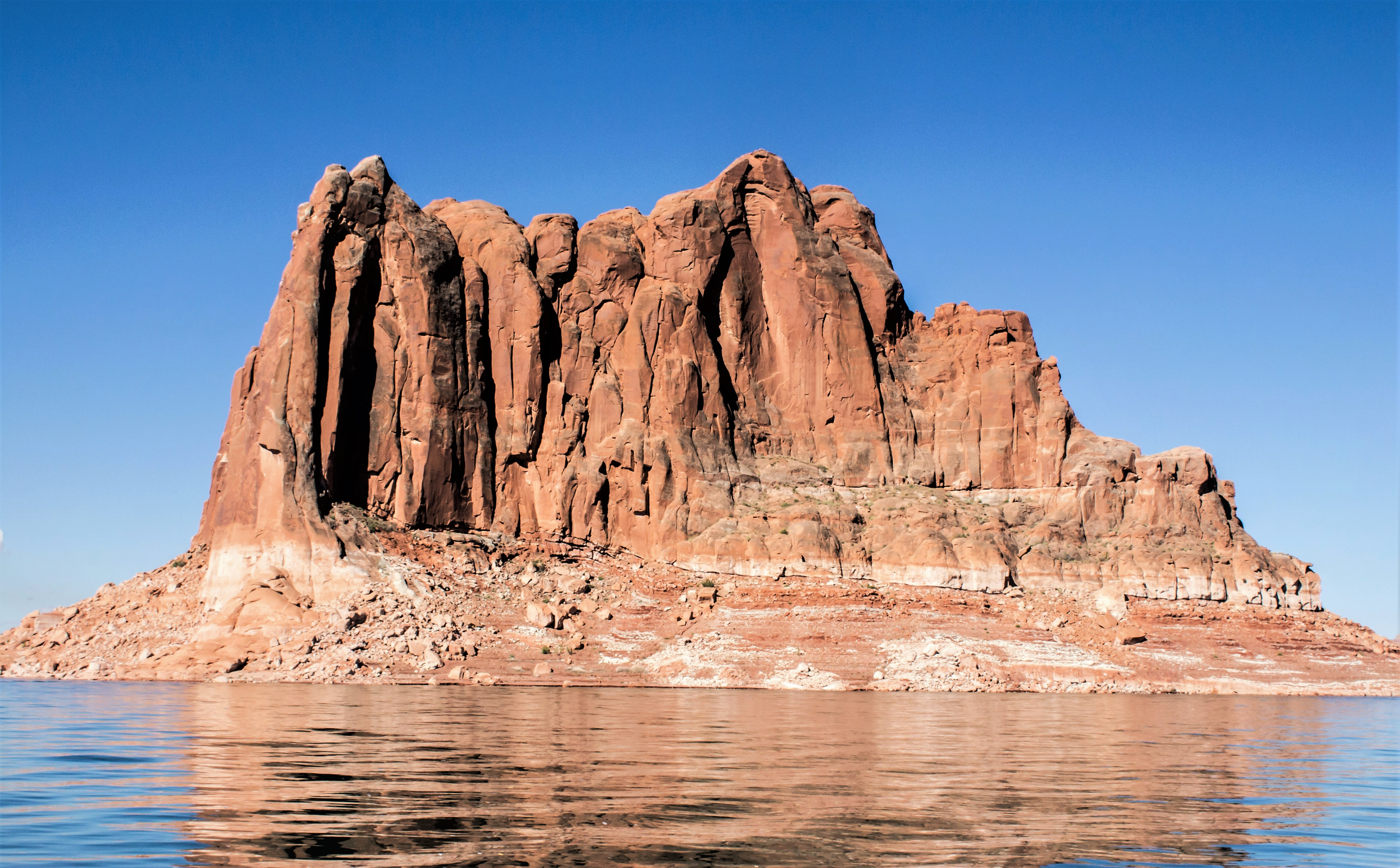
- East aspect of Padres Butte, June 2015

Highest point
- Elevation: 4,043 ft (1,232 m)<=
- Prominence: 463 ft (141 m)
- Parent peak: Dominguez Butte
- Isolation: 1.29 mi (2.08 km)
- Coordinates: 37°02′54″N 111°16′58″W

Geography
- Location within Utah Location within the United States
- Country: United States
- State: Utah
- County: San Juan
- Protected area: Glen Canyon National Recreation Area
- Parent range: Colorado Plateau
- Topo map: USGS Gunsight Butte

Geology
- Rock age: Jurassic
- Rock type: Entrada Sandstone

Climbing
- Easiest route: class 5.x climbing

Padres Butte is a butte near the tip of Padre Point on the south shore of Lake Powell in San Juan County, Utah, United States.

== Description ==
The summit of the butte has an elevation of 4,043 feet (1,232 m). It was formerly an island in the man-made lake, but land connecting the butte with the rest of Padre Point has been exposed as the lake's water levels have declined.

Padres Butte marks the site of the historical Crossing of the Fathers, a series of sand bars along the great bend in the Colorado River a mile west of the butte that once offered a fordable crossing of the river. This geographical feature's name was officially adopted in 1961 by the U.S. Board on Geographic Names.

According to the Köppen climate classification system, Gregory Butte is located in an arid climate zone with hot, very dry summers, and chilly winters with very little snow.

== See also ==
- Colorado Plateau

== Gallery ==
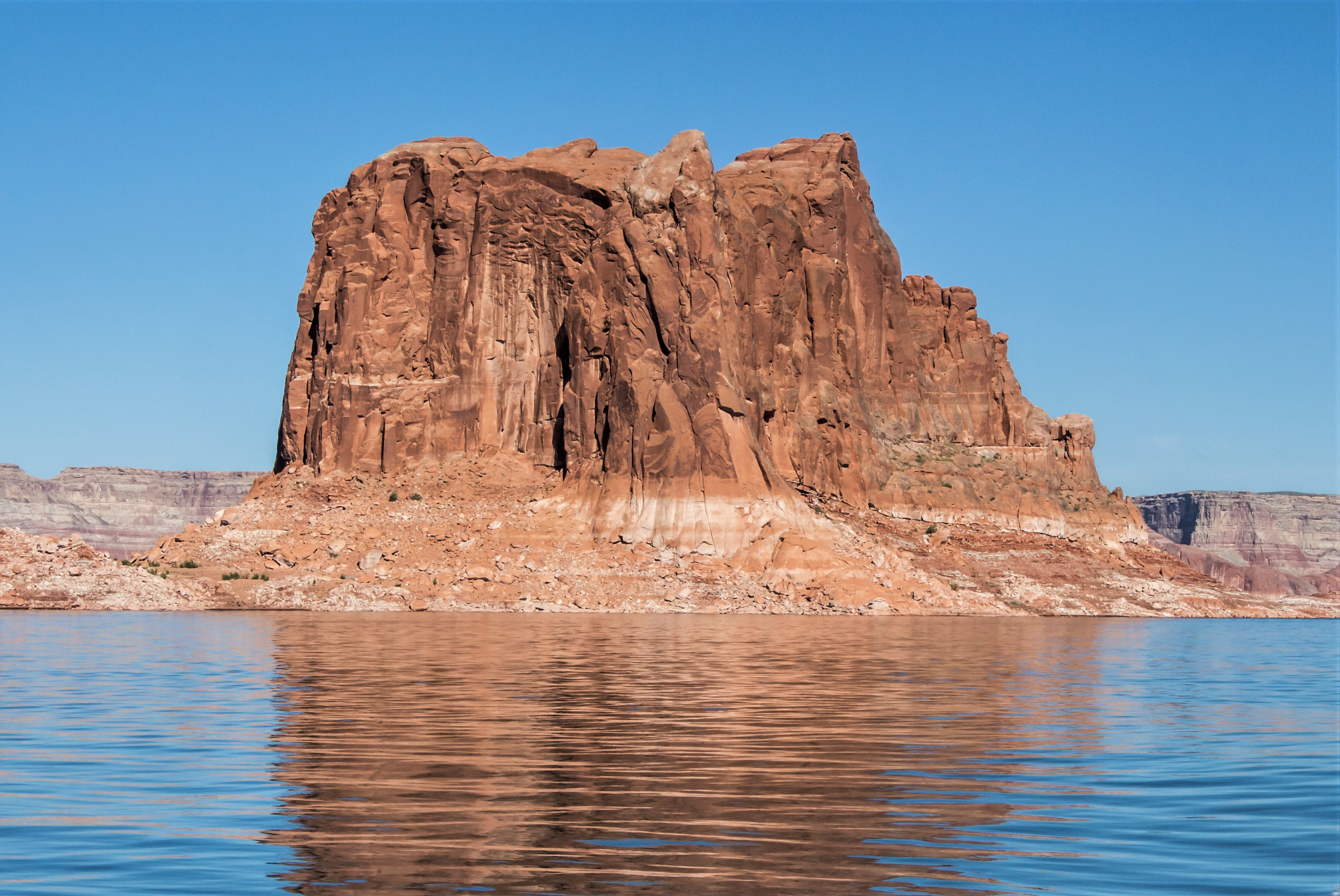
Southeast aspect

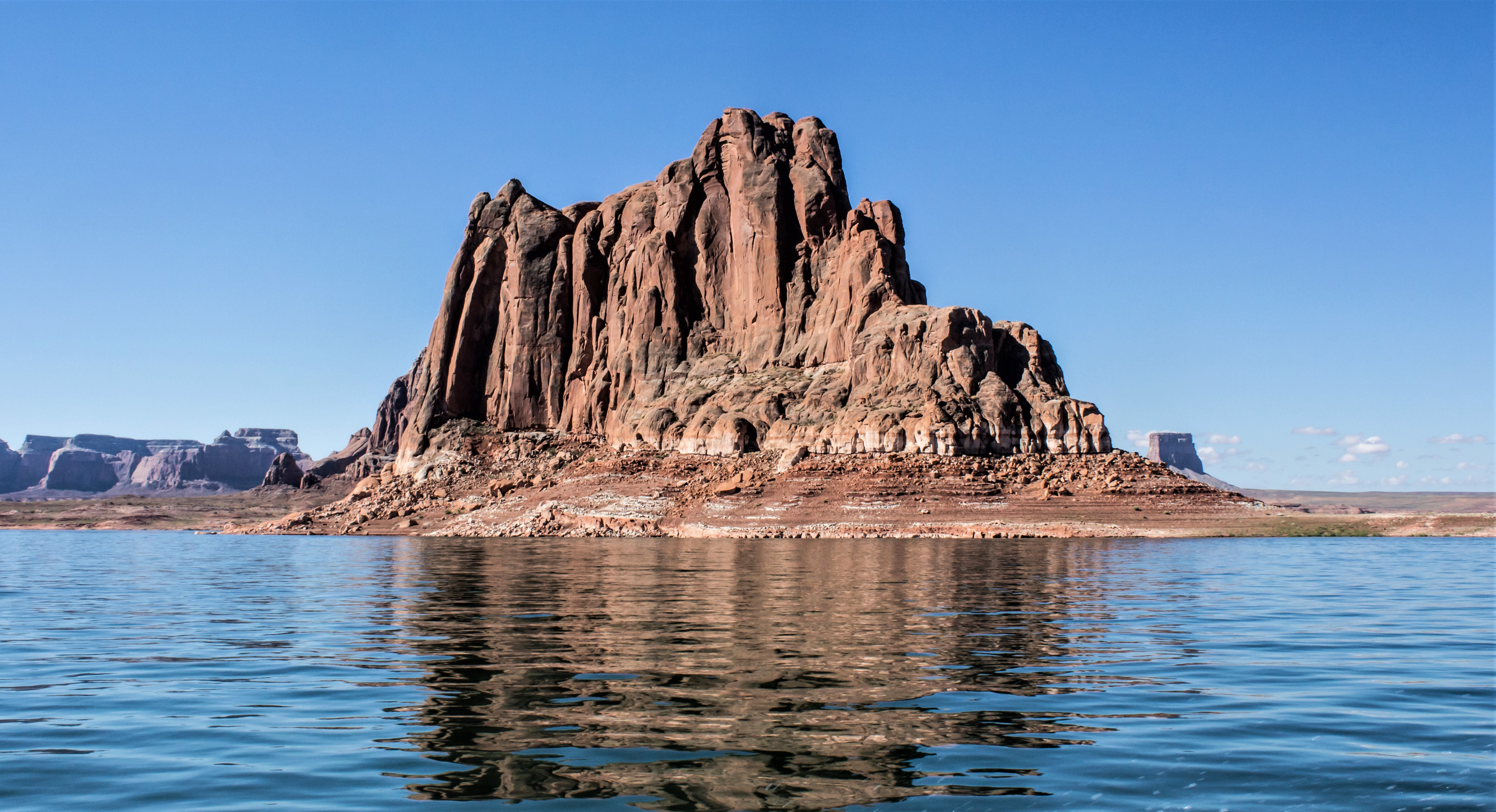
Northeast aspect

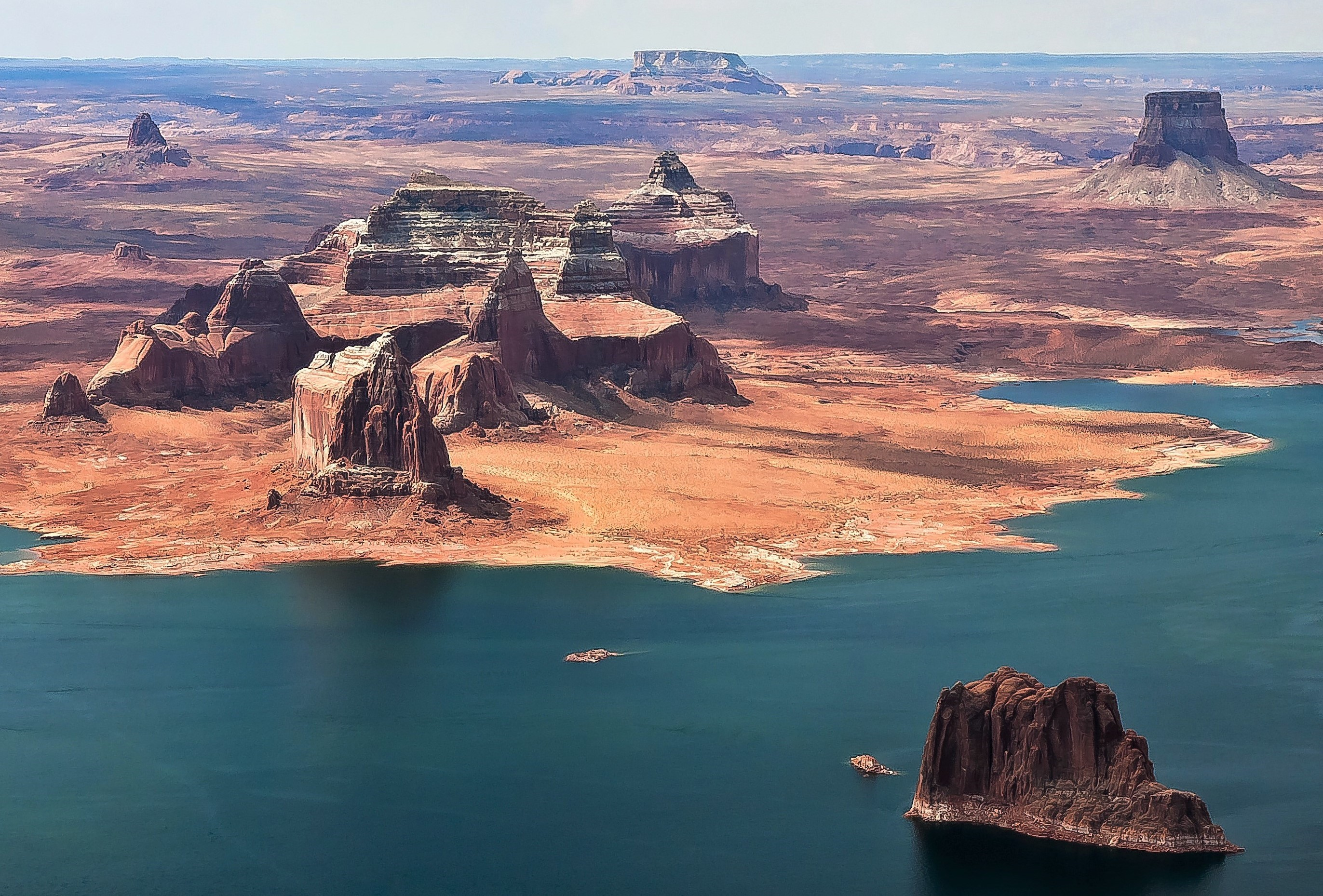
Padres Butte in lower right corner
