= Tower Butte =

Mountain in Coconino County, Arizona, United States

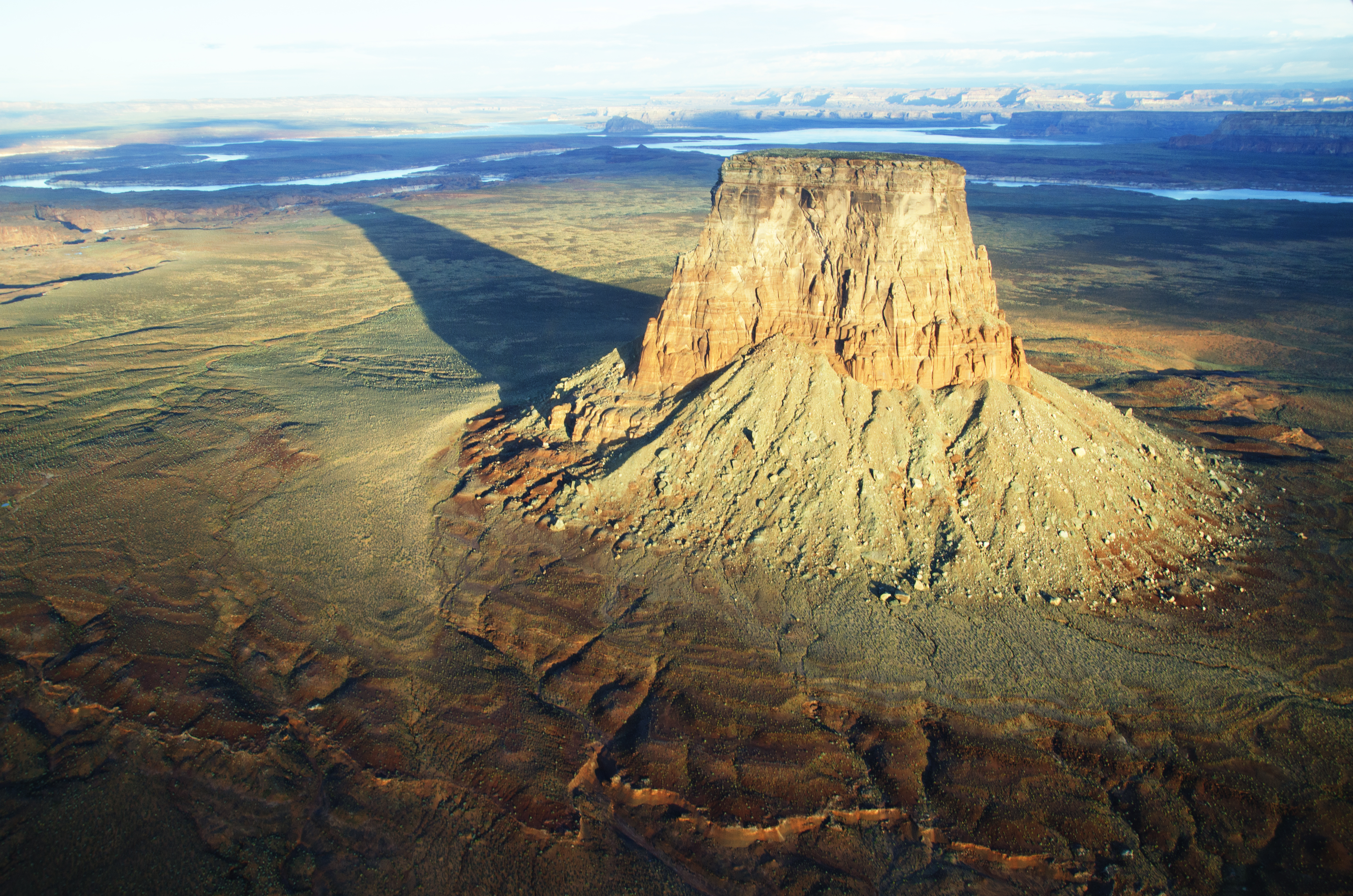
- East aspect

Highest point
- Elevation: 5,287 ft (1,611 m)
- Prominence: 977 ft (298 m)
- Parent peak: Point 5408
- Isolation: 4.22 mi (6.79 km)
- Coordinates: 36°58′11″N 111°18′35″W

Geography
- Location within Arizona Location within the United States
- Location: Navajo Reservation; Coconino County, Arizona, U.S.
- Parent range: Colorado Plateau
- Topo map: USGS Wild Horse Mesa

Geology
- Rock age: Jurassic
- Rock type: Entrada Sandstone

Climbing
- First ascent: October 23, 1994
- Easiest route: class 5.10a climbing

Tower Butte is a 5,287-foot (1,611 meter) elevation sandstone summit located south of Lake Powell, in northern Arizona. Tower Butte is a butte composed of Romana and Entrada Sandstones with a Morrison Formation caprock. It is situated 9 miles (14 km) northeast of the town of Page, and 7.5 miles (12.1 km) north of LeChee Rock, on Navajo Nation land, towering over 1,000 feet above the surrounding terrain as an iconic landmark of the area. Precipitation runoff from this feature drains into Lake Powell, which is part of the Colorado River drainage basin. The first ascent of Tower Butte was made October 23, 1994, by Jason Keith and David Insley. However, they were not the first to visit the summit as they reported finding litter from prior helicopter landings. An outfit operating out of Page flies helicopter sightseeing flights which land on the flat top of the butte where tourists have panoramic views of the Glen Canyon National Recreation Area, Lake Powell, and Navajo Mountain.

== Climate ==
According to the Köppen climate classification system, Tower Butte is located in an arid climate zone with hot, very dry summers, and chilly winters with very little snow. It is located in the southern edge of the Great Basin Desert on the Colorado Plateau. Spring and fall are the most favorable seasons to visit.

Climate data for Page, Arizona
Month	Jan	Feb	Mar	Apr	May	Jun	Jul	Aug	Sep	Oct	Nov	Dec	Year
Record high °F (°C)	64 (18)	72 (22)	82 (28)	91 (33)	102 (39)	107 (42)	109 (43)	106 (41)	100 (38)	93 (34)	77 (25)	66 (19)	109 (43)
Mean daily maximum °F (°C)	43.1 (6.2)	50.3 (10.2)	59.5 (15.3)	68.5 (20.3)	78.5 (25.8)	90.2 (32.3)	95.1 (35.1)	92.0 (33.3)	83.5 (28.6)	69.7 (20.9)	53.8 (12.1)	43.7 (6.5)	69.0 (20.6)
Mean daily minimum °F (°C)	26.3 (−3.2)	30.4 (−0.9)	37.0 (2.8)	43.6 (6.4)	52.6 (11.4)	62.3 (16.8)	68.3 (20.2)	66.4 (19.1)	58.4 (14.7)	46.6 (8.1)	34.7 (1.5)	27.1 (−2.7)	46.1 (7.8)
Record low °F (°C)	−11 (−24)	6 (−14)	18 (−8)	25 (−4)	31 (−1)	44 (7)	56 (13)	46 (8)	40 (4)	24 (−4)	16 (−9)	1 (−17)	−11 (−24)
Average precipitation inches (mm)	0.61 (15)	0.48 (12)	0.65 (17)	0.50 (13)	0.40 (10)	0.14 (3.6)	0.58 (15)	0.69 (18)	0.66 (17)	0.99 (25)	0.56 (14)	0.48 (12)	6.74 (171.6)
Average snowfall inches (cm)	2.1 (5.3)	1.2 (3.0)	0.2 (0.51)	0 (0)	0 (0)	0 (0)	0 (0)	0 (0)	0 (0)	0 (0)	0.5 (1.3)	1.4 (3.6)	5.4 (13.71)
Average precipitation days (≥ 0.01 in)	4.5	4.0	5.2	3.5	3.2	1.7	4.6	5.2	4.5	4.3	3.2	3.9	47.8
Average snowy days (≥ 0.1 in)	0.9	0.6	0.3	0	0	0	0	0	0	0	0.2	0.6	2.6
Source: NOAA

== Gallery ==
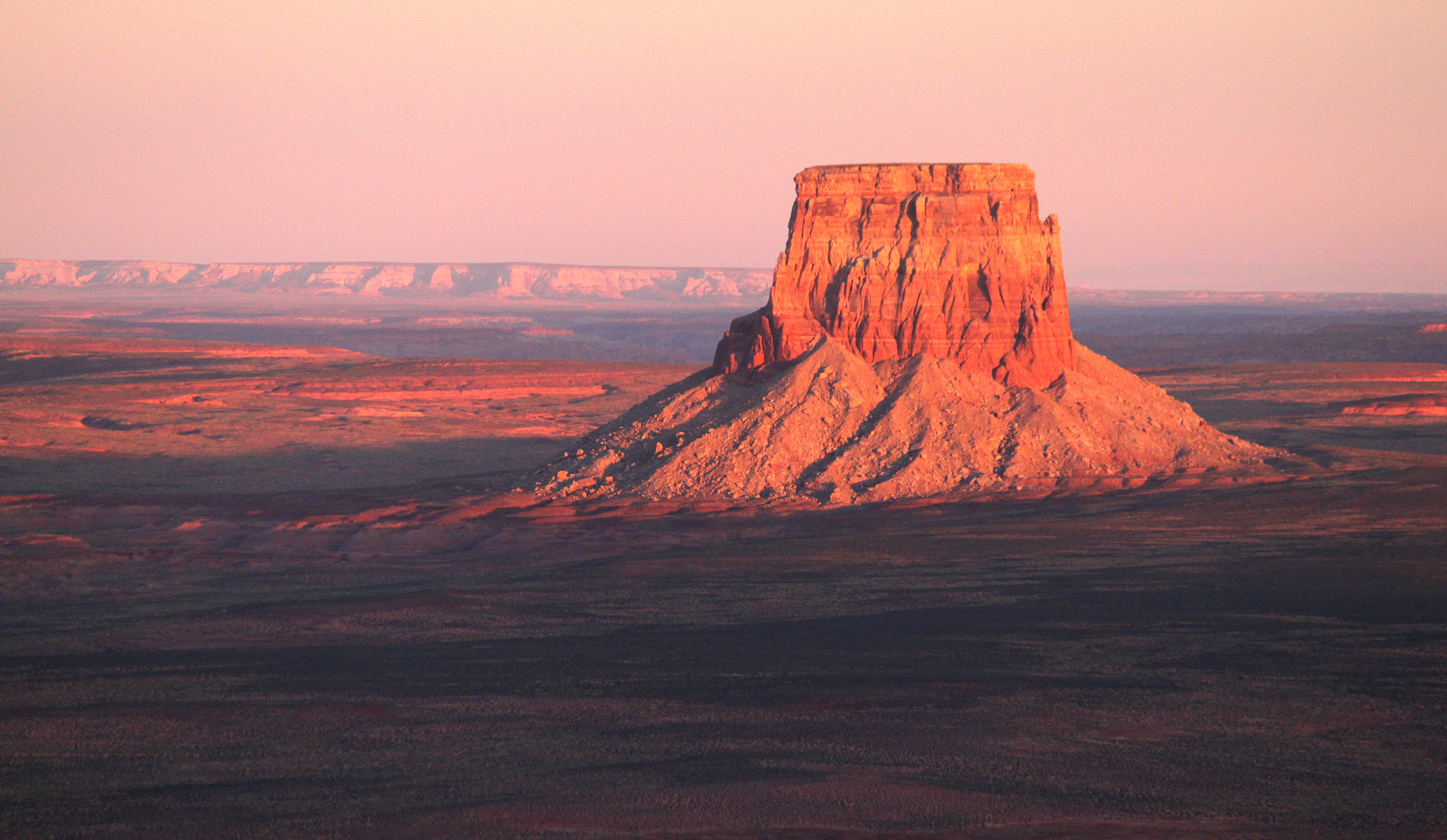
From the northwest at Alstrom Point

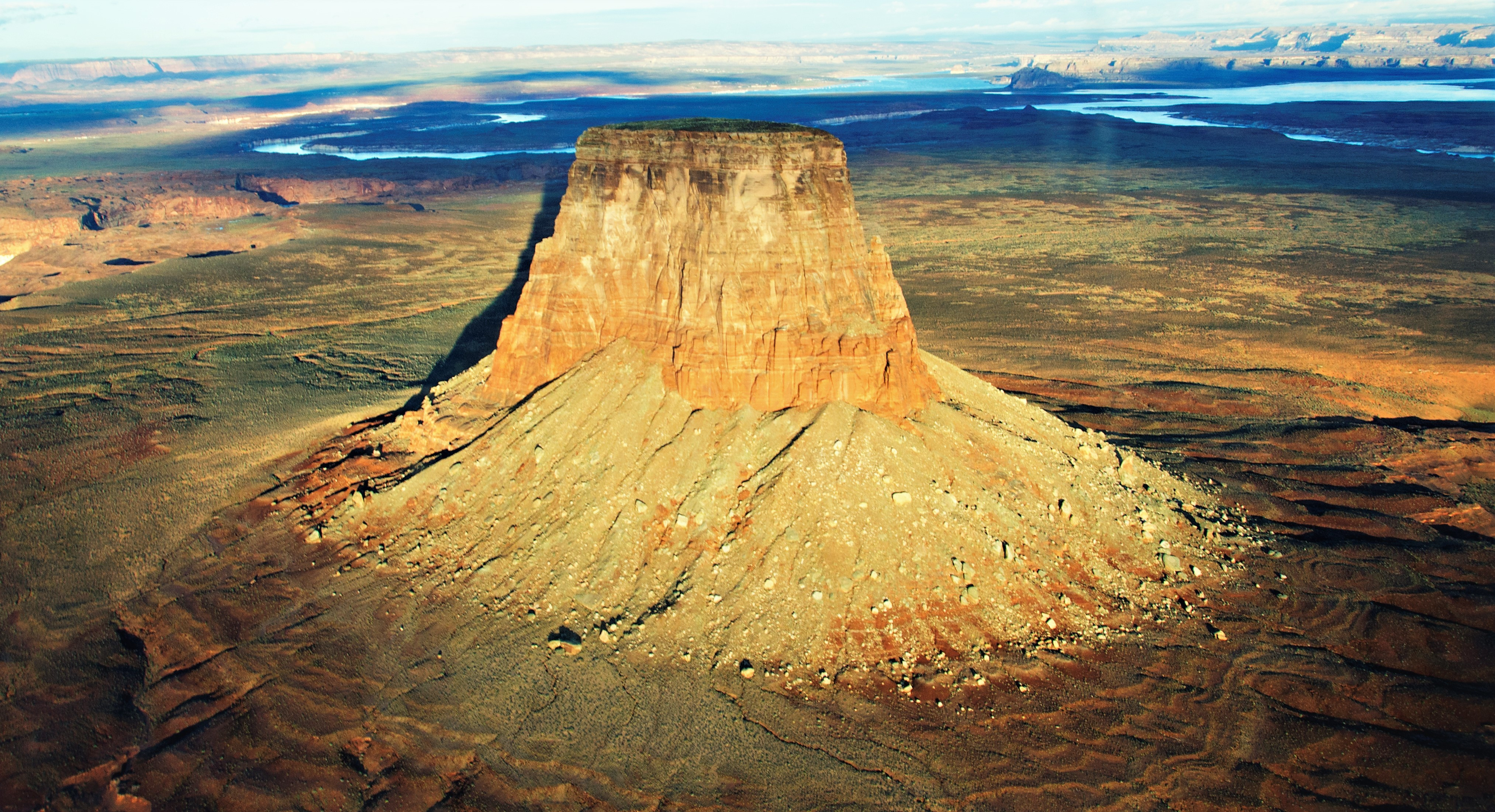

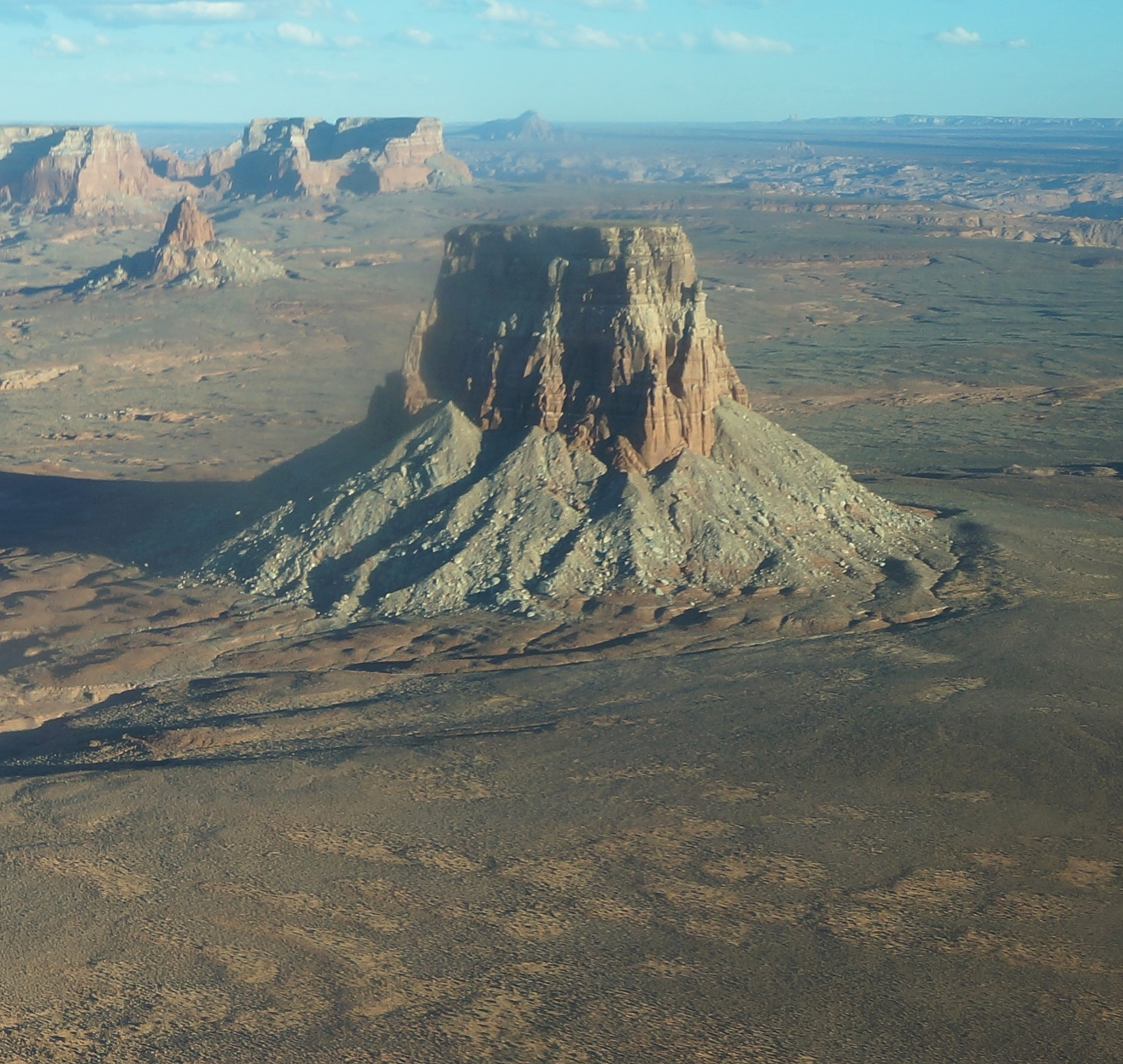
Aerial view from northwest

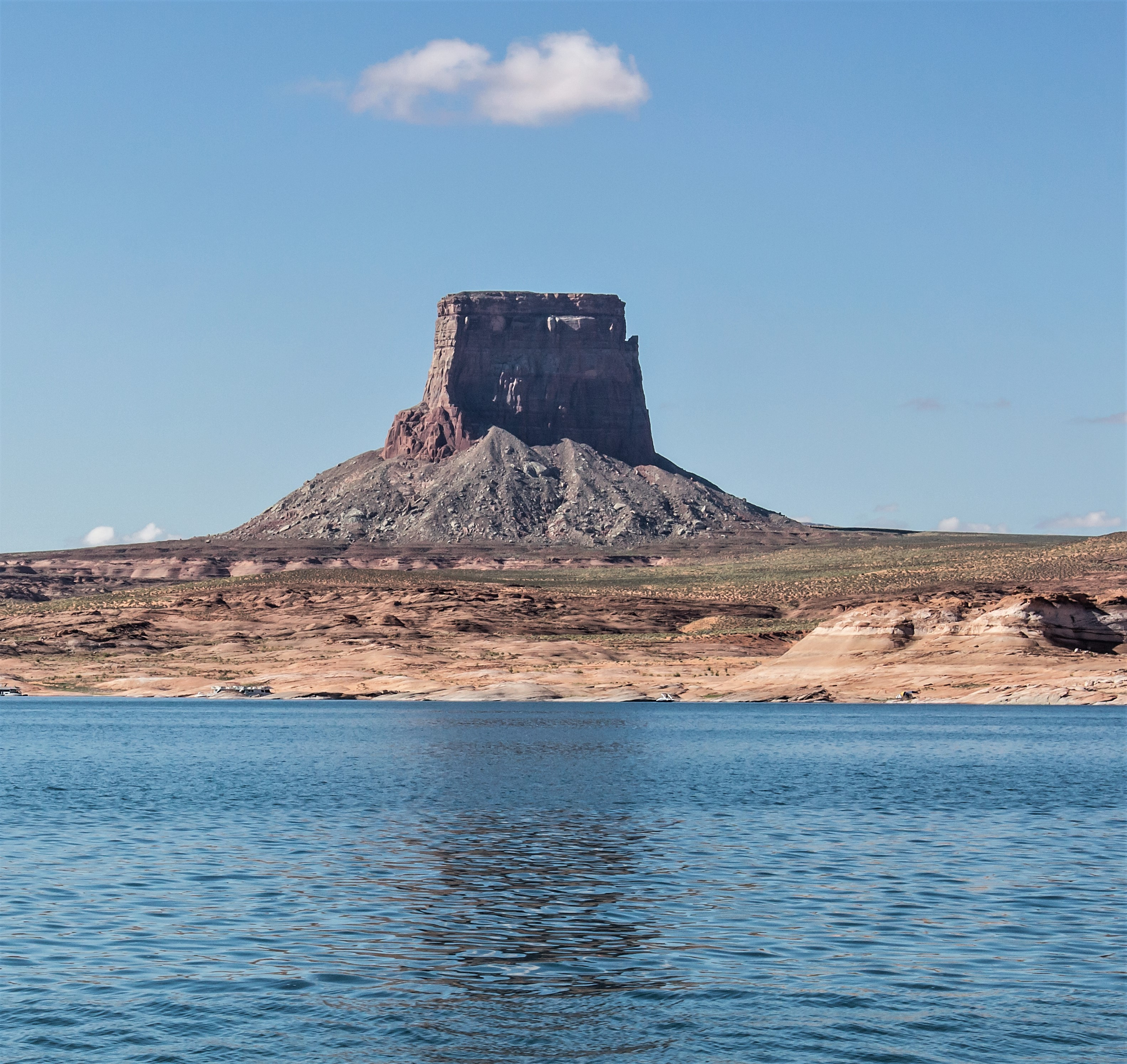
From the north

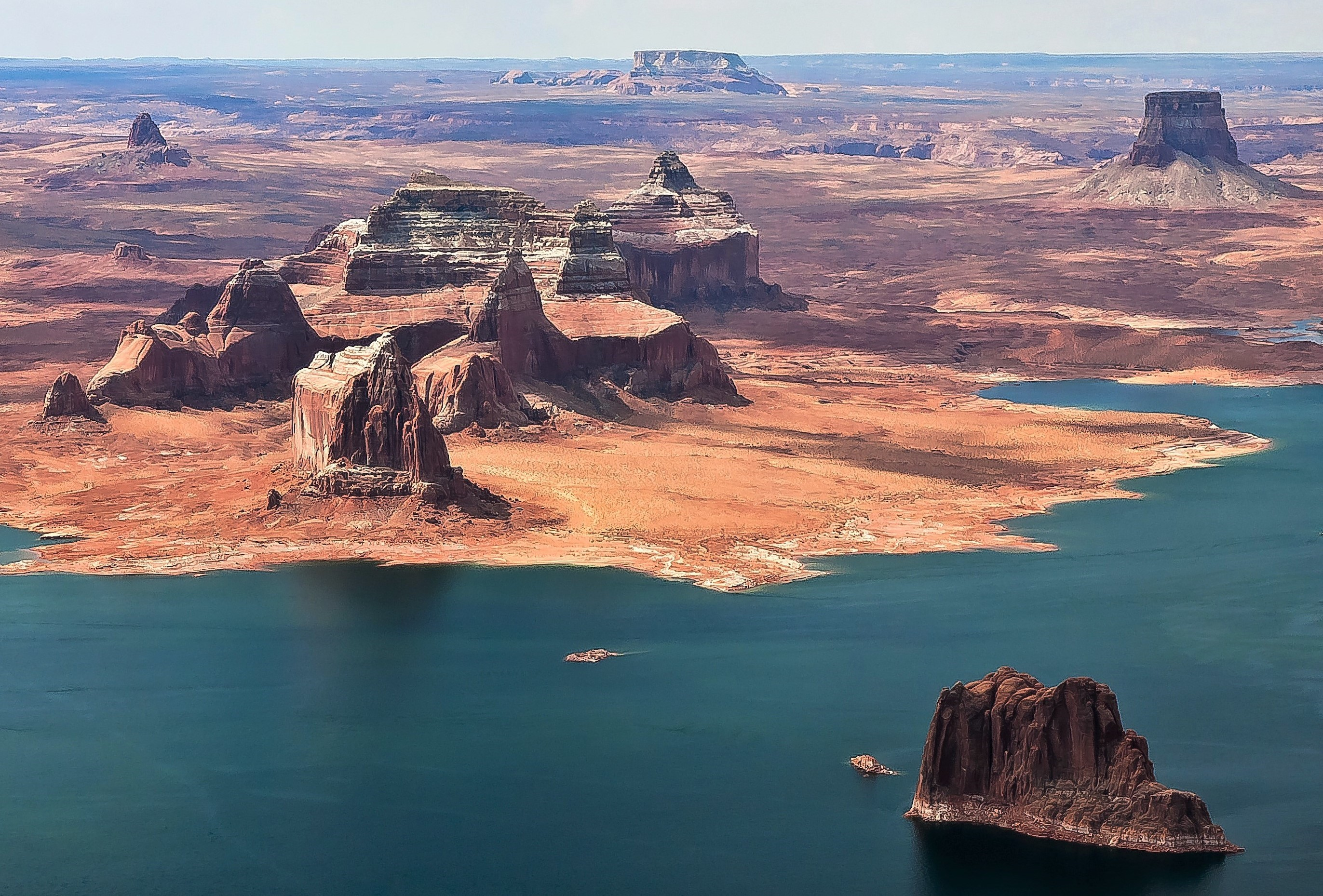
Tower Butte in upper right corner

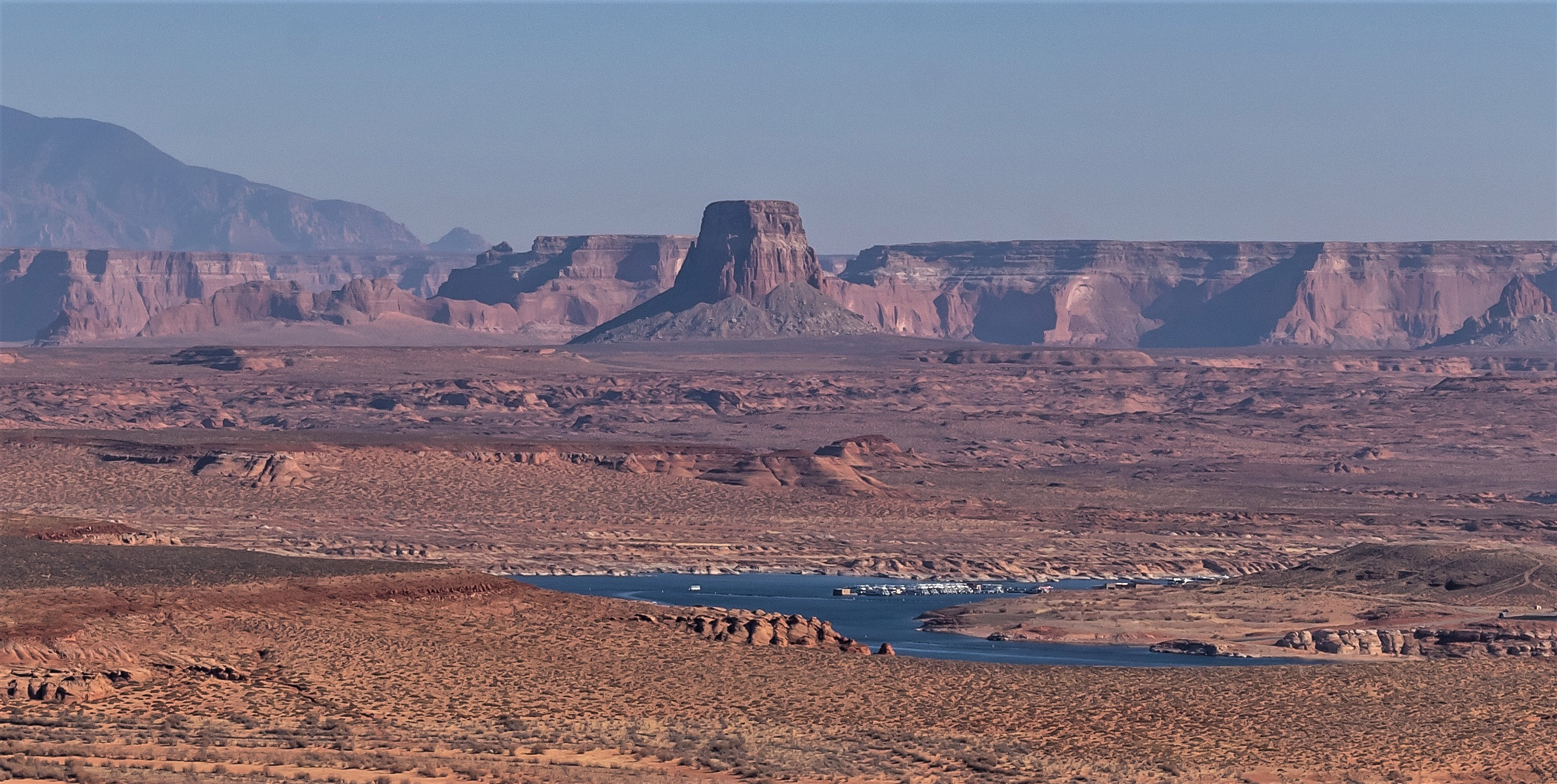

== See also ==
- Colorado Plateau
- List of rock formations in the United States
