= LeChee Rock =

Landform in Coconino County, Arizona

- Leche Benchmark
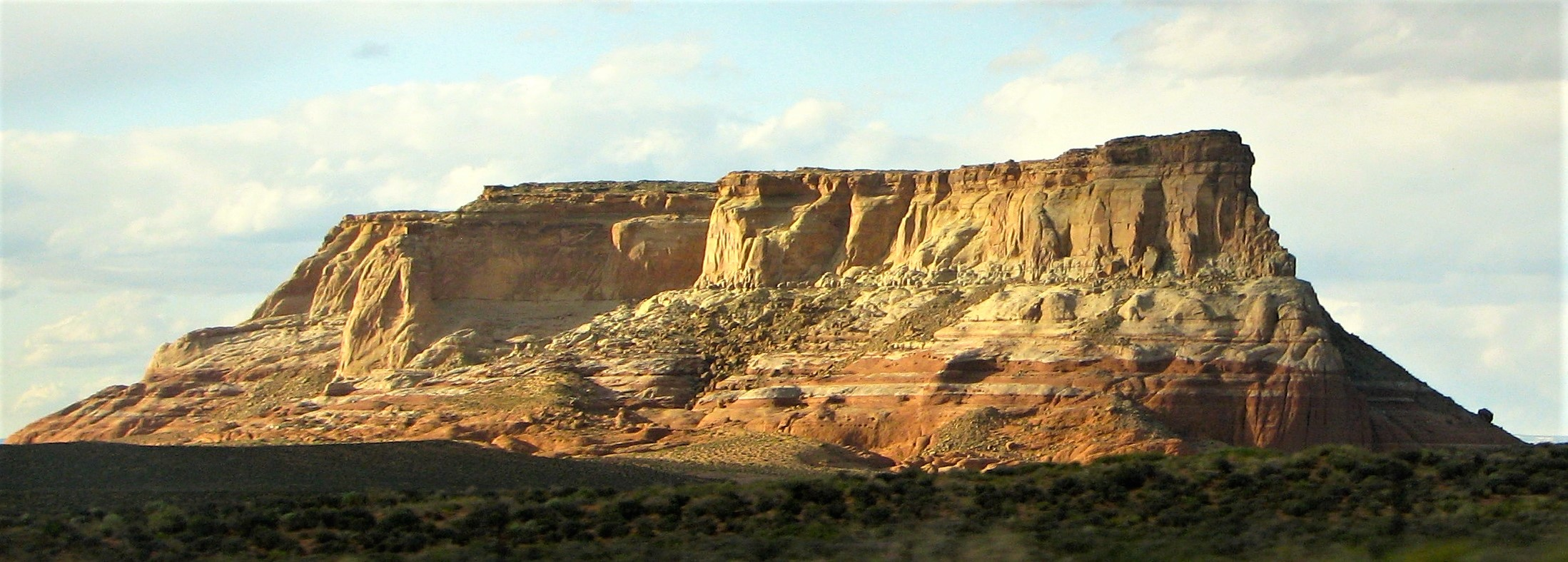
- Southwest aspect

Highest point
- Elevation: 5,900 ft (1,800 m)
- Prominence: 730 ft (220 m)
- Parent peak: Point 5940
- Isolation: 11.39 mi (18.33 km)
- Coordinates: 36°51′49″N 111°18′35″W

Geography
- Location within Arizona Location within the United States
- Location: Navajo Reservation; Coconino County, Arizona, U.S.
- Parent range: Colorado Plateau
- Topo map: USGS LeChee Rock

Geology
- Rock age: Jurassic
- Rock type: Sandstone

LeChee Rock is a 5,900-foot-elevation (1,800 m) sandstone feature located south of Lake Powell, in Coconino County of northern Arizona. It is situated nine miles (14 km) east-southeast of the town of Page, eight miles (13 km) east of the community of LeChee, and 7.5 miles (12.1 km) south of Tower Butte, on Navajo Nation land, where it towers over 900 feet (270 m) above the surrounding terrain as a landmark of the area. It can be seen from nearby Arizona State Route 98, or from as far away as Alstrom Point. LeChee (Łichíí) in Navajo language means red, referring to burgundy-colored leaves of a medicinal plant. The spelling for this geographical feature's name was officially adopted in 2004 by the U.S. Board on Geographic Names, prior to that it was officially Leche-e Rock.

== Geology ==
LeChee Rock is located in the southern edge of the Great Basin Desert on the Colorado Plateau. It is composed of Romana Sandstone overlaying the Escalante Member of Entrada Sandstone, capped by the Salt Wash Member of the Morrison Formation. Beneath the sandstone, along the base of this feature, is reddish Carmel Formation which gives this feature its name. All the strata are Jurassic in age. Precipitation runoff from this feature drains to Navajo and Antelope Canyons, then Lake Powell, all part of the Colorado River drainage basin.

== Gallery ==
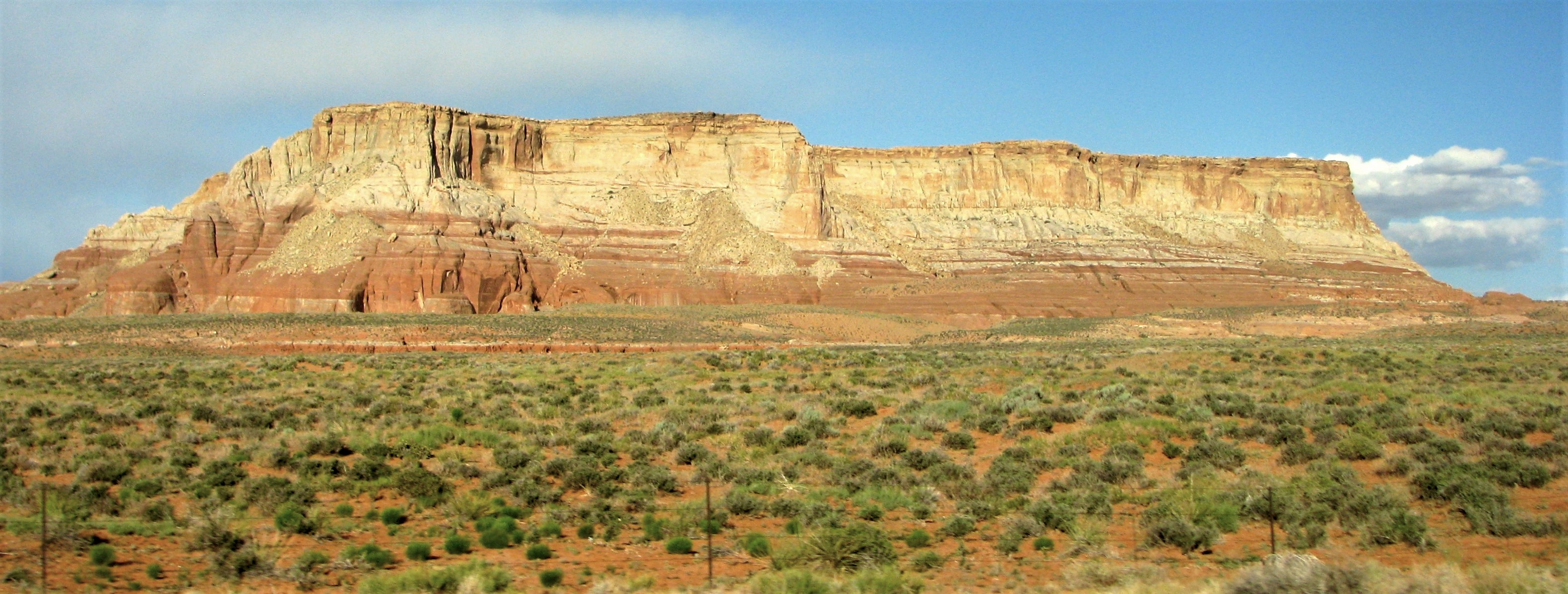
West aspect

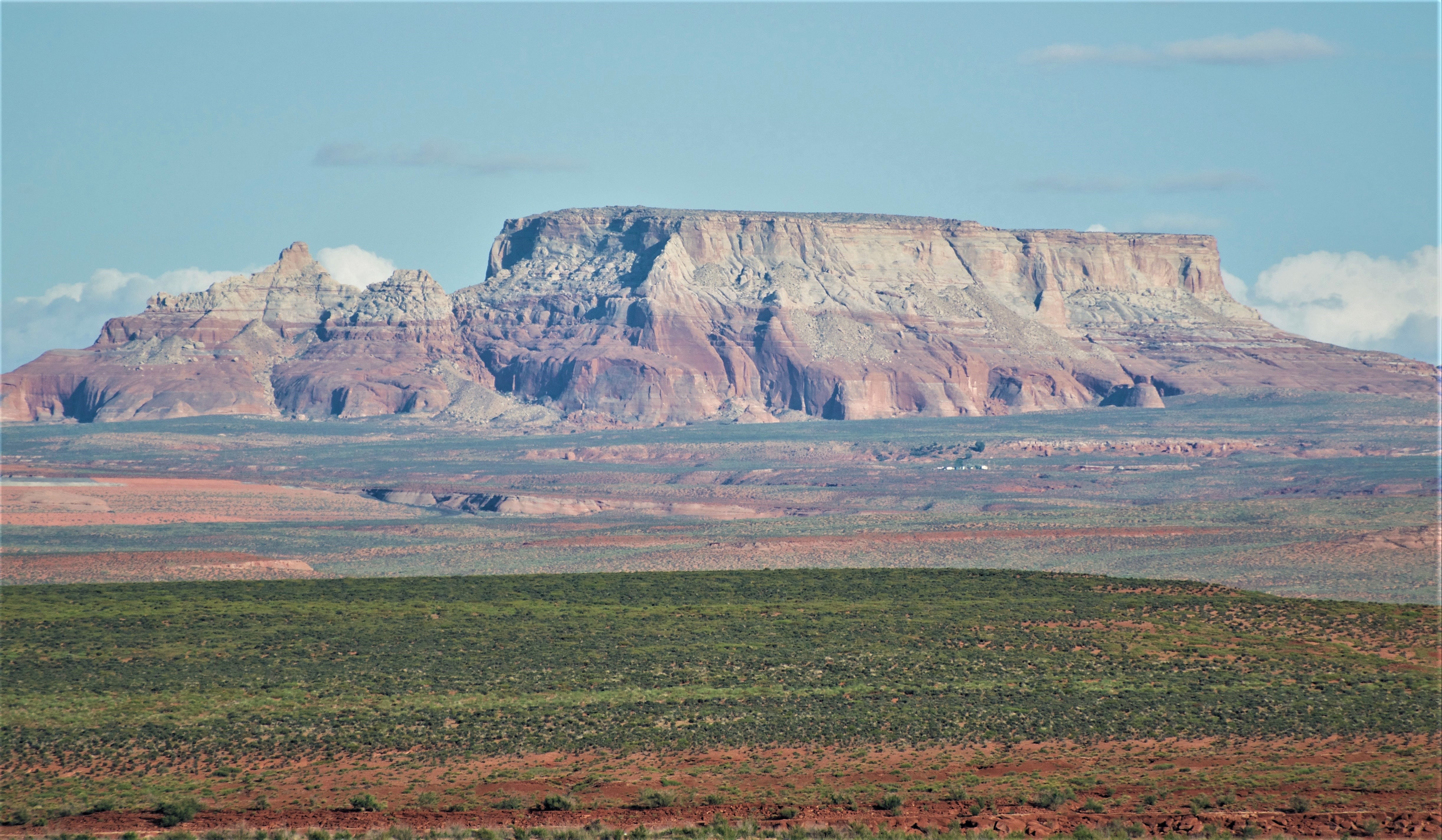
Northwest aspect

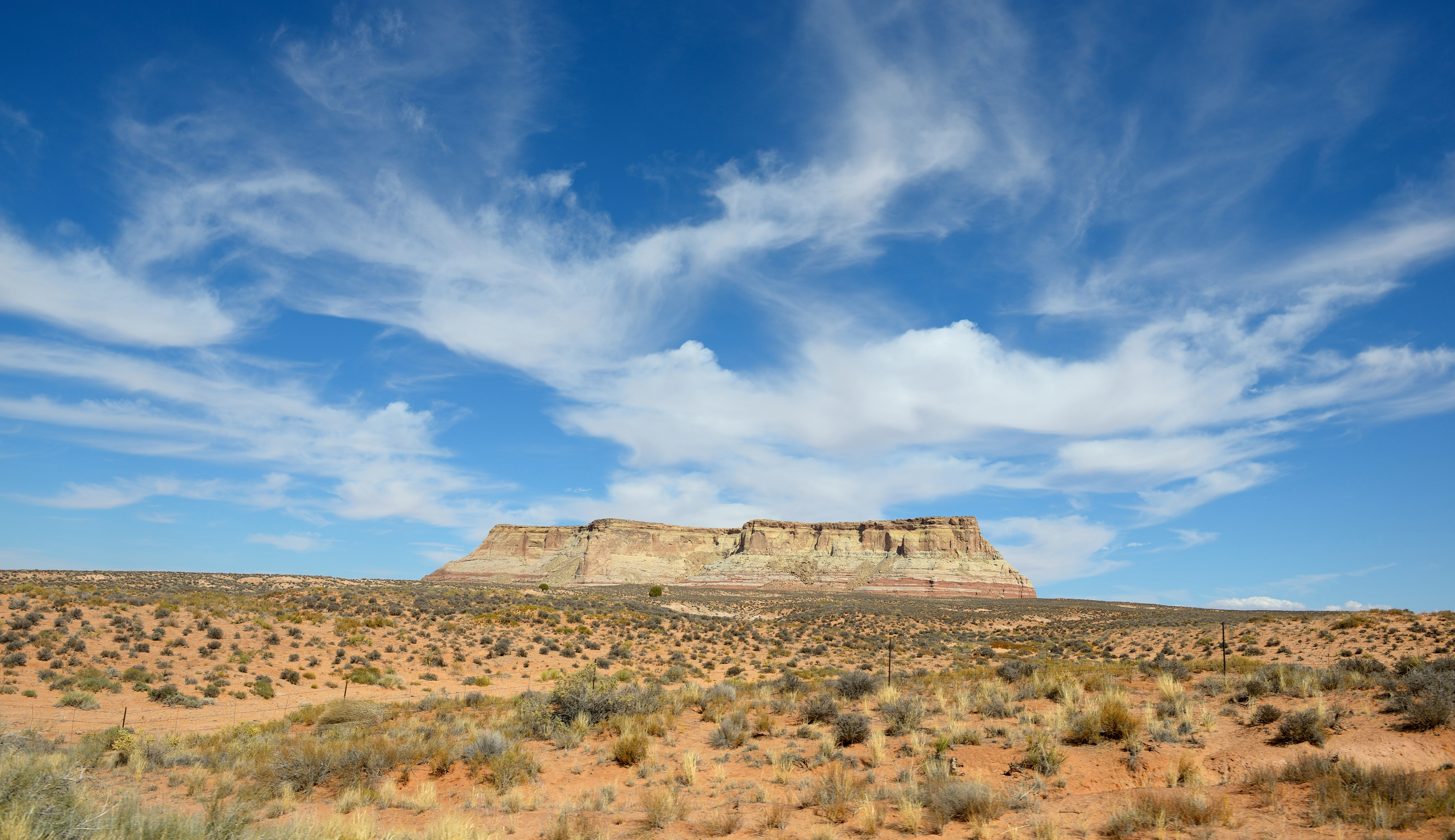

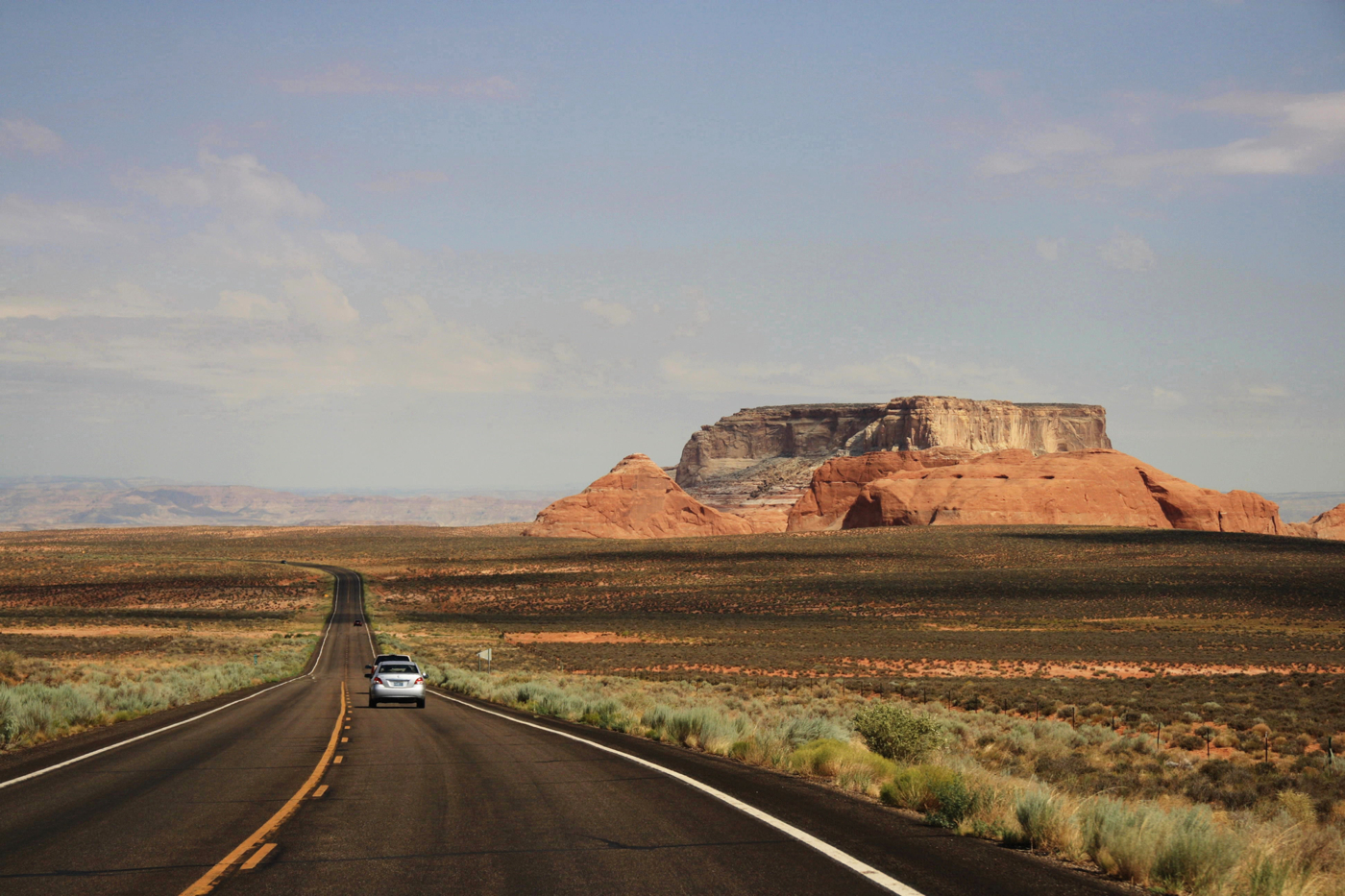
South aspect from Highway 98

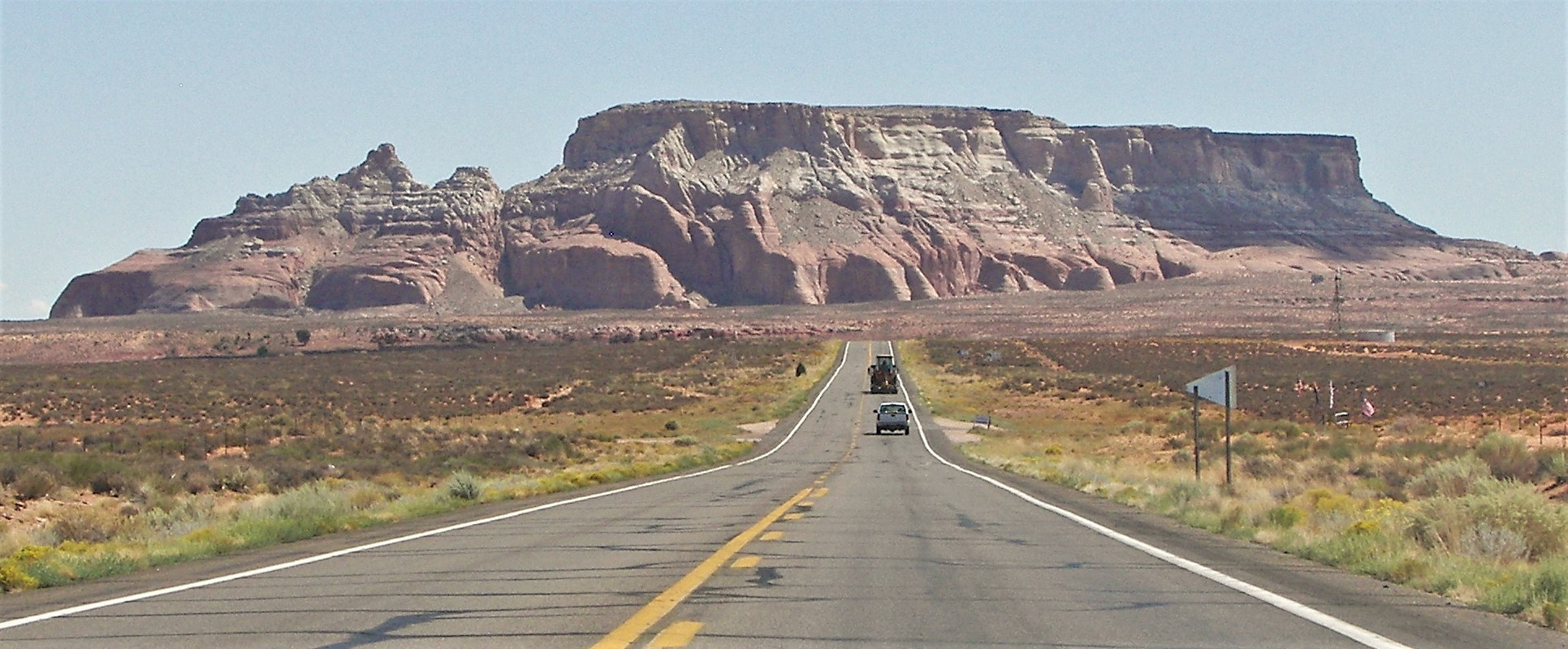
Northwest aspect from Highway 98

== Climate ==
According to the Köppen climate classification system, LeChee Rock is located in an arid climate zone with hot, very dry summers, and chilly winters with very little snow. Spring and fall are the most favorable seasons to visit.

Climate data for Page, Arizona
Month	Jan	Feb	Mar	Apr	May	Jun	Jul	Aug	Sep	Oct	Nov	Dec	Year
Record high °F (°C)	64 (18)	72 (22)	82 (28)	91 (33)	102 (39)	107 (42)	109 (43)	106 (41)	100 (38)	93 (34)	77 (25)	66 (19)	109 (43)
Mean daily maximum °F (°C)	43.1 (6.2)	50.3 (10.2)	59.5 (15.3)	68.5 (20.3)	78.5 (25.8)	90.2 (32.3)	95.1 (35.1)	92.0 (33.3)	83.5 (28.6)	69.7 (20.9)	53.8 (12.1)	43.7 (6.5)	69.0 (20.6)
Mean daily minimum °F (°C)	26.3 (−3.2)	30.4 (−0.9)	37.0 (2.8)	43.6 (6.4)	52.6 (11.4)	62.3 (16.8)	68.3 (20.2)	66.4 (19.1)	58.4 (14.7)	46.6 (8.1)	34.7 (1.5)	27.1 (−2.7)	46.1 (7.8)
Record low °F (°C)	−11 (−24)	6 (−14)	18 (−8)	25 (−4)	31 (−1)	44 (7)	56 (13)	46 (8)	40 (4)	24 (−4)	16 (−9)	1 (−17)	−11 (−24)
Average precipitation inches (mm)	0.61 (15)	0.48 (12)	0.65 (17)	0.50 (13)	0.40 (10)	0.14 (3.6)	0.58 (15)	0.69 (18)	0.66 (17)	0.99 (25)	0.56 (14)	0.48 (12)	6.74 (171.6)
Average snowfall inches (cm)	2.1 (5.3)	1.2 (3.0)	0.2 (0.51)	0 (0)	0 (0)	0 (0)	0 (0)	0 (0)	0 (0)	0 (0)	0.5 (1.3)	1.4 (3.6)	5.4 (13.71)
Average precipitation days (≥ 0.01 in)	4.5	4.0	5.2	3.5	3.2	1.7	4.6	5.2	4.5	4.3	3.2	3.9	47.8
Average snowy days (≥ 0.1 in)	0.9	0.6	0.3	0	0	0	0	0	0	0	0.2	0.6	2.6
Source: NOAA

== See also ==
- Colorado Plateau
- List of rock formations in the United States
