= Gregory Natural Bridge =

Coordinates: 37°19′47.10″N 110°56′19.60″W

Gregory Natural Bridge is a typically submerged natural arch that exists at Lake Powell in Utah. Before it was submerged in 1969, it had a span of 127 feet. Due to a long term regional drought, in 2021 the bridge was no longer submerged for the first time since the initial filling of the reservoir.
