= Castle Rock (Kane County, Utah) =

Peak in Kane County, Utah, United States

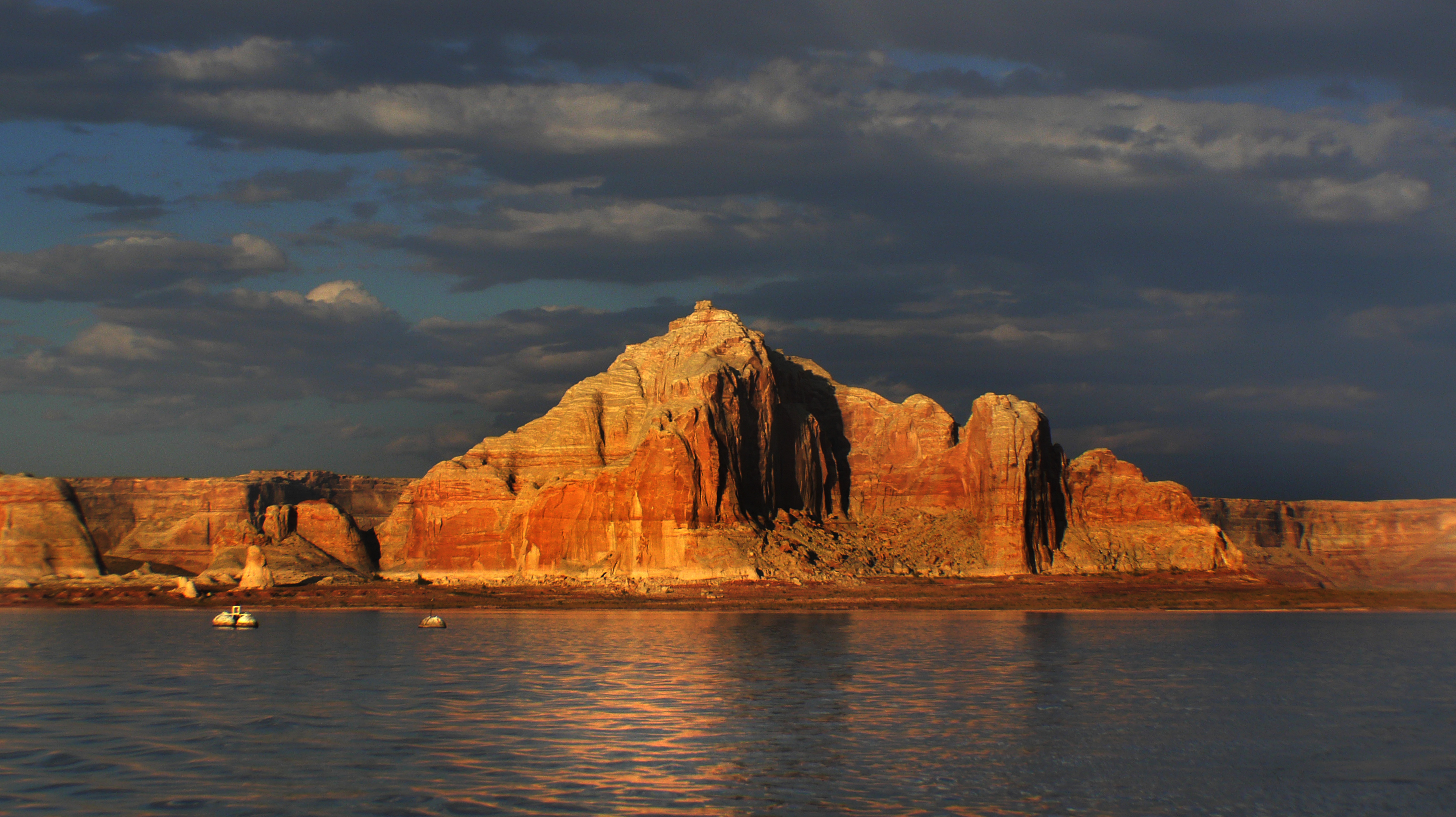
- Southwest aspect

Highest point
- Elevation: 4,321 ft (1,317 m)
- Prominence: 701 ft (214 m)
- Parent peak: Point 4380
- Isolation: 1.63 mi (2.62 km)
- Coordinates: 37°00′56″N 111°27′21″W

Geography
- Location within Utah Location within the United States
- Location: Glen Canyon National Recreation Area; Kane County, Utah, U.S.
- Parent range: Colorado Plateau
- Topo map: USGS Warm Creek Bay

Geology
- Rock age: Jurassic
- Rock type: Entrada Sandstone

Castle Rock is a 4,321-foot (1,317 meter) elevation sandstone summit located in Glen Canyon National Recreation Area, in Kane County of southern Utah. It is situated 6.5 miles (10.5 km) north of the town of Page, and 2.5 miles (4.0 km) northeast of the Wahweap marina. Castle Rock towers over 600 feet above Lake Powell, and becomes an island when the lake is full. This iconic landmark of the Lake Powell area is composed primarily of Entrada Sandstone. This sandstone, which was originally deposited as sandy mud on a tidal flat, is believed to have formed about 160 million years ago during the Jurassic period as a giant sand sea, the largest in Earth's history.

== Climate ==
According to the Köppen climate classification system, Castle Rock is located in an arid climate zone with hot, very dry summers, and chilly winters with very little snow. Spring and fall are the most favorable seasons to visit.

These data are for the Wahweap climate station on Lake Powell, two miles southwest of Castle Rock.

Climate data for Wahweap, AZ
Month	Jan	Feb	Mar	Apr	May	Jun	Jul	Aug	Sep	Oct	Nov	Dec	Year
Record high °F (°C)	69 (21)	78 (26)	85 (29)	94 (34)	104 (40)	110 (43)	120 (49)	115 (46)	105 (41)	96 (36)	80 (27)	70 (21)	120 (49)
Mean daily maximum °F (°C)	47.2 (8.4)	53.8 (12.1)	63.0 (17.2)	72.8 (22.7)	83.8 (28.8)	94.1 (34.5)	98.8 (37.1)	95.7 (35.4)	87.7 (30.9)	73.7 (23.2)	58.3 (14.6)	47.1 (8.4)	73.0 (22.8)
Mean daily minimum °F (°C)	26.9 (−2.8)	31.8 (−0.1)	37.8 (3.2)	44.6 (7.0)	54.9 (12.7)	64.1 (17.8)	71.3 (21.8)	69.3 (20.7)	60.7 (15.9)	48.9 (9.4)	36.9 (2.7)	27.4 (−2.6)	47.9 (8.8)
Record low °F (°C)	−2 (−19)	4 (−16)	21 (−6)	16 (−9)	29 (−2)	40 (4)	48 (9)	51 (11)	36 (2)	24 (−4)	15 (−9)	3 (−16)	−2 (−19)
Average precipitation inches (mm)	0.59 (15)	0.56 (14)	0.63 (16)	0.37 (9.4)	0.36 (9.1)	0.17 (4.3)	0.51 (13)	0.75 (19)	0.59 (15)	0.85 (22)	0.57 (14)	0.41 (10)	6.36 (160.8)
Average snowfall inches (cm)	0.2 (0.51)	0.2 (0.51)	0 (0)	0 (0)	0 (0)	0 (0)	0 (0)	0 (0)	0 (0)	0 (0)	0 (0)	0.3 (0.76)	0.7 (1.78)
Source: http://www.wrcc.dri.edu/cgi-bin/cliMAIN.pl?az9114

== Gallery ==
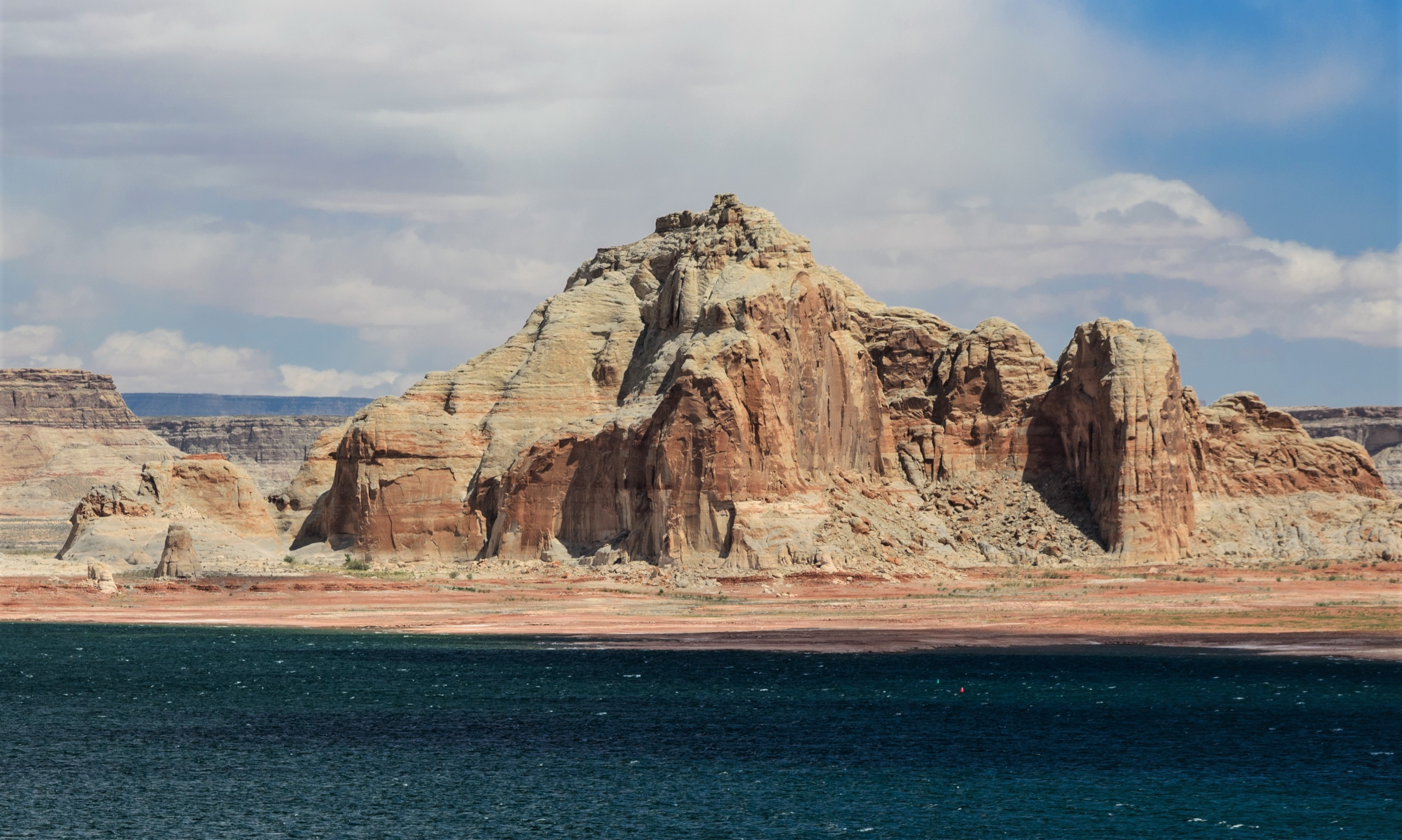
From southwest

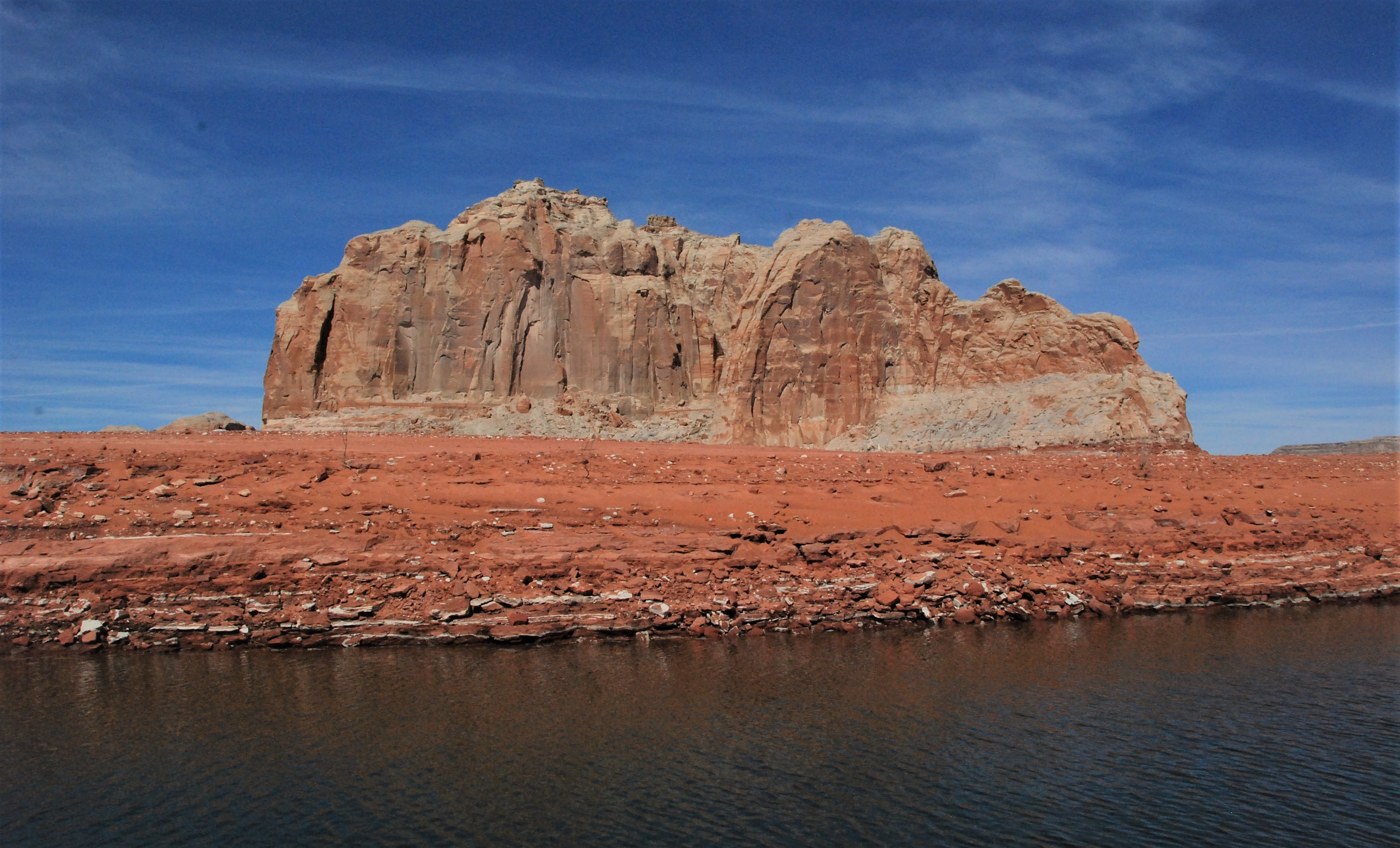
South aspect, from Castle Rock Cut

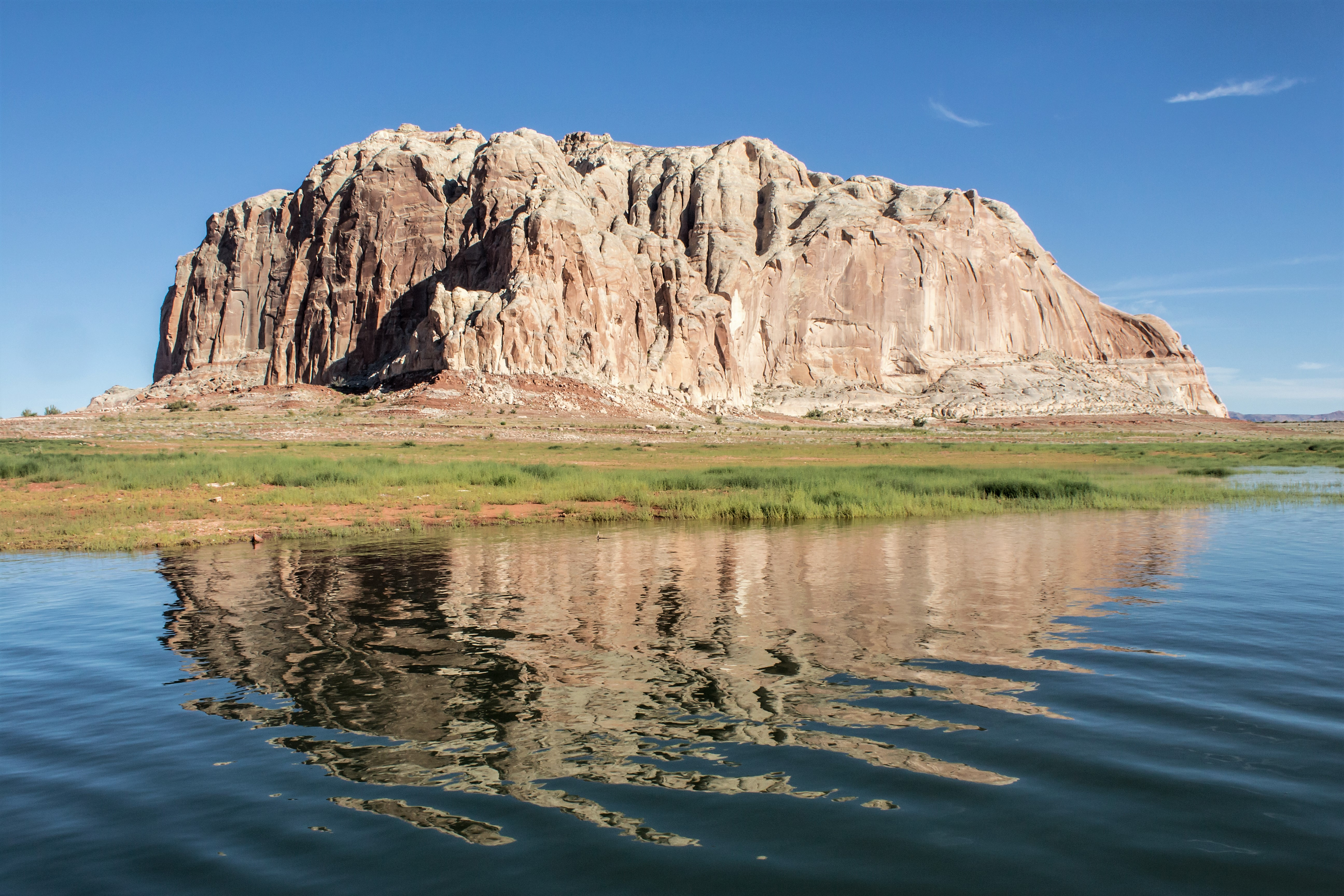
from west

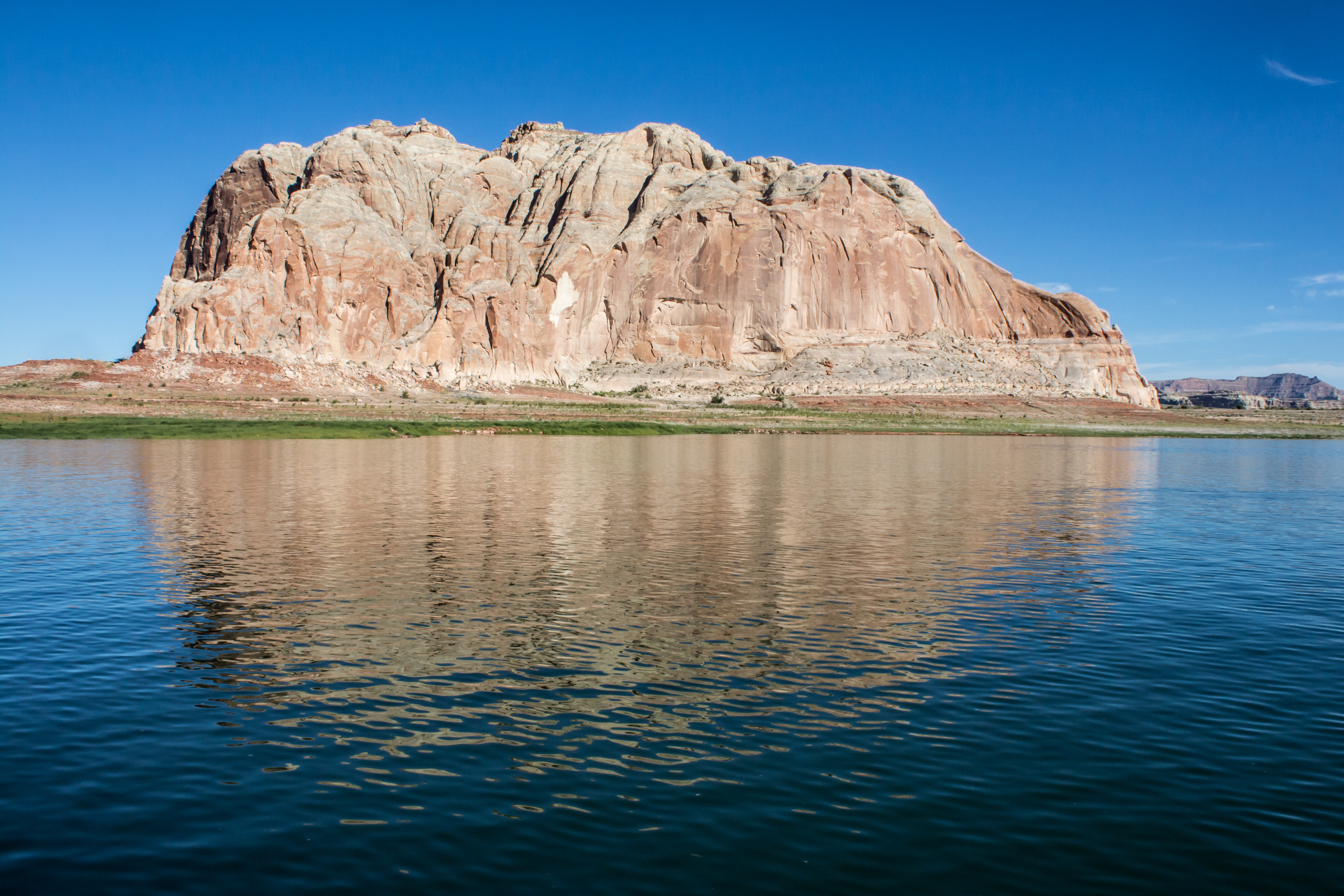

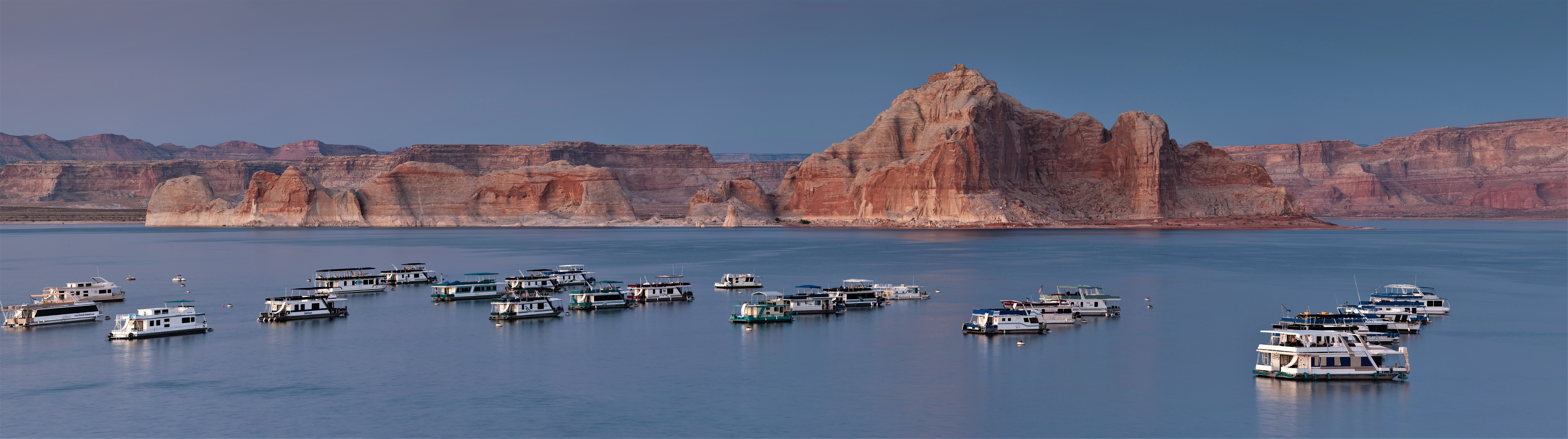

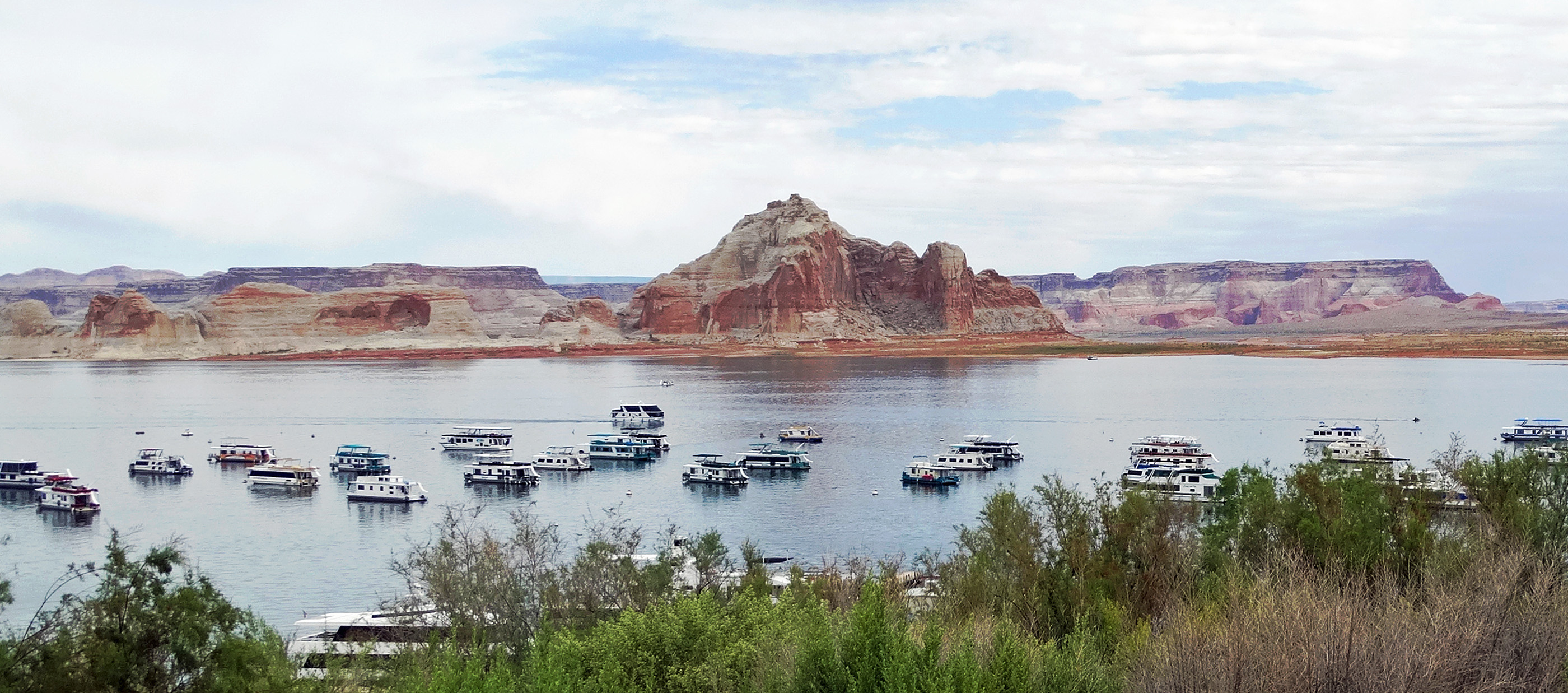

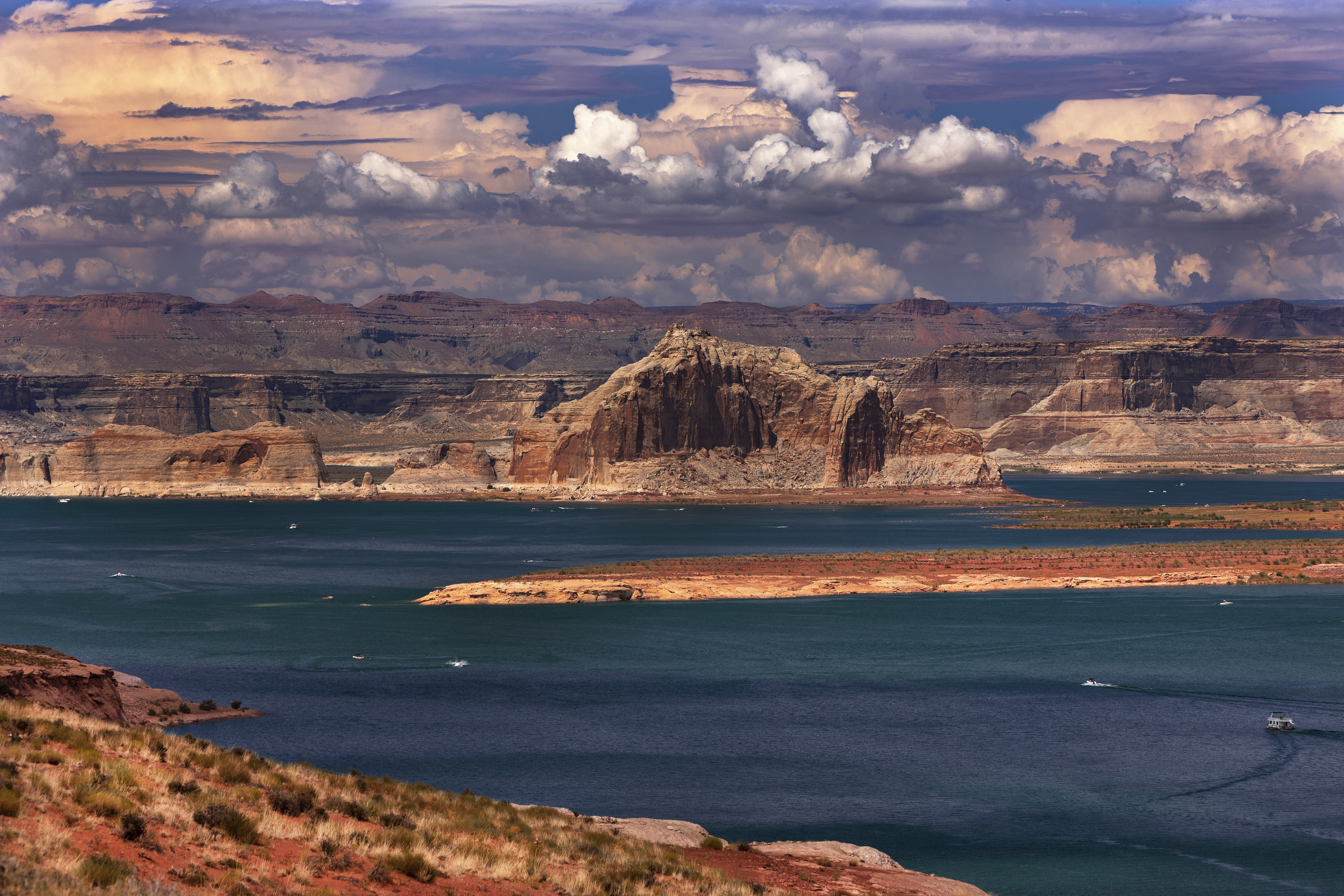

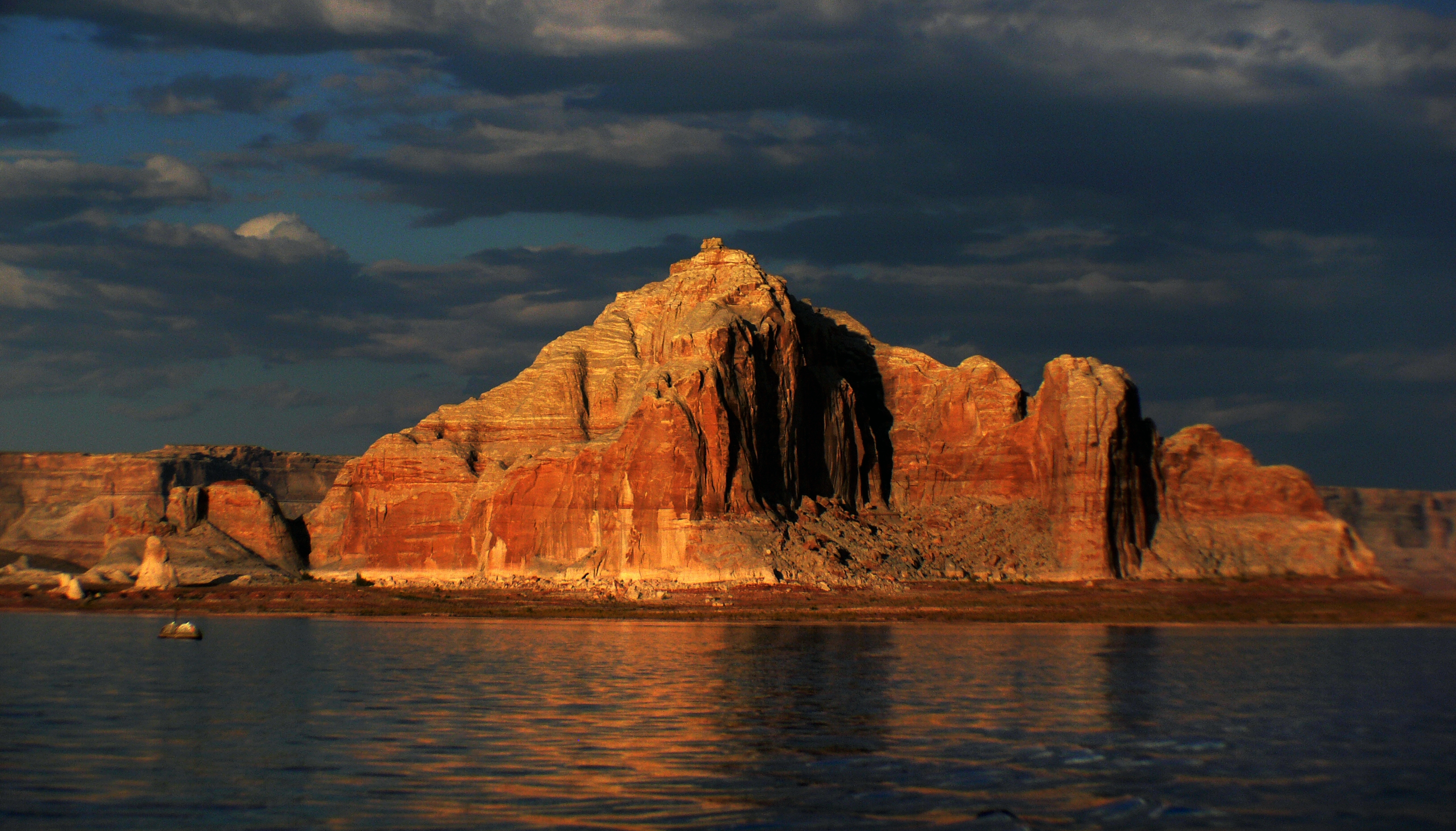

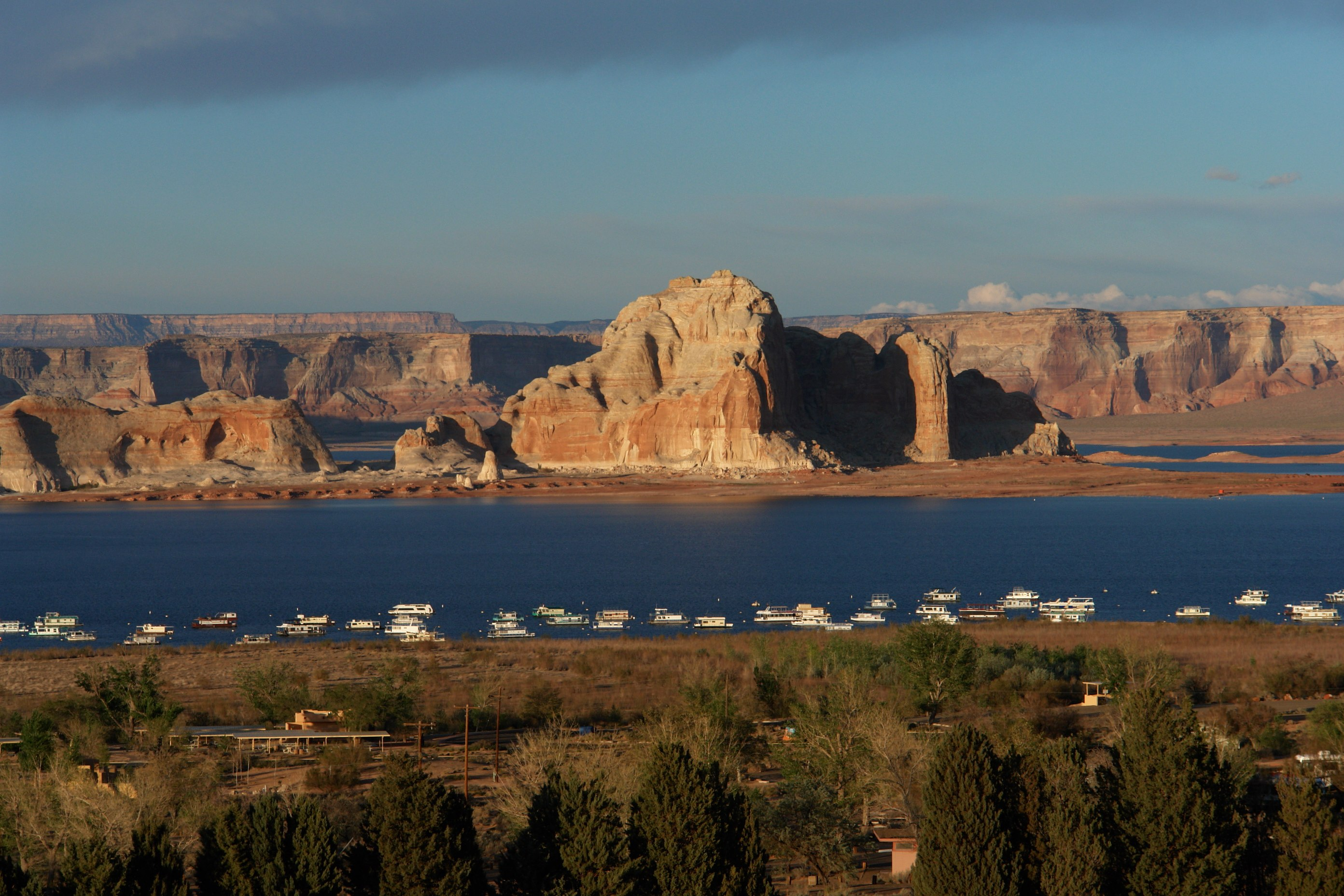

== See also ==
- Colorado Plateau
- List of rock formations in the United States
