= Lone Rock (Glen Canyon National Recreation Area) =

Coordinates: 37.027215°N 111.534366°W

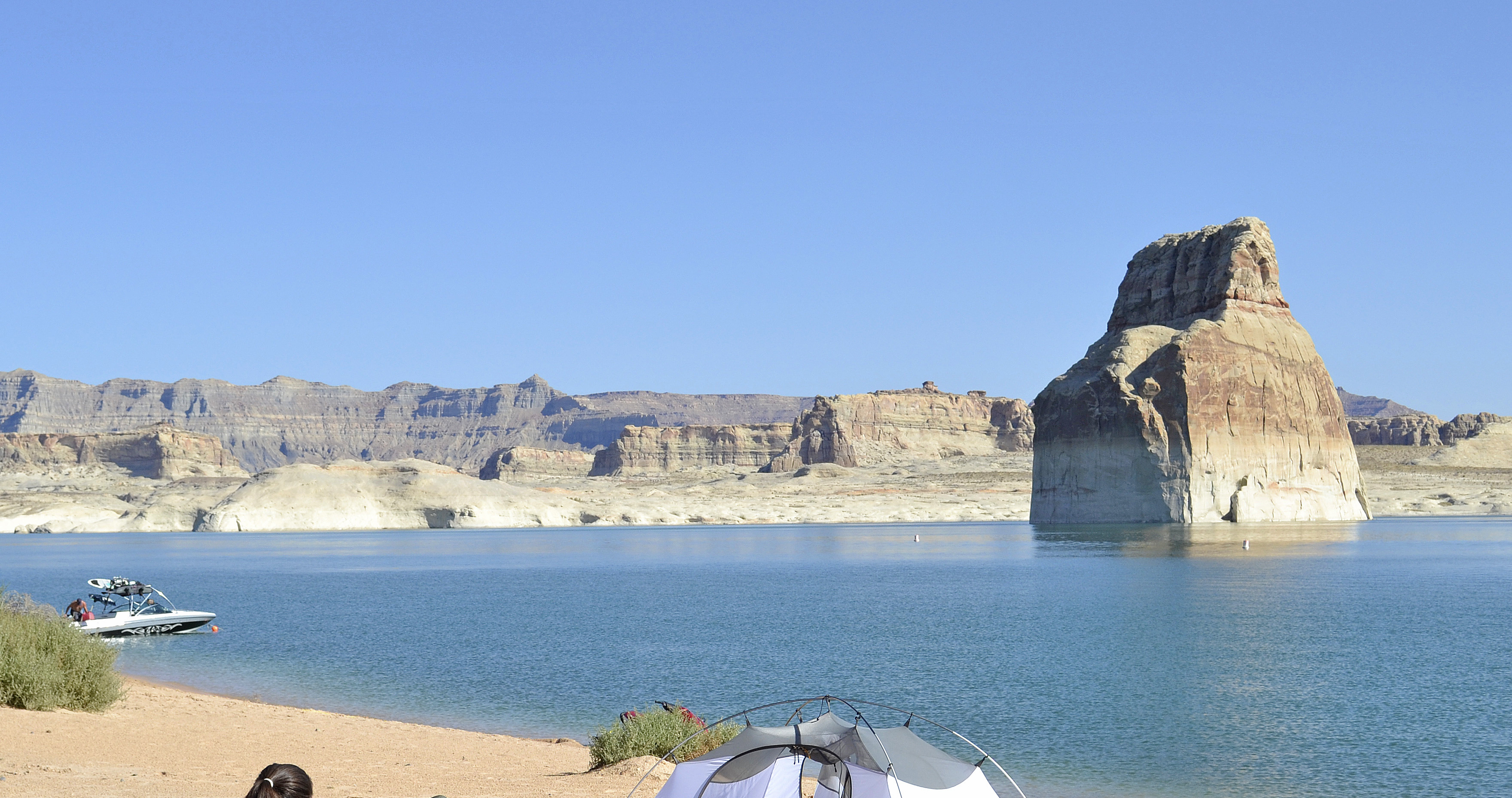
Lone Rock seen from the Lone Rock Beach Campground

Lone Rock is a solitary rock in Wahweap Bay in Lake Powell in Glen Canyon Recreation Area less than 10 miles (16 km) from Glen Canyon Dam. It is located within Kane County, Utah, United States.

Facing Lone Rock is the Lone Rock Campground accessed from Route 89. The beach is one of the few places in Glen Canyon Recreation Area where people can drive right to the water's edge.

It was used as a filming location for the Doctor Who story "The Impossible Astronaut", the first episode of the sixth series, broadcast in April 2011.
