= Gregory Butte =

Butte in Utah, United States

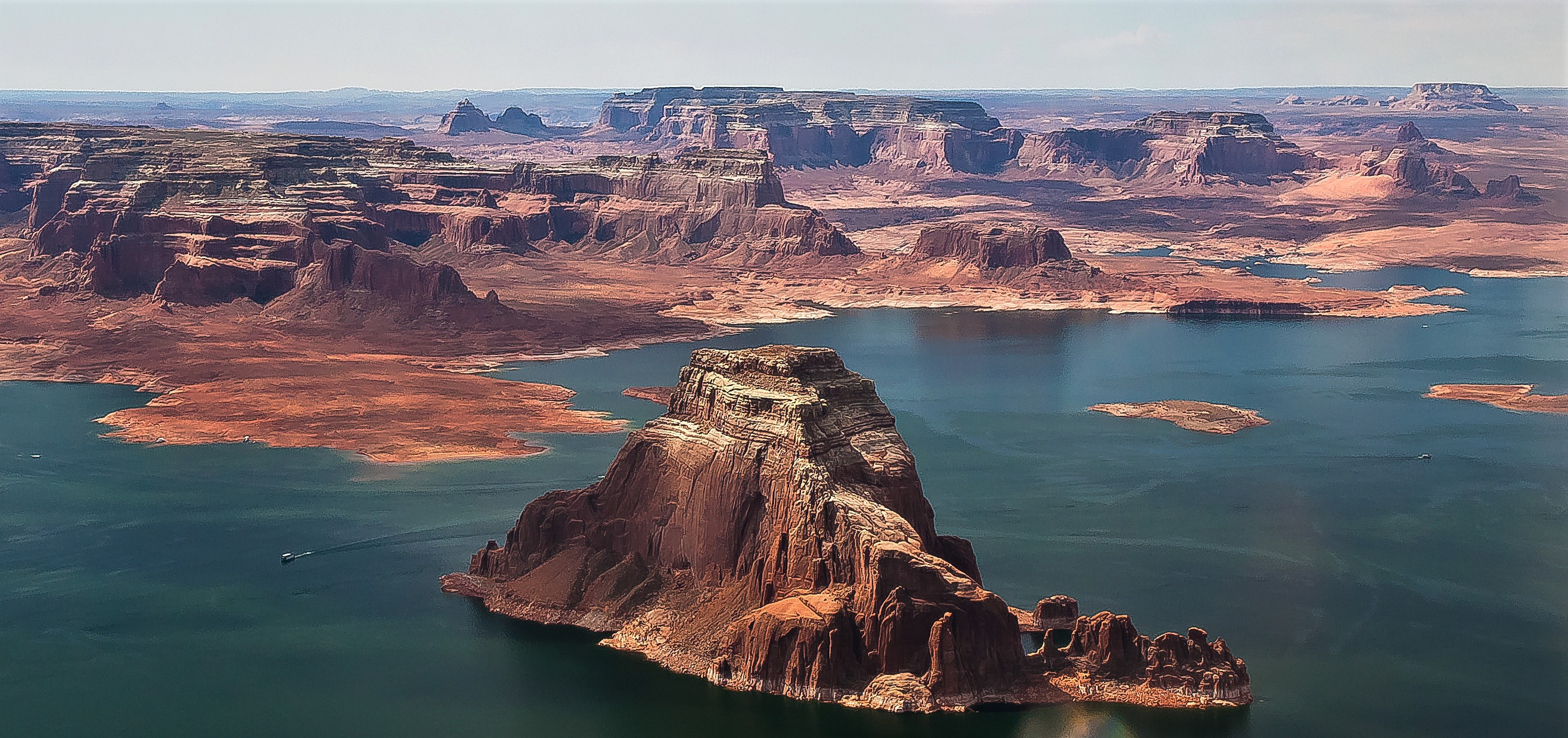
- Aerial view of north aspect

Highest point
- Elevation: 4,651 ft (1,418 m)
- Prominence: 1,011 ft (308 m)
- Parent peak: Point 5246
- Isolation: 1.55 mi (2.49 km)
- Coordinates: 37°03′16″N 111°13′48″W

Naming
- Etymology: Herbert E. Gregory

Geography
- Location within Utah Location within the United States
- Country: United States
- State: Utah
- County: San Juan
- Protected area: Glen Canyon National Recreation Area
- Parent range: Colorado Plateau
- Topo map: USGS Gregory Butte

Geology
- Rock age: Jurassic
- Rock type: Entrada Sandstone

Climbing
- Easiest route: class 5.x climbing

Gregory Butte is a 4,651-foot (1,418 meter) elevation sandstone summit located in Glen Canyon National Recreation Area, in San Juan County of southern Utah. It is situated 7.3 miles (11.7 km) northeast of Tower Butte, and 16 miles (26 km) northeast of the town of Page. This iconic landmark of the Lake Powell area towers nearly 1,000 feet above the lake. Before Lake Powell was formed in the 1970s, this butte was set within a meander of the Colorado River. Gregory Butte is a butte composed of Entrada Sandstone. This sandstone, which was originally deposited as sandy mud on a tidal flat, is believed to have formed about 160 million years ago during the Jurassic period as a giant sand sea, the largest in Earth's history. This geographical feature's name was officially adopted in 1977 by the U.S. Board on Geographic Names. Geologist Herbert E. Gregory (1869–1952), mapped much of the bedrock geology of the Colorado Plateau, particularly in geologic monographs concentrating on what is now Navajo Nation land in northern Arizona and southern Utah where this butte is located. According to the Köppen climate classification system, Gregory Butte is located in an arid climate zone with hot, very dry summers, and chilly winters with very little snow.

== See also ==
- Colorado Plateau
- List of rock formations in the United States

== Gallery ==
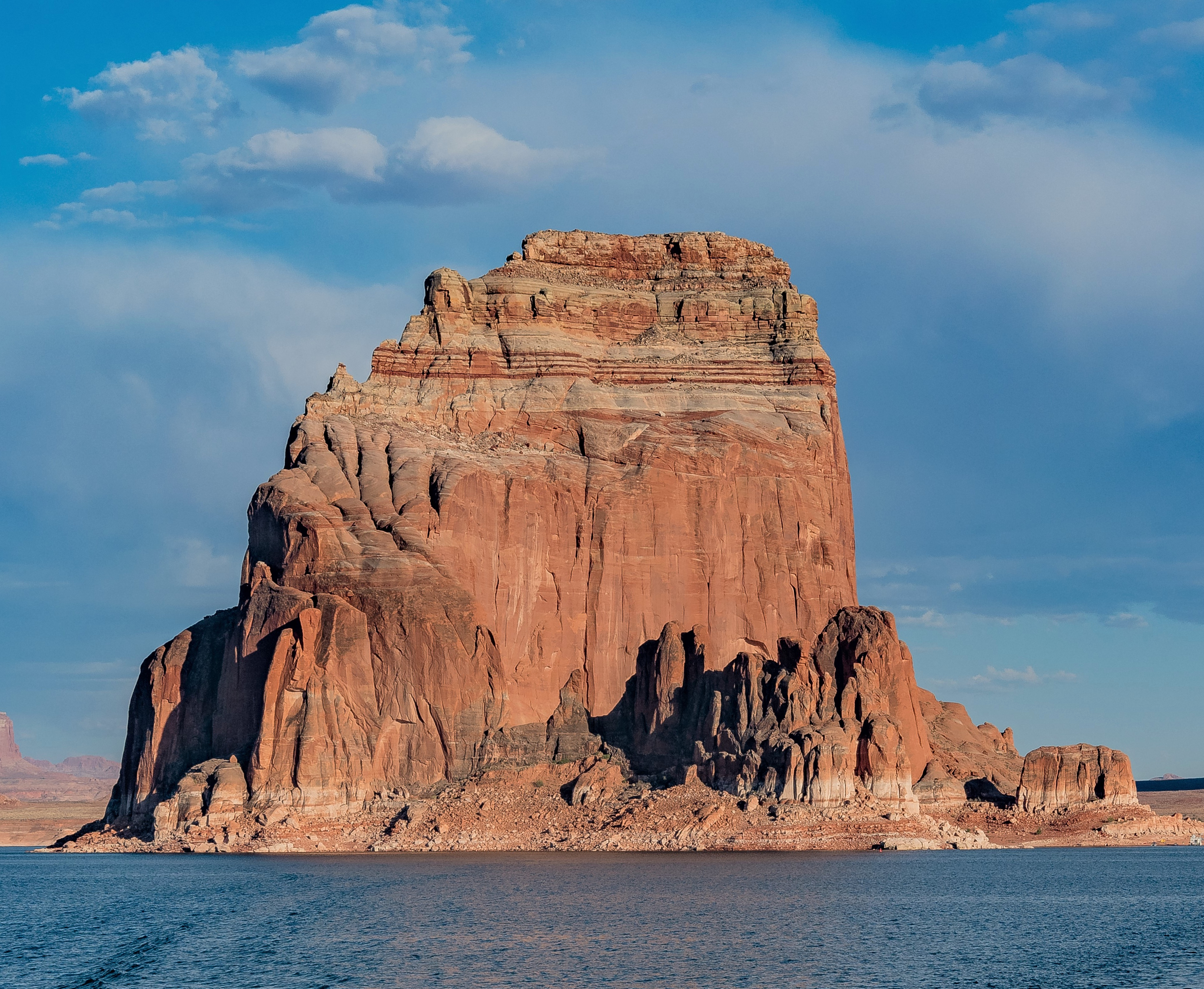

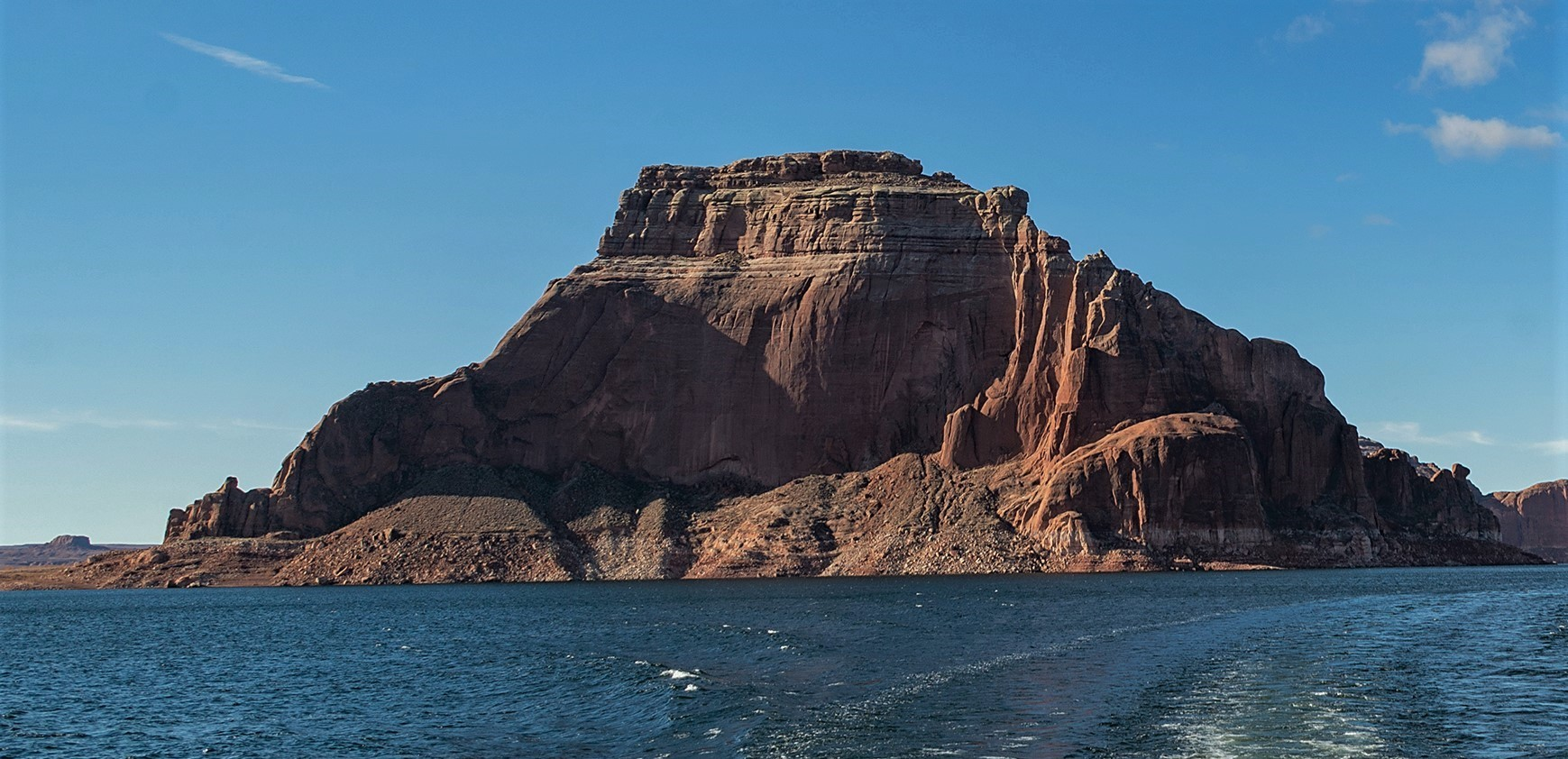
Northeast aspect

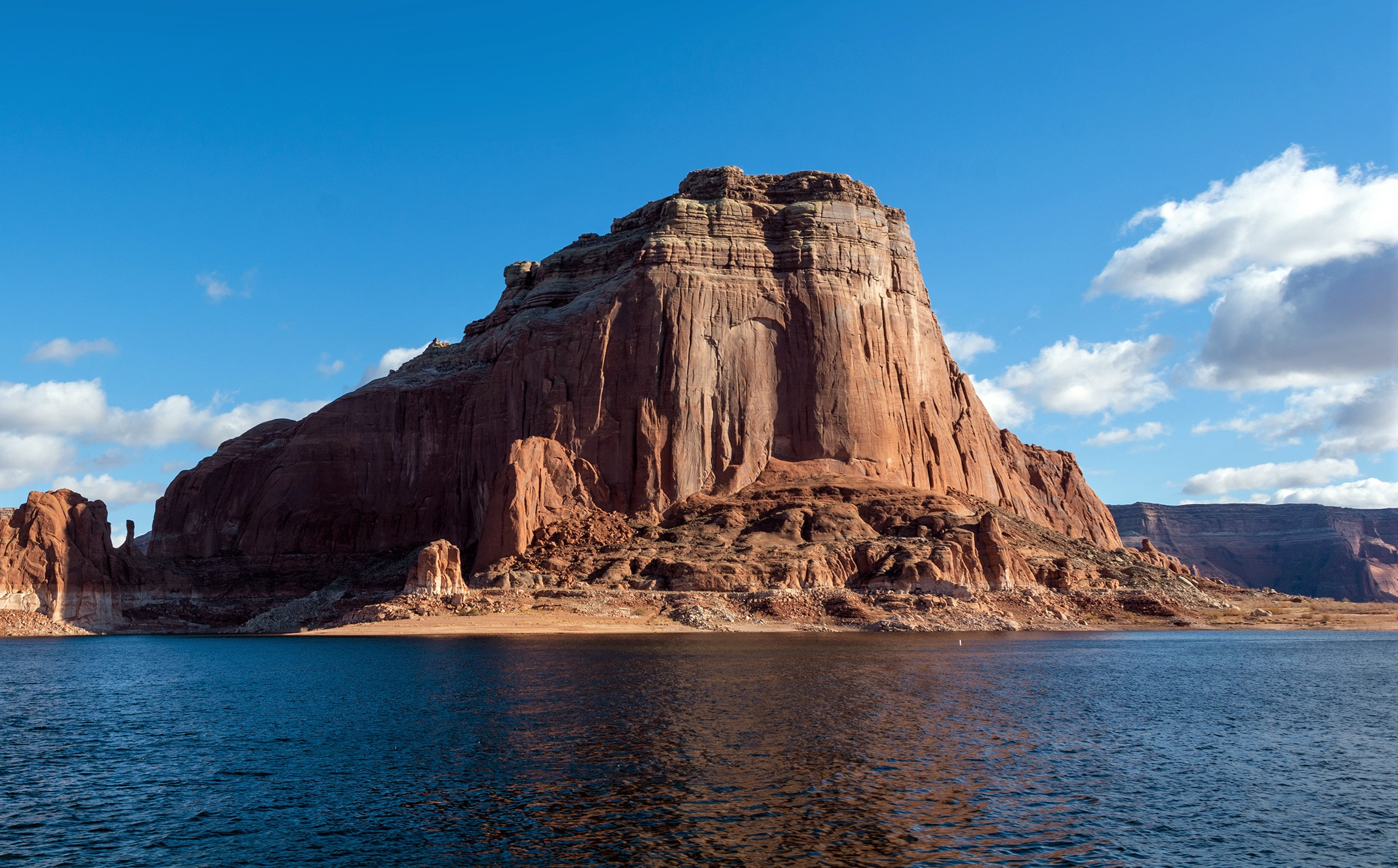

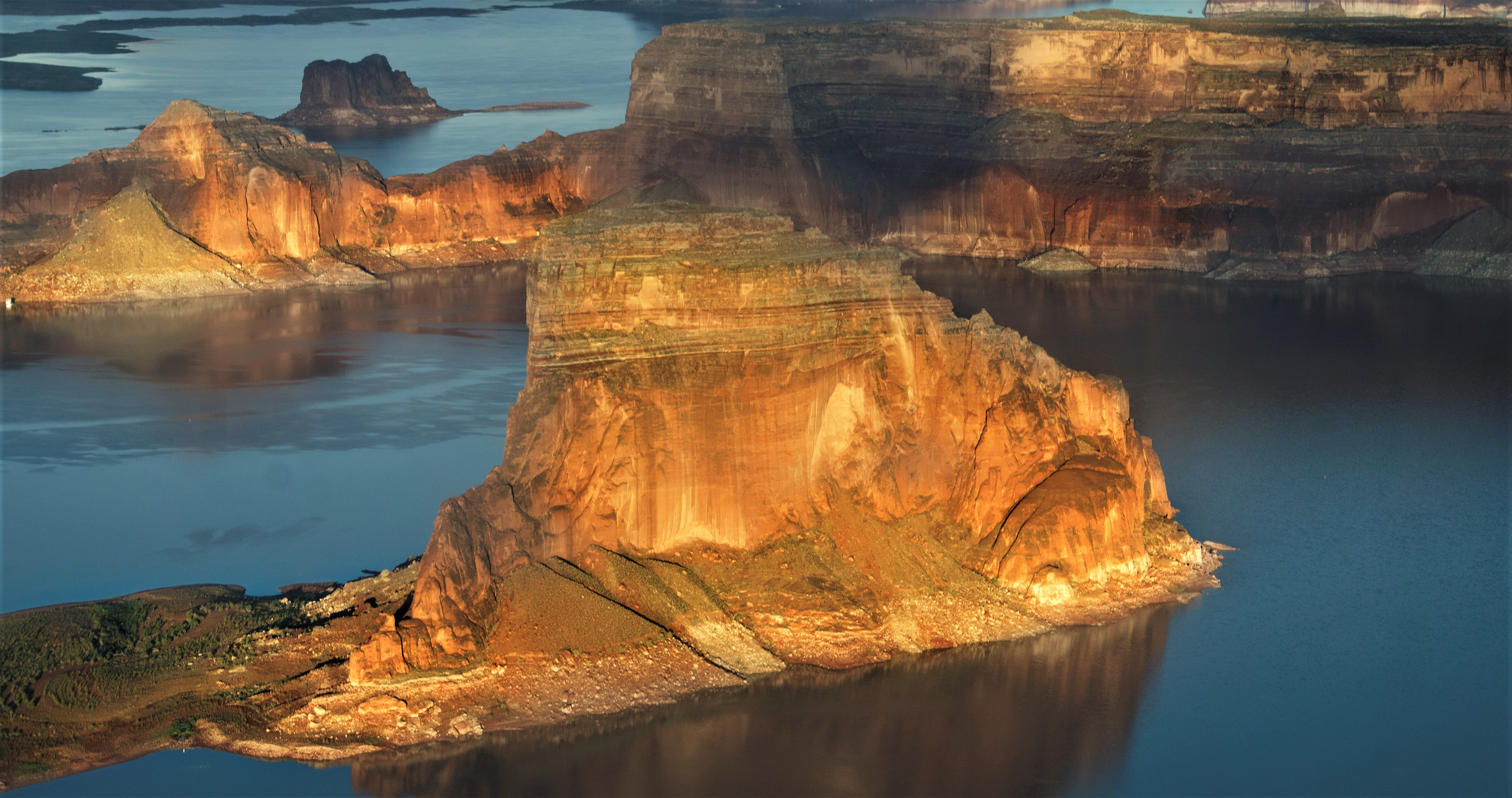
Aerial view from east

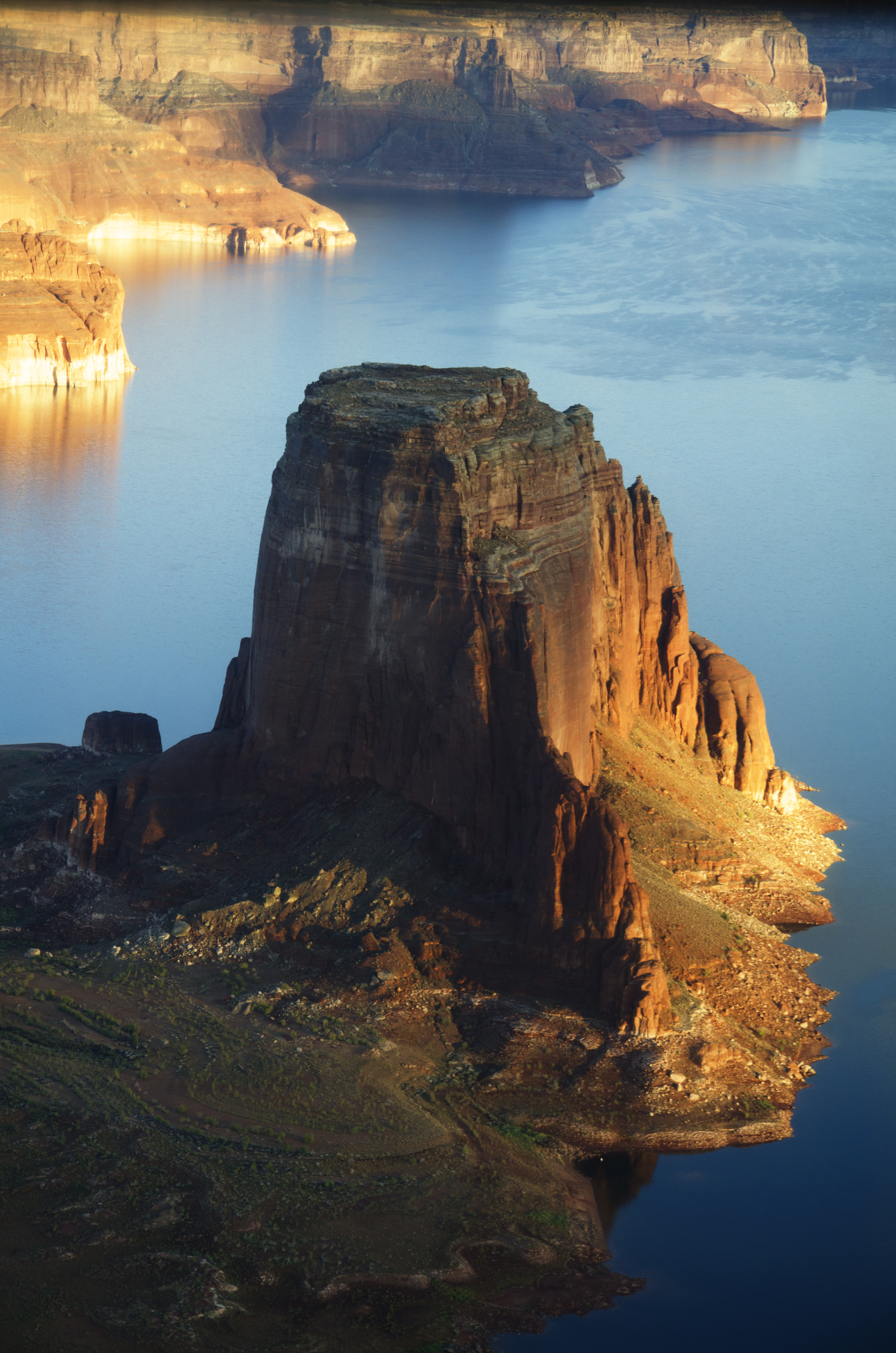
Aerial view from southeast

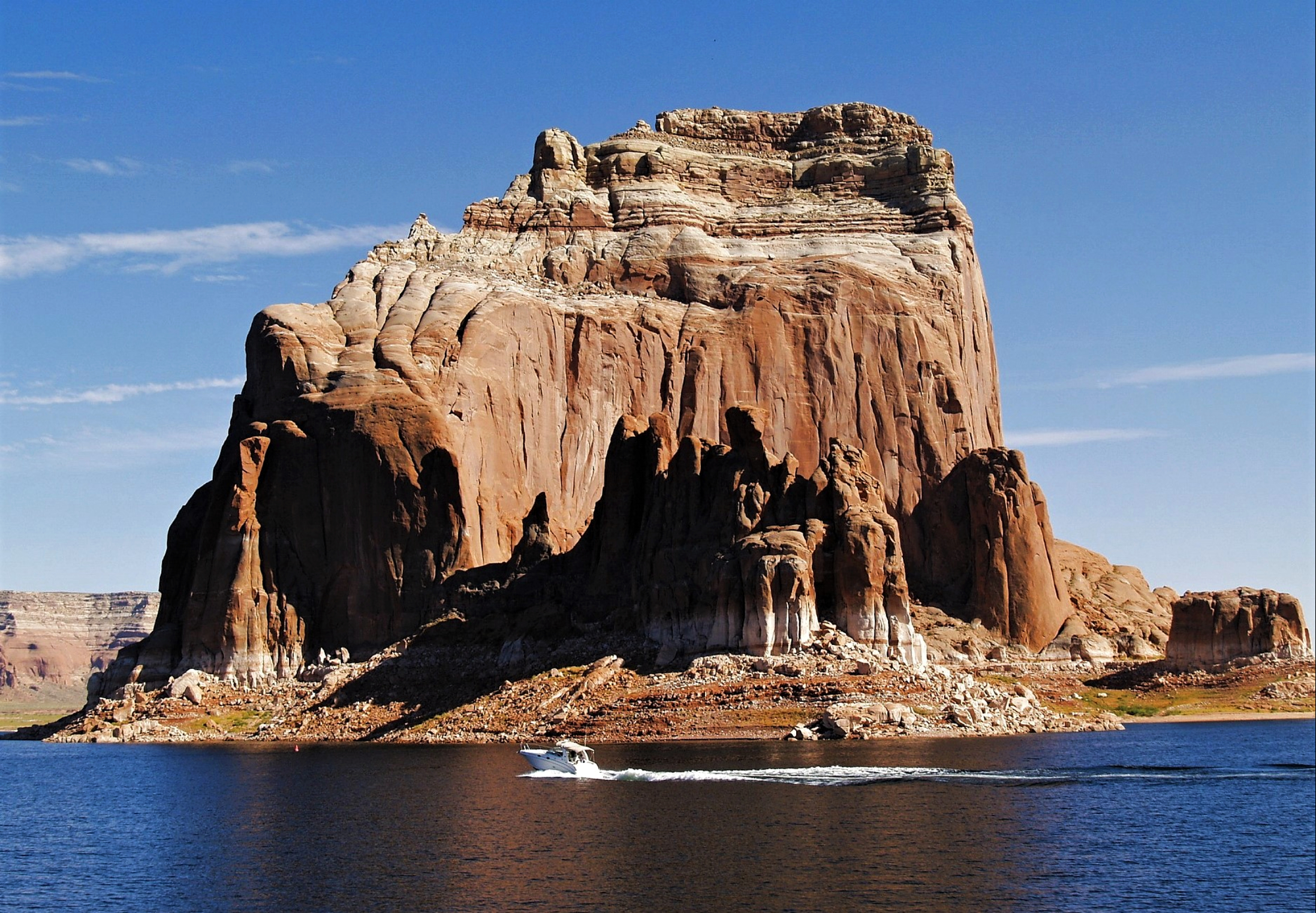
