= Cathedral in the Desert =

Natural formation in Utah, United States

Coordinates: 37.288306°N 110.9155°W

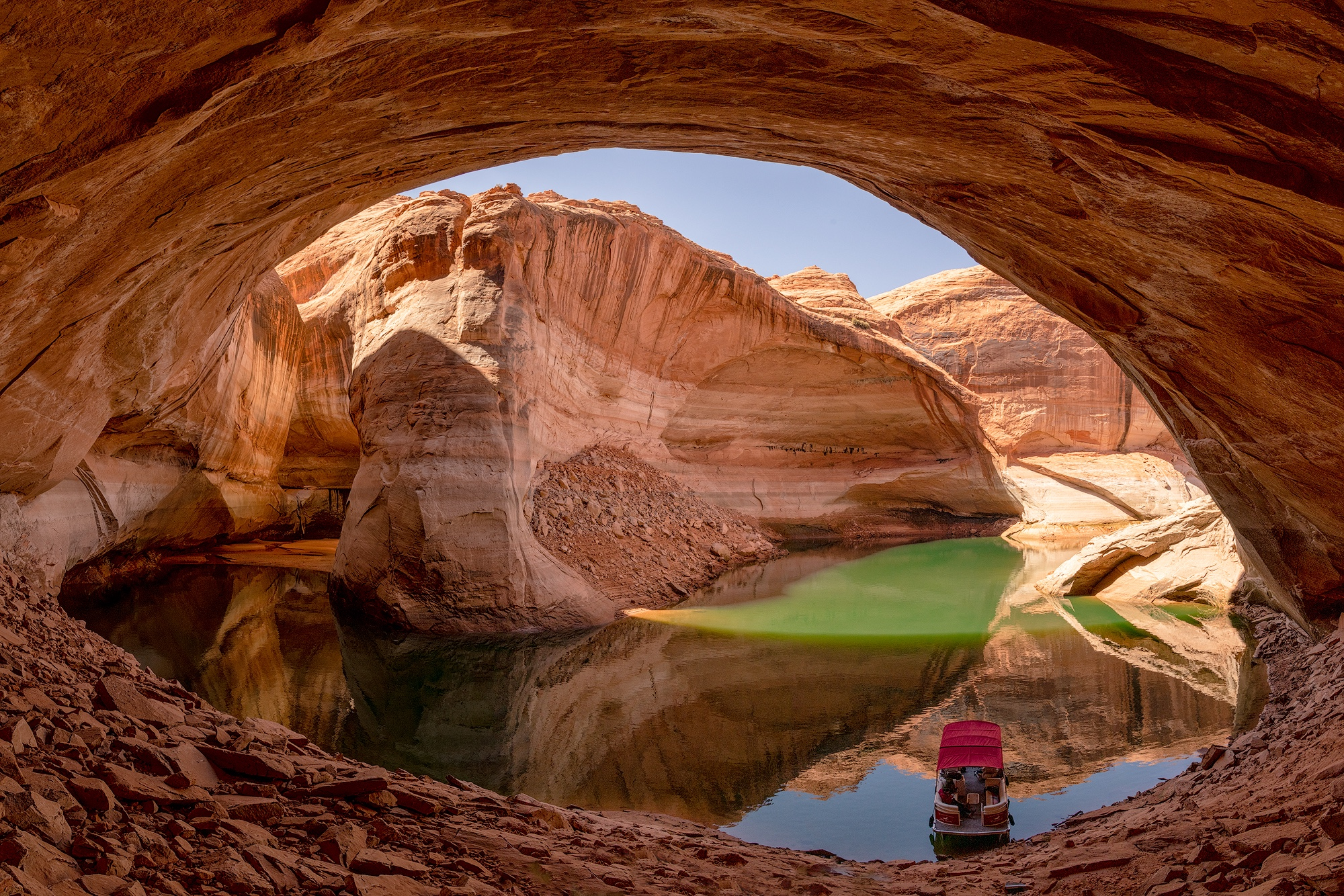
The Cathedral in the Desert in 2021 with a red boat

The Cathedral in the Desert is a natural formation, sometimes referred to as an amphitheater, buried under Lake Powell in Glen Canyon. Due to the Southwestern North American megadrought, the cathedral has been visible in 2005 and 2019. Lake Powell must drop to 3,605 feet for the cathedral floor to be visible.

The Cathedral is located at the head of Clear Water Canyon off the Escalante. Most are familiar with the feature from a Phil Hyde photo in 1964 taken just before Lake Powell began to fill, and many are seeing it for the first time now.

OARS, the first National Park Service-authorized rafting outfitter that travels the Colorado River through the Grand Canyon has a dory named in the cathedral's honor.
