= Lake Powell =

Reservoir in Utah and Arizona, United States

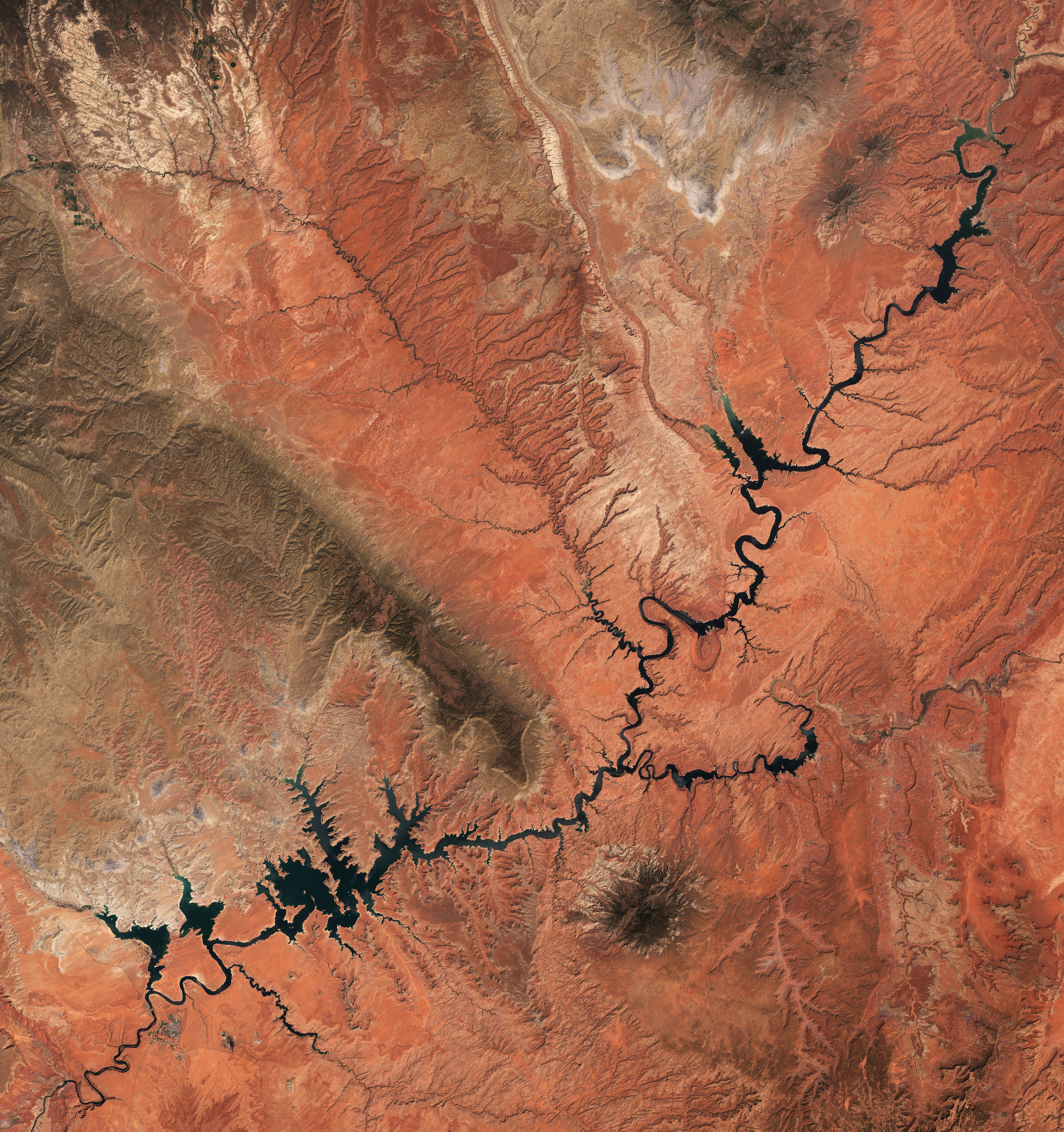

- Location within Arizona Location within Utah Location within the United States
- Location: Utah and Arizona, United States
- Coordinates: 36°56′10″N 111°29′03″W (Glen Canyon Dam)
- Type: Reservoir
- Primary inflows: Colorado River; Escalante River; San Juan River; Green River (Colorado River tributary)
- Primary outflows: Colorado River
- Catchment area: 280,586 km^{2} (108,335 sq mi)
- Basin countries: United States
- Managing agency: National Park Service
- Built: September 13, 1963
- Max. length: 186 mi (299 km)
- Max. width: 25 mi (40 km) (maximum)
- Surface area: 161,390 acres (65,310 ha)
- Average depth: 132 ft (40 m)
- Max. depth: 583 ft (178 m)
- Water volume: Full: 24,322,000 acre⋅ft (30.001 km^{3}); Current (June 3, 2026): 5,716,800 acre⋅ft (7.0516 km^{3})
- Residence time: 7.2 years
- Shore length^{1}: 3,057 km (1,900 mi)
- Surface elevation: Full: 3,700 ft (1,128 m); Low (September 15, 2026): 3,516.62 ft (1,072 m)
- Website: www.nps.gov/glca/index.htm
- ^{1} Shore length is not a well-defined measure.

Lake Powell is a reservoir on the Colorado River in Utah and Arizona, United States. It is a major vacation destination visited by approximately two million people every year. It holds 24,322,000 acre-feet (3.0001×10^{10} m^{3}) of water when full, second in the United States to only the downstream reservoir of Lake Mead – though Lake Mead has fallen below Lake Powell in size several times during the 21st century in terms of volume of water, depth, and surface area.

Lake Powell was created by the flooding of Glen Canyon by the Glen Canyon Dam, which also led to the 1972 creation of Glen Canyon National Recreation Area, a popular summer destination of public land managed by the National Park Service. The reservoir is named for John Wesley Powell. This Civil War veteran explored the river via three wooden boats in 1869. It lies primarily in southern Utah, with a small portion in northern Arizona.

Lake Powell is a water storage facility for the Upper Basin states of the Colorado River Compact (Colorado, Utah, Wyoming and New Mexico). The Compact specifies that the Upper Basin states are to provide a minimum annual flow of 7,500,000 acre-feet (9.3 km^{3}) to the Lower Basin states (Arizona, Nevada, and California).

According to the U.S. Geological Survey and the Bureau of Reclamation report, in addition to water loss, Lake Powell faced an average annual loss in storage capacity of about 33,270 acre-feet, or 11 billion gallons, per year between 1963 and 2018 because of sediments flowing in from the Colorado and San Juan rivers. Those settle at the bottom of the reservoir and decrease the total amount of water the reservoir can hold. Environmentalists have pushed to drain Lake Powell and restore Glen Canyon to its natural, free-flowing state.

== History ==
=== Planning ===
In the 1940s and early 1950s, the United States Bureau of Reclamation planned to construct a series of Colorado River dams in the rugged Colorado Plateau province of Colorado, Utah, and Arizona. Glen Canyon Dam was born of a controversial dam site the Bureau selected in Echo Park, in what became Dinosaur National Monument in Colorado. A small but politically effective group of objectors, led by David Brower of the Sierra Club, succeeded in defeating the Bureau's bid, citing Echo Park's natural and scenic qualities as too valuable to submerge.

Glen Canyon Dam was built to solve the downstream delivery obligations of the Upper Basin states. Lake Powell is an "aquatic bank" built to fulfill the terms of the "Compact Calls" of the Lower Basin.

=== Construction ===
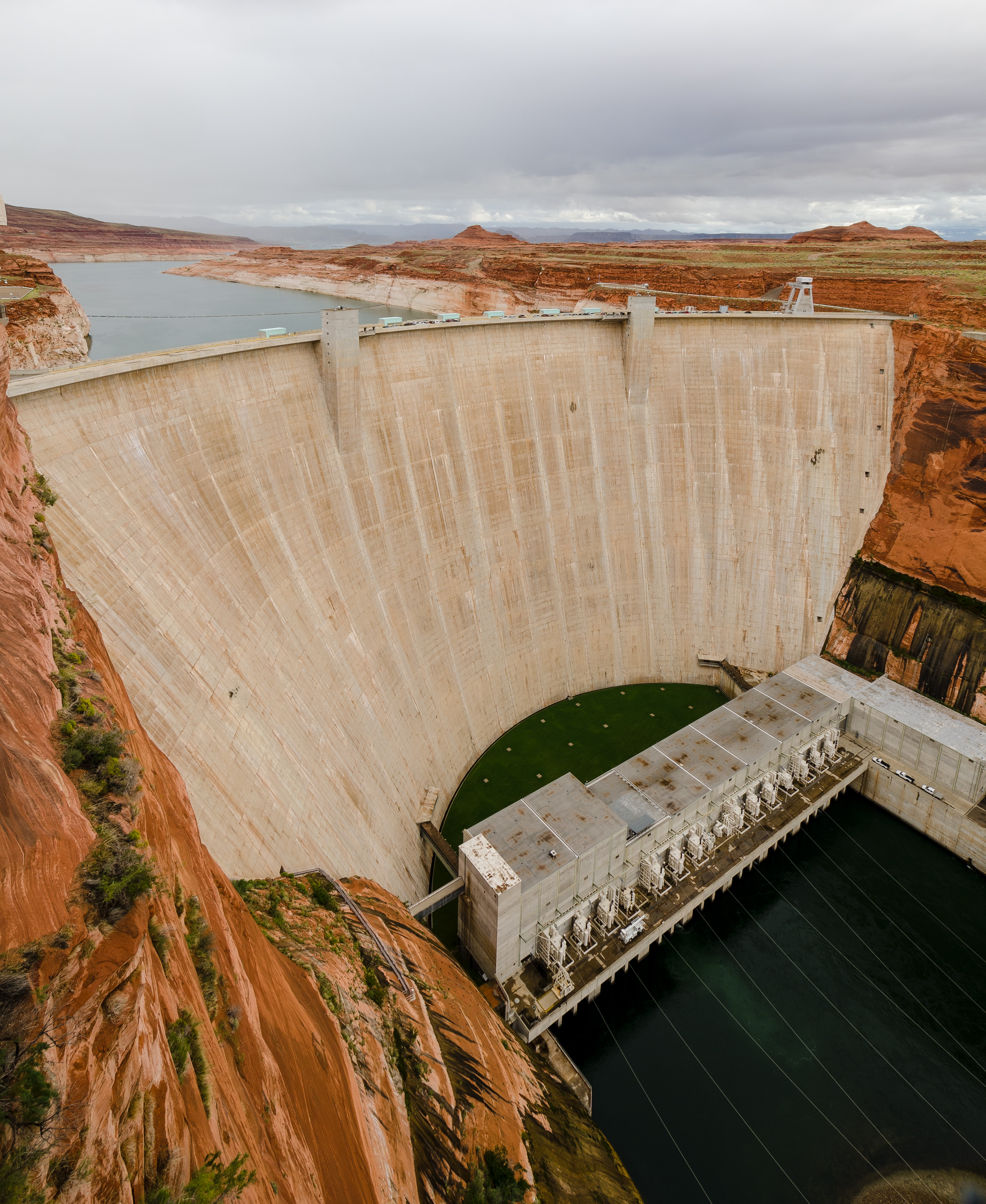
Glen Canyon Dam in Page, Arizona

Construction on Glen Canyon Dam began with a demolition blast keyed by the push of a button by President Dwight D. Eisenhower at his desk in the Oval Office on October 1, 1956, which started clearing tunnels for water diversion. On February 11, 1959, water flowed through the tunnels so dam construction could begin. Later that year, the bridge was completed, allowing trucks to deliver equipment and materials for the dam and also for the new town of Page, Arizona.

Concrete placement started around the clock on June 17, 1960. The last bucket of over 5 million cubic yards (4,000,000 m^{3}) was poured on September 13, 1963. The dam is 710 feet (216 m) high, and the surface elevation of the water at full pool is approximately 3700 feet (1100 m). The construction cost was $155 million, and 18 lives were lost. On September 22, 1966, Glen Canyon Dam was dedicated by Lady Bird Johnson. From 1970 to 1980, turbines and generators were installed for hydroelectricity.

=== Filling and operations ===
Upon completion of Glen Canyon Dam on September 13, 1963, the Colorado River began to back up, no longer being diverted through the tunnels. The newly flooded Glen Canyon formed Lake Powell. Sixteen years elapsed before the lake filled to the 3,700 feet (1,100 m) level on June 22, 1980. The lake level fluctuates considerably depending on the seasonal snow runoff from the Rocky Mountains. The all-time highest water level was reached on July 14, 1983, during one of the heaviest Colorado River floods in recorded history, in part influenced by a strong El Niño event. The lake rose to 3,708.34 feet (1,130.30 m) above sea level, with a water content of 25,757,086 acre-feet (31.770898 km^{3}). It lies primarily in parts of Garfield, Kane, and San Juan counties in southern Utah, with a small portion in Coconino County in northern Arizona. The northern limits of the lake extend at least as far as the Hite Crossing Bridge.

=== 21st-century drought and push to drain ===
In the 21st century, the water level of Lake Powell has declined from near maximum capacity to within 30 feet (9.1 m) of the minimum level needed for Glen Canyon Dam to generate electricity.

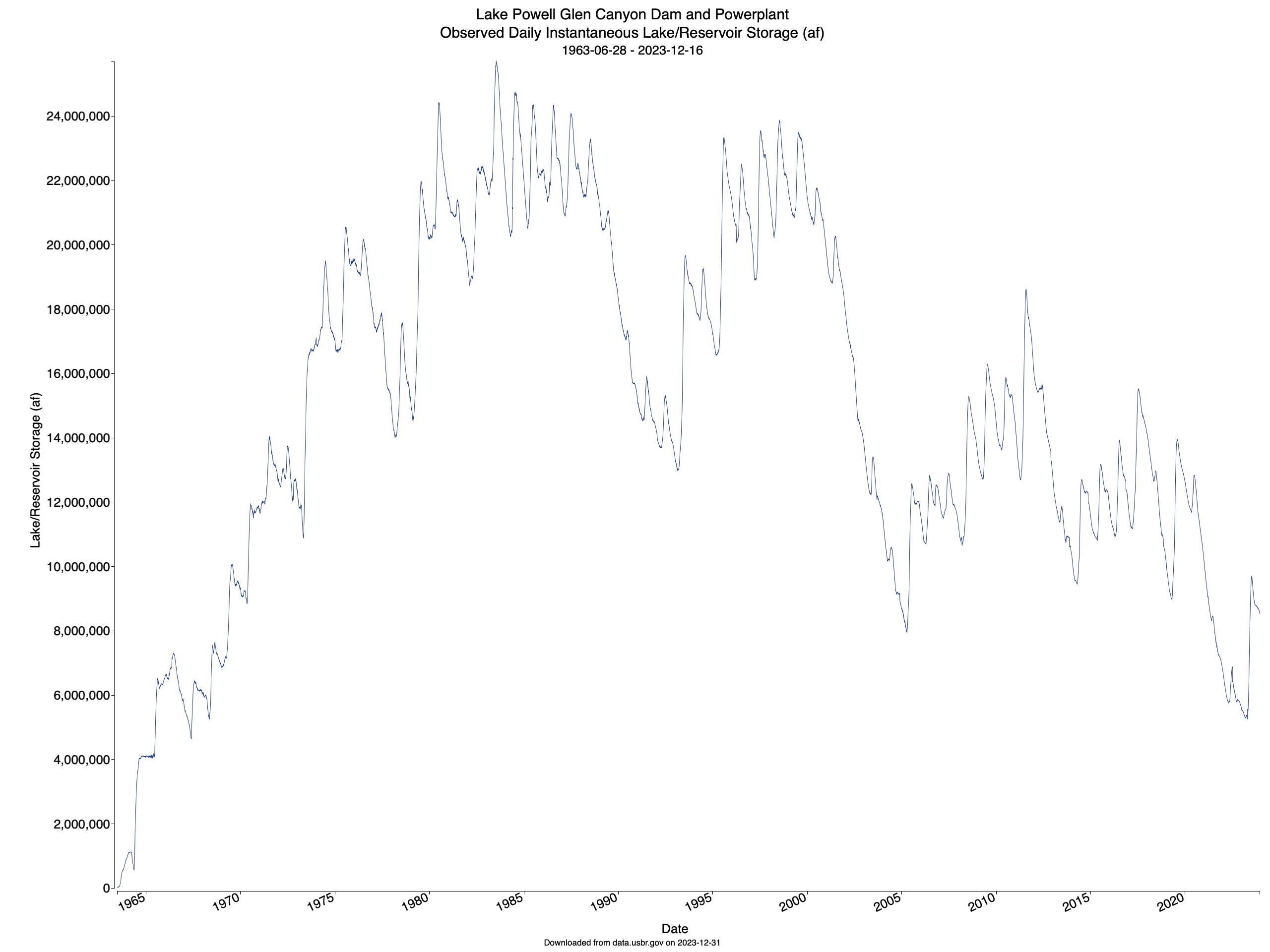
Chart showing daily water volume observations for Lake Powell, from Jun 28, 1963 to December 16, 2023

Lake Powell surface area shrinkage

Colorado River flows have been below average since 2000 as a result of the southwestern North American megadrought, leading to lower lake levels. In winter 2005 (before the spring runoff), the lake reached its then-lowest level since filling, an elevation of 3,555.10 feet (1,083.59 m) above sea level, which was approximately 150 feet (46 m) below full pool. After 2005, the lake level slowly rebounded, although it has not filled since then. Summer 2011 saw the third-largest June and the second-largest July runoff since the closure of Glen Canyon Dam, and the water level peaked at nearly 3,661 feet (1,116 m), 77 percent of capacity, on July 30. However, water years 2012 and 2013 were, respectively, the third and fourth-lowest runoff years recorded on the Colorado River. By April 9, 2014, the lake level had fallen to 3,574.31 feet (1,089.45 m), largely erasing the gains made in 2011.

Colorado River levels returned to normal during water years 2014 and 2015 (pushing the lake to 3,606 feet (1,099 m)) by the end of water year 2015. The Bureau of Reclamation in 2014 reduced the Lake Powell release from 8.23 to 7.48 million acre-feet, for the first time since the lake filled in 1980. This was done due to the "equalization" guideline, which stipulates that an approximately equal amount of water must be retained in both Lake Powell and Lake Mead in order to preserve hydropower generation capacity at both lakes. This resulted in Lake Mead declining to the lowest level on record since the 1930s.

Long-term water level decline continued, forcing an emergency release of water from the Flaming Gorge Reservoir in July 2021. By April 22, 2022, Lake Powell was at 3,522.24 feet (1,073.58 m) in elevation – just 22.88% of capacity. This marked the lowest water level for Lake Powell since it was filled in 1963. This level was again reached at the end of July 2026, then going down to 3,516.62 feet (1,071.87 m) six weeks later.

The capacity of Lake Powell has decreased by 7% since 1963, facing an average annual loss of 33,270 acre-feet of storage, due to the inflow of sediments from Colorado and San Juan rivers.

Peer-reviewed studies indicate that storing water in Lake Mead rather than in Lake Powell would yield a savings of 300,000 acre-feet of water or more per year, leading to calls by environmentalists to drain Lake Powell and restore Glen Canyon to its natural, free-flowing state.

== Climate ==
These data are for the Wahweap climate station on Lake Powell just south of the Utah-Arizona border (Years 1961 to 2012).

Climate data for Wahweap, AZ
Month	Jan	Feb	Mar	Apr	May	Jun	Jul	Aug	Sep	Oct	Nov	Dec	Year
Record high °F (°C)	69 (21)	78 (26)	85 (29)	94 (34)	104 (40)	110 (43)	120 (49)	115 (46)	105 (41)	96 (36)	80 (27)	70 (21)	120 (49)
Mean daily maximum °F (°C)	47.2 (8.4)	53.8 (12.1)	63.0 (17.2)	72.8 (22.7)	83.8 (28.8)	94.1 (34.5)	98.8 (37.1)	95.7 (35.4)	87.7 (30.9)	73.7 (23.2)	58.3 (14.6)	47.1 (8.4)	73.0 (22.8)
Mean daily minimum °F (°C)	26.9 (−2.8)	31.8 (−0.1)	37.8 (3.2)	44.6 (7.0)	54.9 (12.7)	64.1 (17.8)	71.3 (21.8)	69.3 (20.7)	60.7 (15.9)	48.9 (9.4)	36.9 (2.7)	27.4 (−2.6)	47.9 (8.8)
Record low °F (°C)	−2 (−19)	4 (−16)	21 (−6)	16 (−9)	29 (−2)	40 (4)	48 (9)	51 (11)	36 (2)	24 (−4)	15 (−9)	3 (−16)	−2 (−19)
Average precipitation inches (mm)	0.59 (15)	0.56 (14)	0.63 (16)	0.37 (9.4)	0.36 (9.1)	0.17 (4.3)	0.51 (13)	0.75 (19)	0.59 (15)	0.85 (22)	0.57 (14)	0.41 (10)	6.36 (160.8)
Average snowfall inches (cm)	0.2 (0.51)	0.2 (0.51)	0 (0)	0 (0)	0 (0)	0 (0)	0 (0)	0 (0)	0 (0)	0 (0)	0 (0)	0.3 (0.76)	0.7 (1.78)
Source: http://www.wrcc.dri.edu/cgi-bin/cliMAIN.pl?az9114

== Geology ==
Glen Canyon was carved by differential erosion from the Colorado River over an estimated 5 million years. The Colorado Plateau, through which the canyon cuts, arose some 11 million years ago. Within that plateau lie layers of rock from over 300 million years ago to the relatively recent volcanic activity. Pennsylvanian and Permian formations can be seen in Cataract Canyon and San Juan Canyon. The Moenkopi Formation, which dates from 230 million years ago (Triassic Period), and the Chinle Formation are found at Lees Ferry and the Rincon. Both formations are the result of the ancient inland sea that covered the area. Once the sea drained, windblown sand invaded the area, creating what is known as Wingate Sandstone.

The more recent (Jurassic Period) formations include Kayenta Sandstone, which produces the trademark blue-black "desert varnish" that streaks down many walls of the canyons. Above this is Navajo Sandstone. Many of the arches, including Rainbow Bridge, lie at this transition point. This period also includes light yellow Entrada Sandstone and the dark brown, almost purple Carmel Formation. These latter two can be seen on the tops of mesas around Wahweap, and the crown of Castle Rock and Tower Butte. Above these layers lie the sandstone, conglomerate and shale of the Straight Cliffs Formation that underlies the Kaiparowits Plateau and San Rafael Swell to the north of the lake.

The confluences of the Escalante, Dirty Devil, and San Juan rivers with the Colorado lie within Lake Powell. The slower flow of the San Juan River has produced goosenecks where 5 miles (8.0 km) of river are contained within 1-mile (1.6 km) a straight line.

== Landmarks and features ==
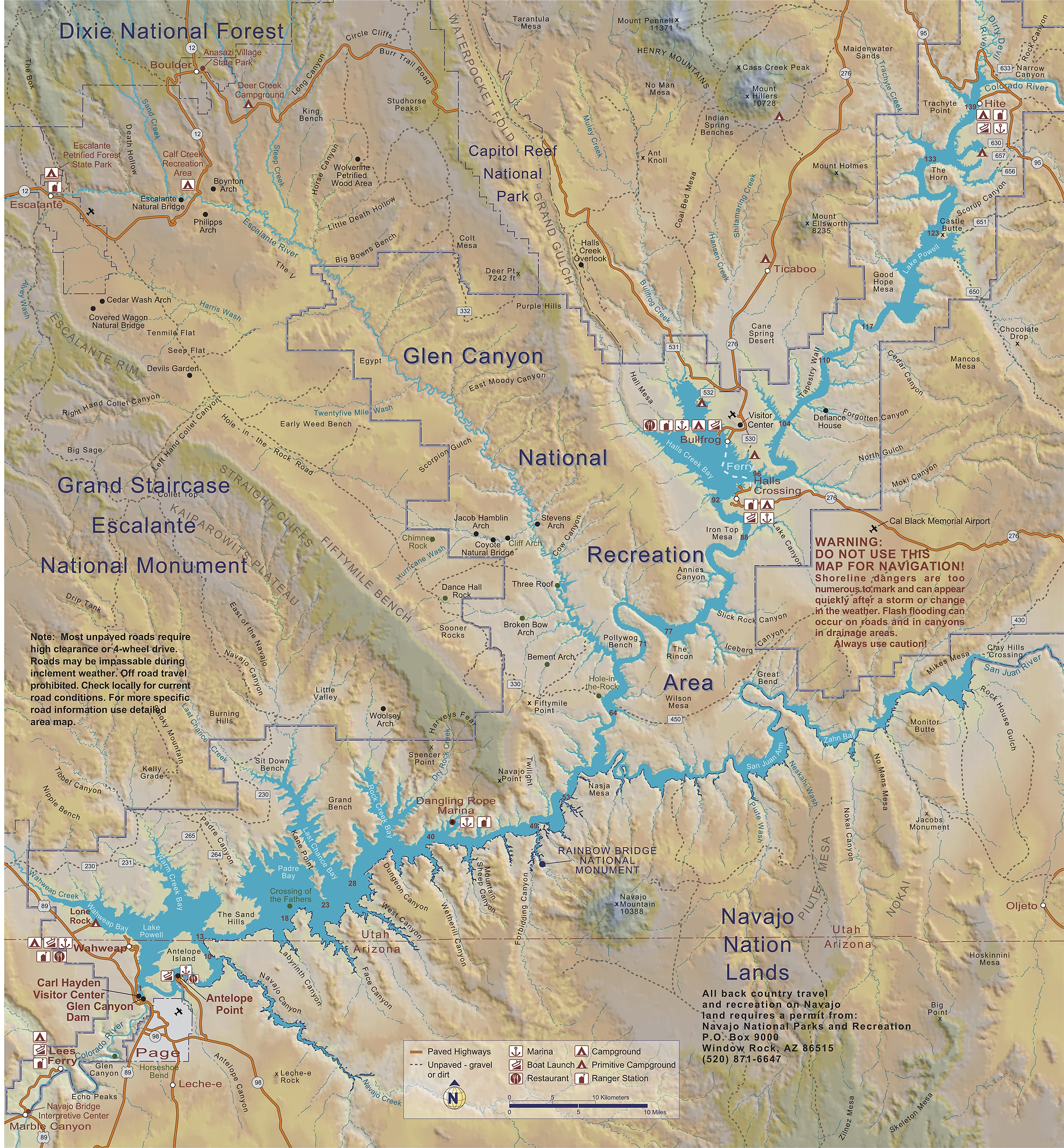
Area features, click to enlarge

The lake's main body stretches up Glen Canyon, but has also filled many (over 90) side canyons. The lake also stretches up the Escalante River and San Juan River where they merge into the main Colorado River. This provides access to many natural geographic points of interest as well as some remnants of the Anasazi culture.

- Glen Canyon Dam, the dam blocks the Colorado River and forms Lake Powell. (Arizona)
- Rainbow Bridge, one of the world's largest natural bridges. (Utah)
- Hite Crossing Bridge, the only bridge spanning Lake Powell. Although the bridge informally marks the upstream limit of the lake, when the lake is at its normal high-water elevation, backwater can stretch up to 30 miles (48 km) upstream into Cataract Canyon.
- Defiance House ruin (Anasazi)
- Castle Rock
- Cathedral in the Desert
- San Juan goosenecks
- Gregory Butte
- Gunsight Butte
- Lone Rock
- Alstrom Point
- Kaiparowits Plateau
- Hole-in-the-Rock crossing
- The Rincon
- Three-Roof Ruin
- Padre Bay
- Waterpocket Fold
- Antelope Island lies mostly in Arizona just north of Page in the southwest part of Lake Powell.

== Images ==
Lake Powell

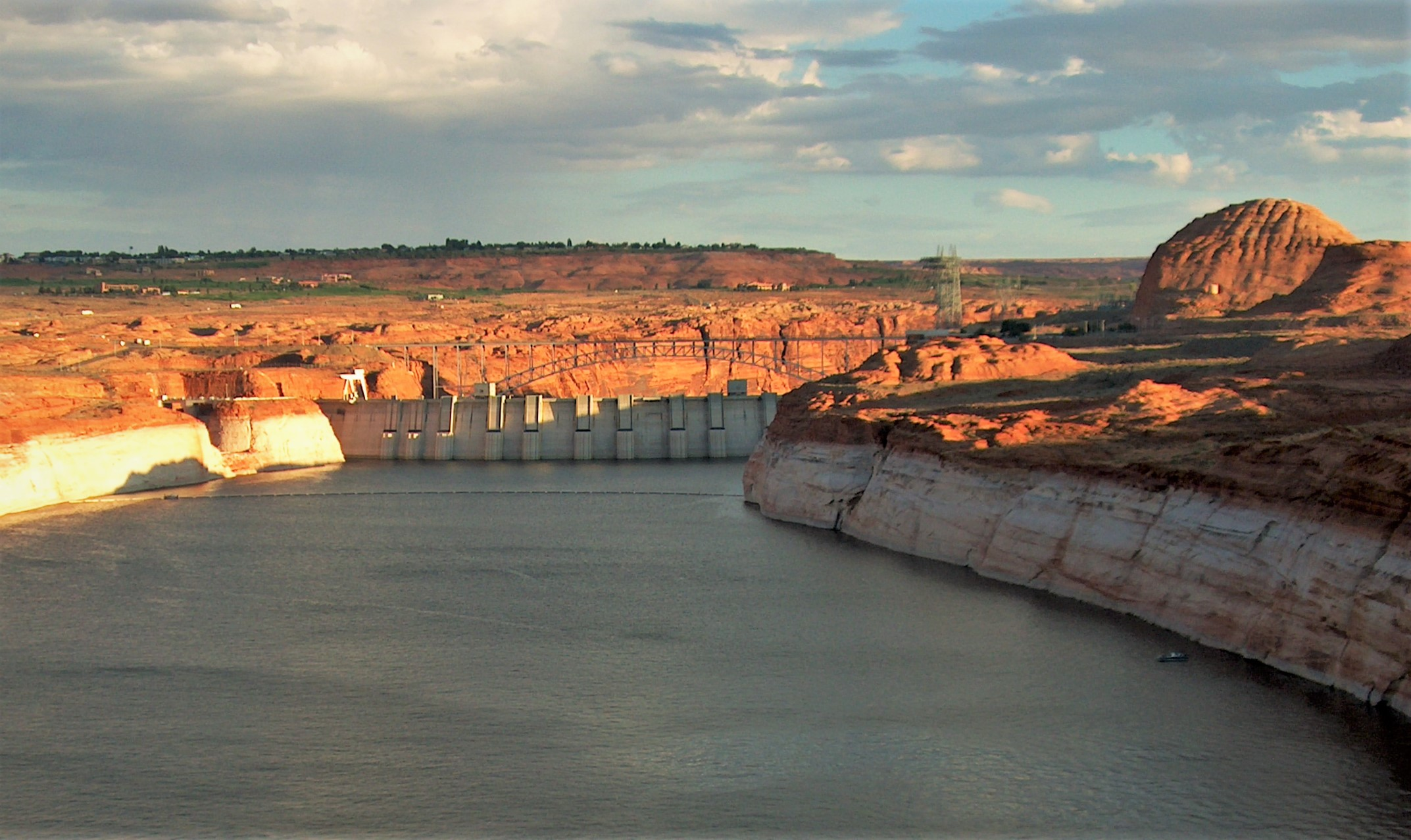
Glen Canyon Dam and Colorado River bridge

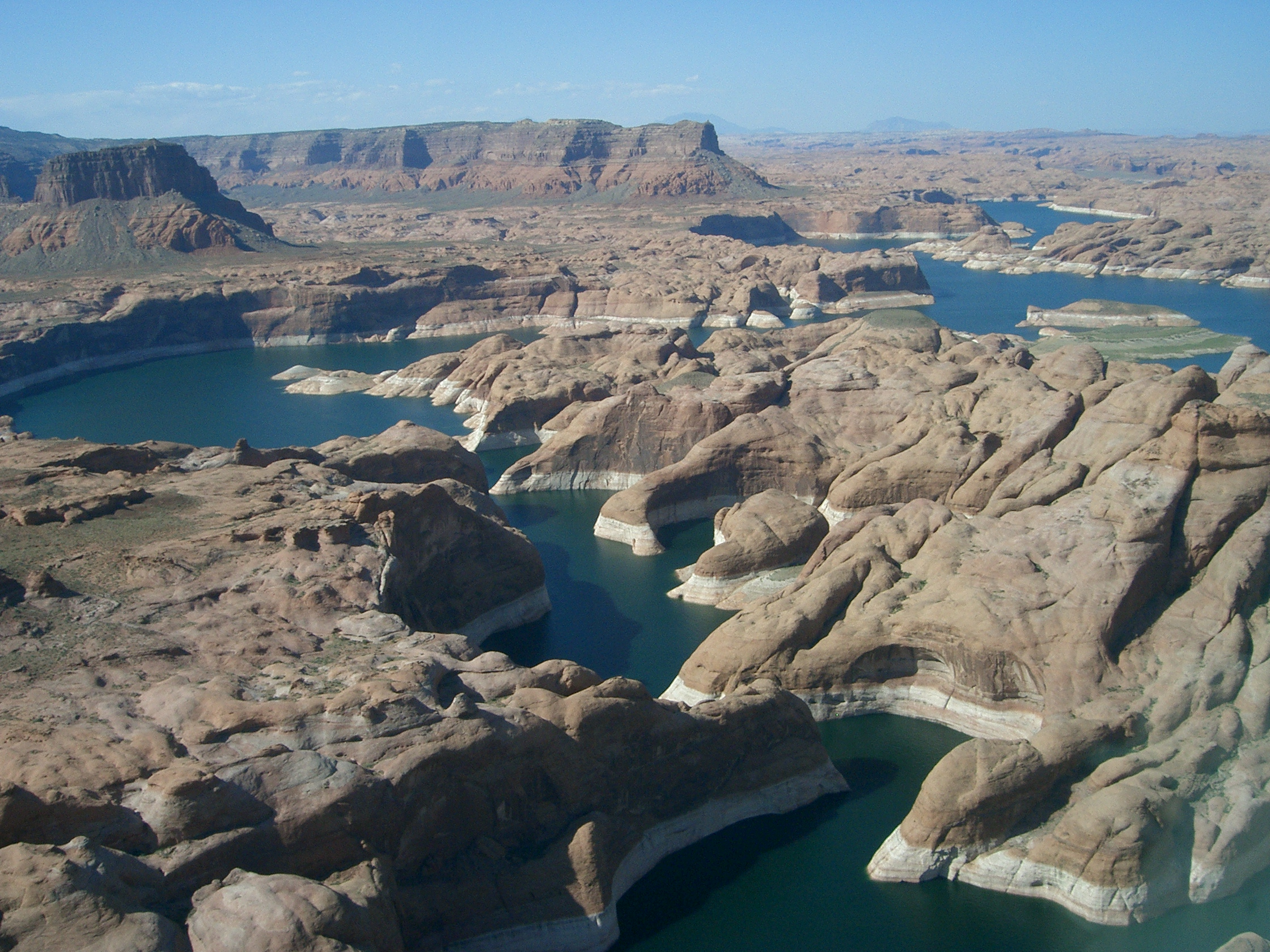
Lake Powell in 2007

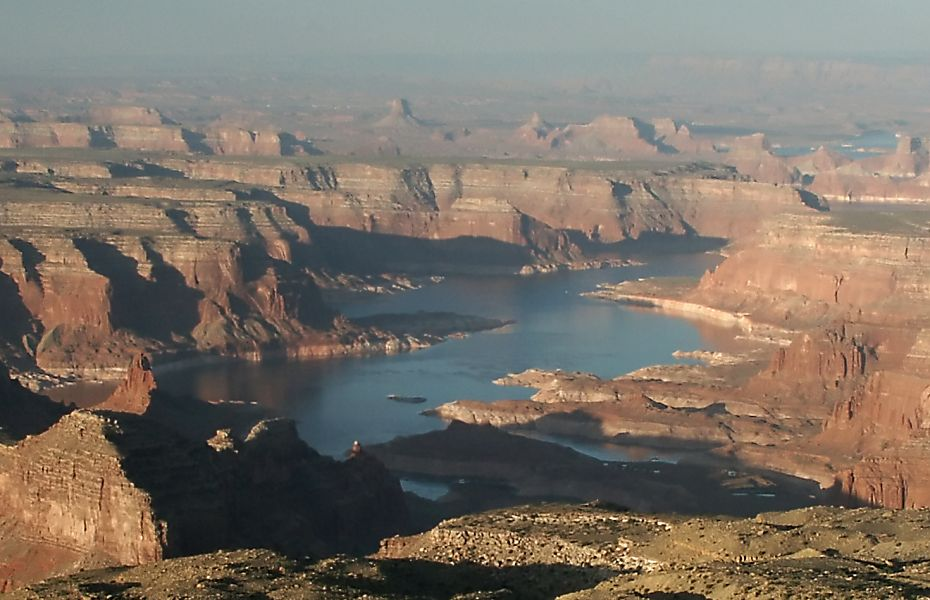
Lake Powell, looking southwest at sunrise

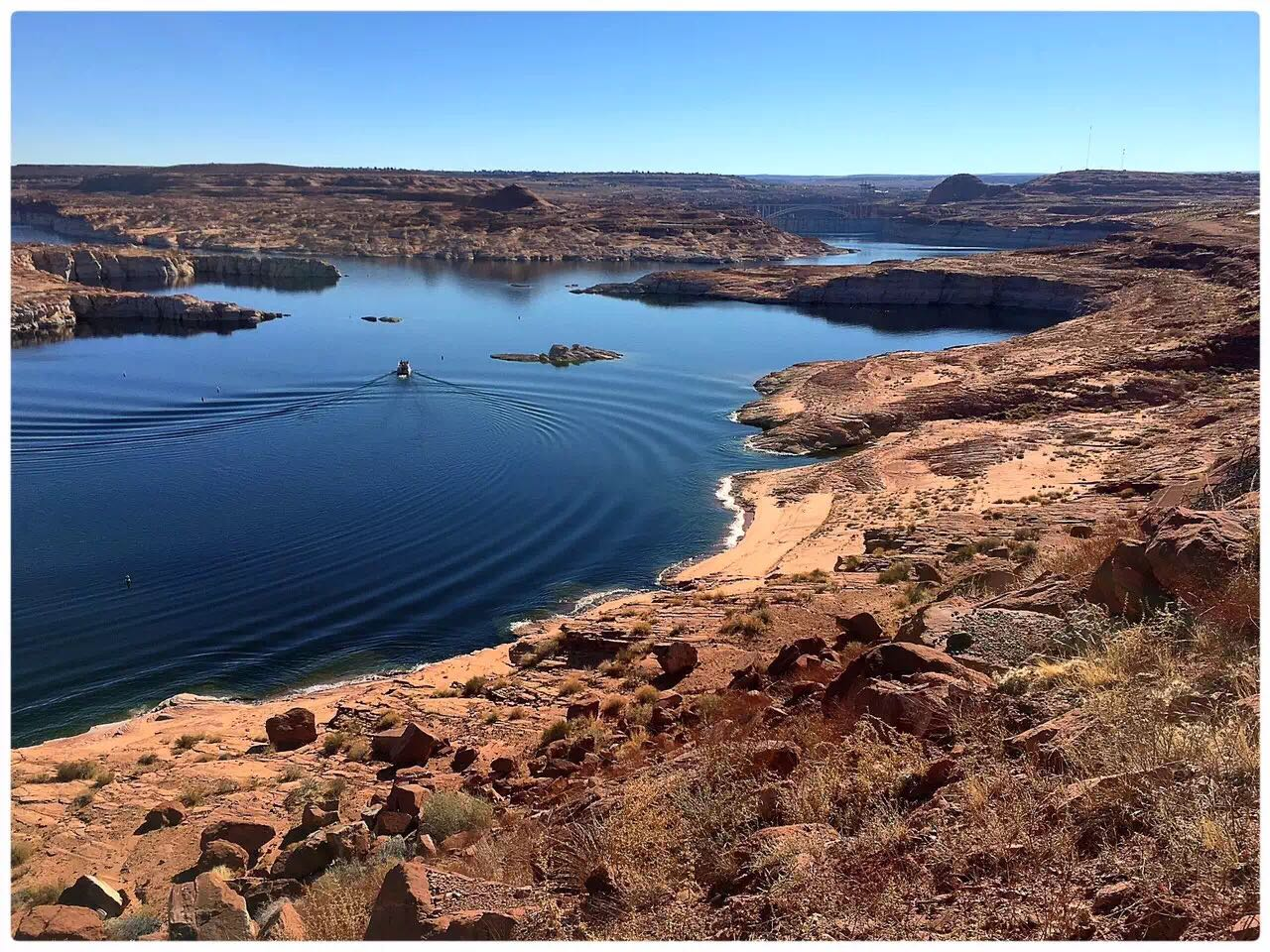
Lake Powell in Arizona. The dam is under the arch bridge (upper right end of the water)

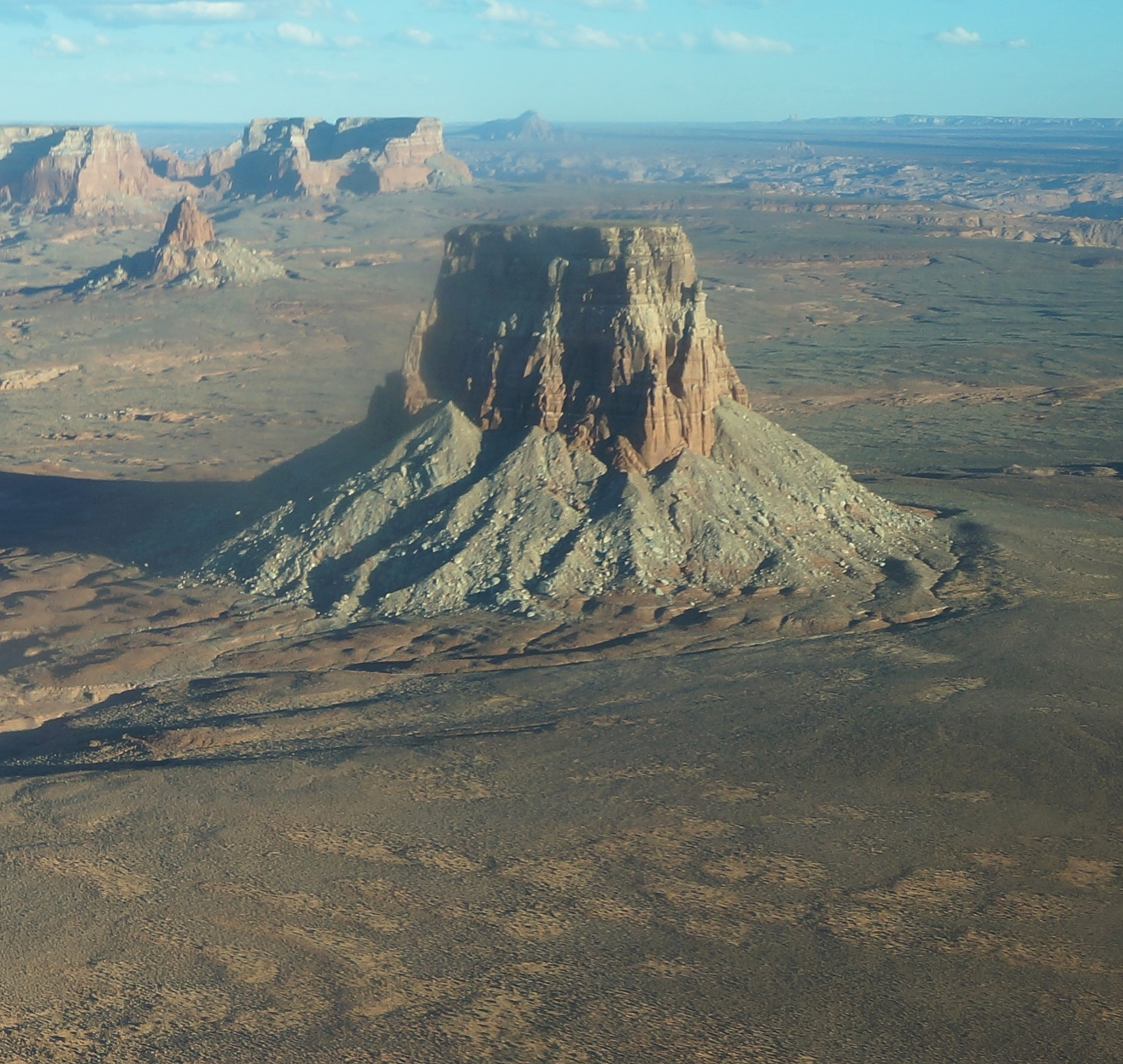
Aerial view of Tower Butte Arizona

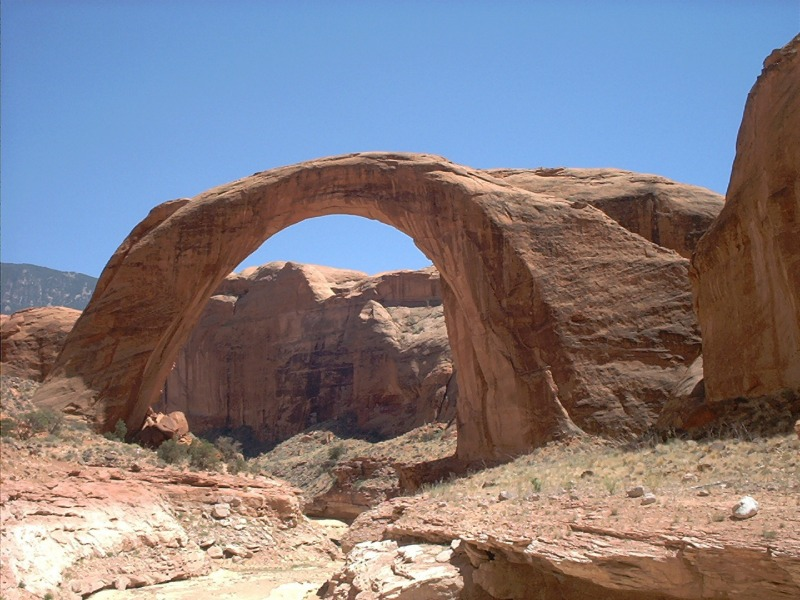
Rainbow Bridge National Monument

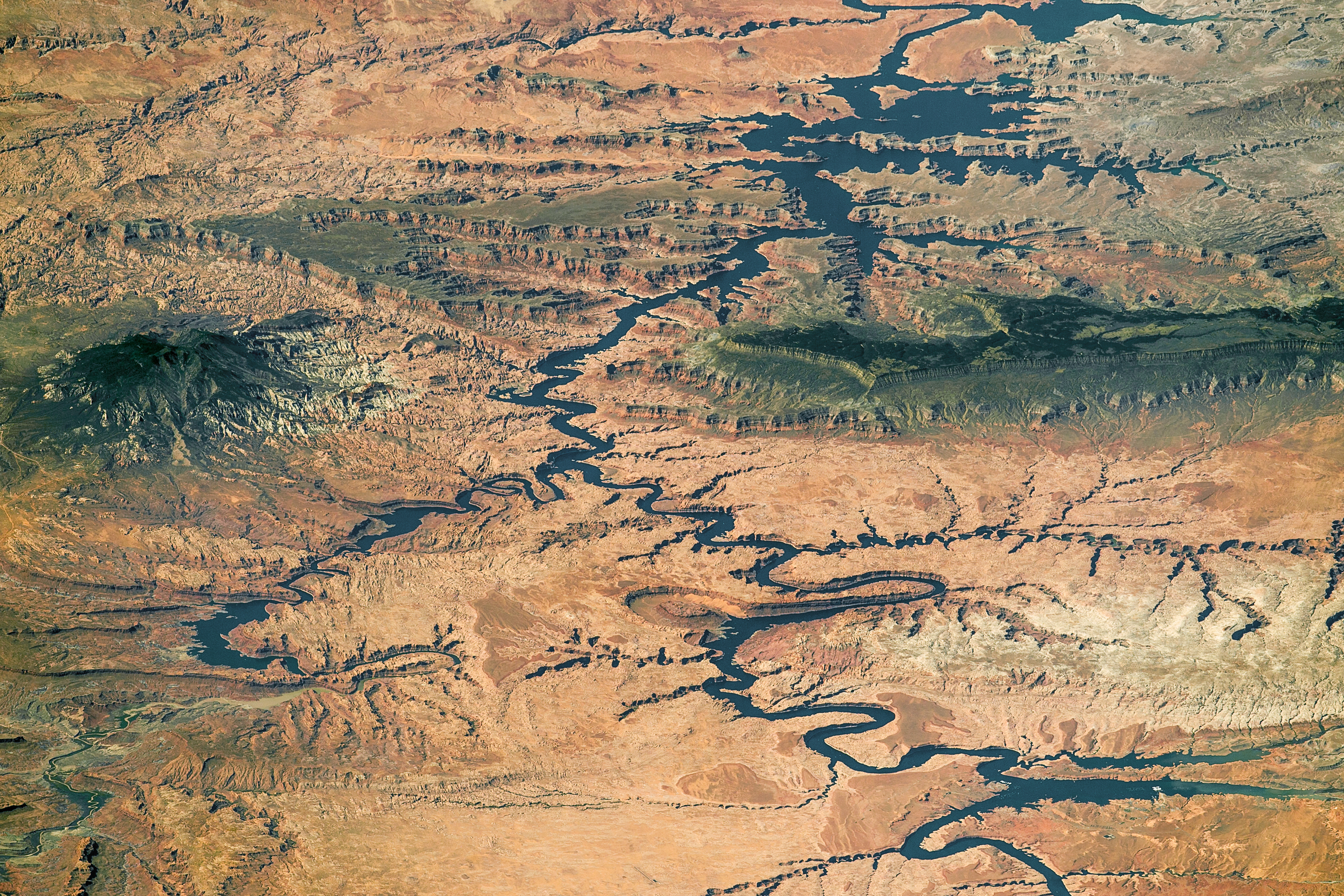
Lake Powell and Grand Staircase–Escalante from space, 2016

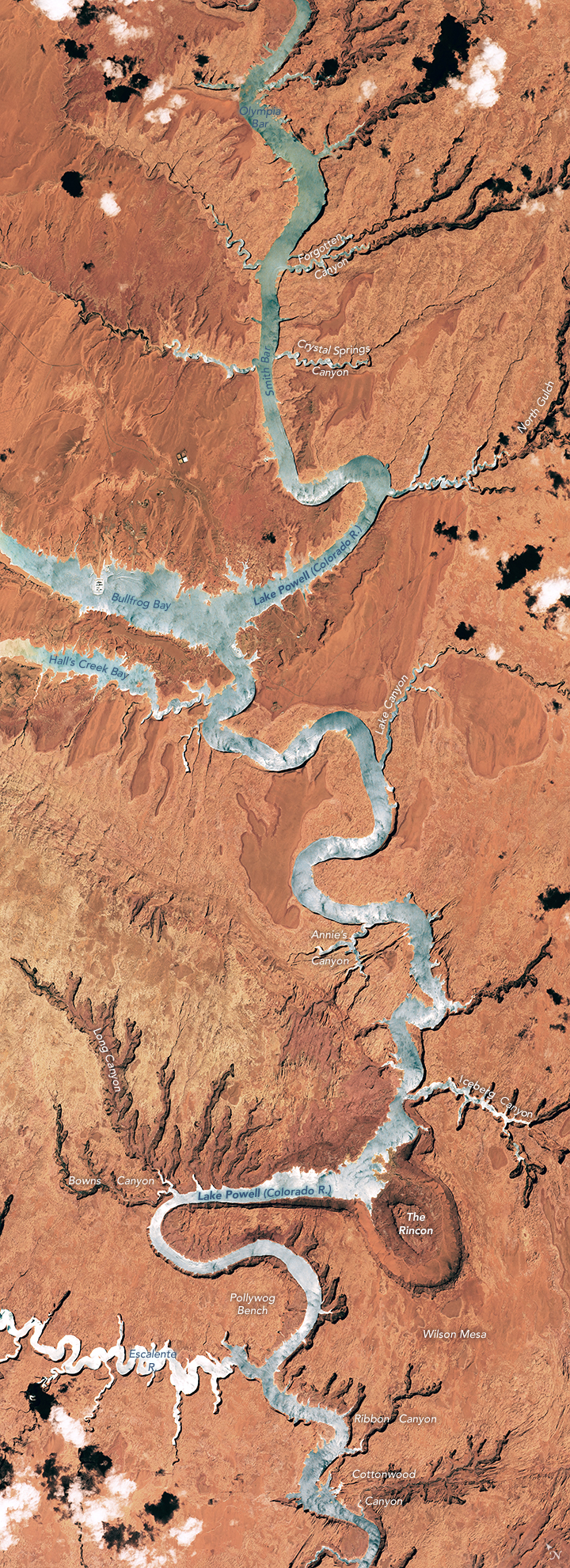
Lake Powell from space, 2016

== Development ==
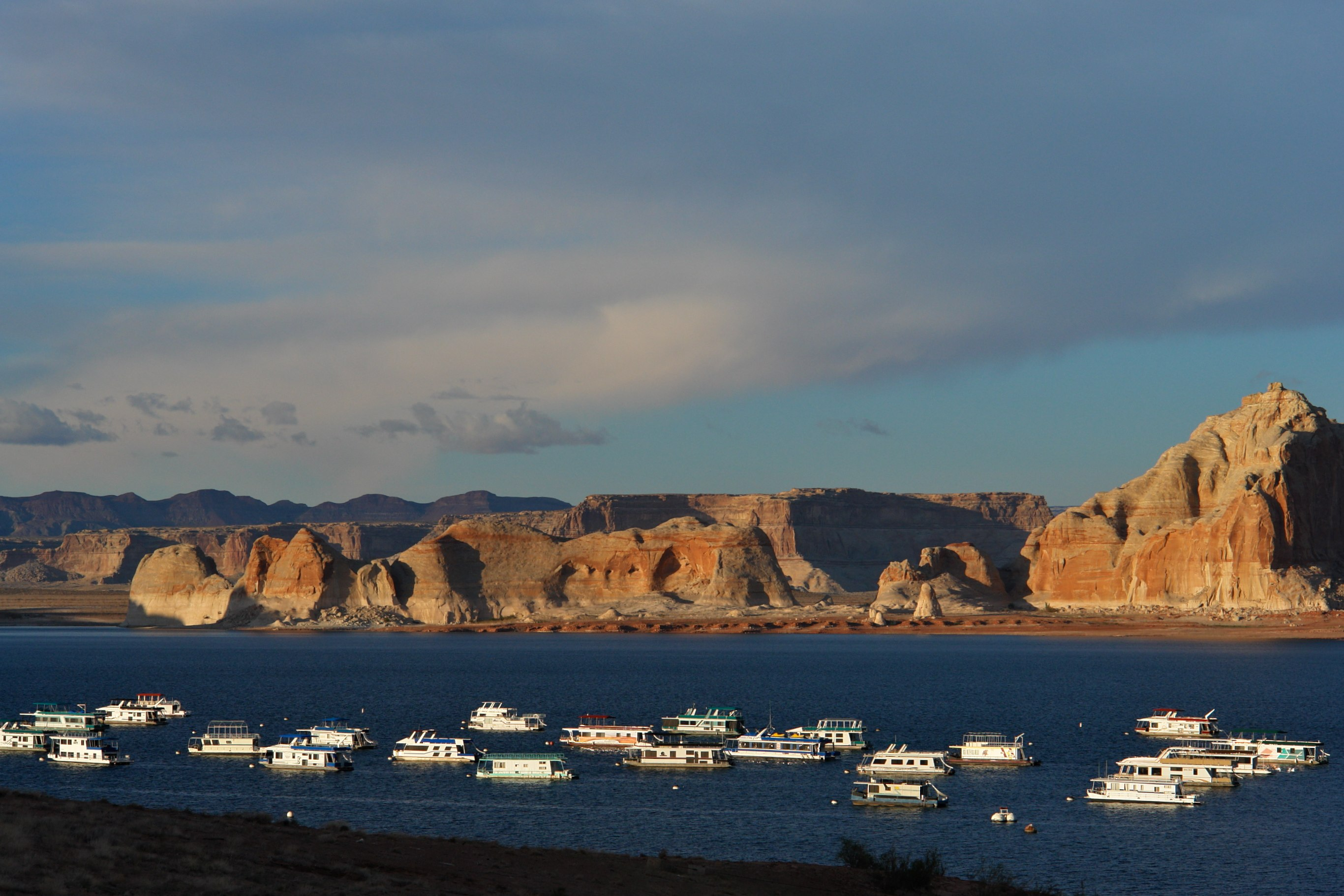
Recreational boating and waterskiing spot in Lake Powell, near Page, Arizona. (Castle Rock far right)

Access to the lake is limited to developed marinas because most of the lake is surrounded by steep sandstone walls:

- Lee's Ferry
- Page and Wahweap Marina
- Antelope Point Marina
- Halls Crossing, Utah Marina
- Bullfrog Marina
- Hite Marina

The following marinas are accessible only by boat:

- Dangling Rope Marina
- Rainbow Bridge National Monument
- Escalante Subdistrict

Glen Canyon National Recreation Area draws more than two million visitors annually. Recreational activities include boating, fishing, waterskiing, jet-skiing, and hiking. Prepared campgrounds can be found at each marina. Still, many visitors choose to rent a houseboat or bring their own camping equipment, find a secluded spot somewhere in the canyons, and make their own camp (there are no restrictions on where visitors can stay).

The Castle Rock Cut is one of the most important navigational channels in the lake; it was blasted as early as the 1970s to allow boaters to bypass the winding canyons between the Glen Canyon Dam and reaches of Lake Powell further upstream – saving, on average, one hour of travel time. The cut has been deepened several times since then, to allow the use of the channel during droughts. During the protracted 21st-century drought however, the lake has dropped so quickly on several occasions that the cut dried up, most recently being accessible in 2024. Continued deepening of the Castle Rock cut has been criticized for its high cost, but boaters and the National Park Service argue that it improves safety, saves millions of dollars in fuel, and improves emergency response time.

Currently, most marinas on the lake don't have Automatic Identification System monitoring stations that transmit boat positions to the AIS websites for the boating community. A substantial number of vessels on the lake do not have AIS transponders, as there currently are no mandatory requirements for AIS usage for this body of water. Extra precautions must be taken with respect to boating safety, as the fractal nature of the lake's hydrologic surface area can allow vessels with limited charting equipment to become easily lost.

The burying of human (and pet) waste in Glen Canyon National Recreation Area is prohibited. Anyone who camps farther than a quarter of a mile from a marina must bring a portable toilet. Pet waste must also be packed out.

The southwestern end of Lake Powell in Arizona can be accessed via U.S. Route 89 and State Route 98. State Route 95 and State Route 276 lead to the northeastern end of the lake in Utah.

== Fishing at Lake Powell ==
Fishing is one of the most common activities at Lake Powell. Some of the fishing hotspots include Bullfrog Basin, Padre Bay, Wahweap Bay, The San Juan Arm, and Halls Creek Bay.

== Fish Species ==
Some of these fish species are on the US Endangered Species List. Currently, most native species in the Colorado River Basin are subject to ongoing restoration efforts of some kind.

Bass

- Smallmouth bass
- Largemouth bass
- Striped bass

Carp, pike and others

- Crappie
- Sunfish
- Channel catfish
- Northern pike
- Walleye
- Common carp
- Razorback sucker
- Brown trout
- Bonytail chub
- Gizzard shad

== Invasive species ==
Zebra and quagga mussels first appeared in the United States in the 1980s.

The mussels were initially brought to the United States through the ballast water of ships entering the Great Lakes. These aquatic invaders soon spread to many bodies of water in the Eastern United States and have even made their way to the western United States. In January 2008, Zebra mussels have been detected in several reservoirs along the Colorado River system such as Lakes Mead, Mojave, and Havasu.

By the early 2000s, Arizona, California, Nebraska, Kansas, Colorado, Nevada, and Utah have all confirmed the presence of larval zebra mussels in lakes and reservoirs.

Zebra and quagga mussels can be destructive to an ecosystem due to competition for resources with native species. The filtration of zooplankton by the mussels can negatively impact feeding for some species of fish. Zebra and quagga mussels can attach to hard surfaces and build layers on underwater structures. The mussels are known to clog pipes, including those in hydroelectric power systems, thus becoming a costly and time-consuming problem for water managers in the West.

Control policies have recently been introduced to alleviate the hydroelectric problems as well as ecological problems faced by Western infestations. Beginning in 1999, Lake Powell began to visually monitor for the mussels.

In 2001, hot water boat decontamination sites were established at Wahweap, Bullfrog, and Halls Crossing marinas. In January 2007, zebra mussels were detected in Lake Mead, and new action plans were announced to prevent the spread of mussels to Lake Powell. In August 2007, preliminary testing was positive for zebra or quagga larvae in Lake Powell. These tests were deemed false positives, but adult quagga mussels were found in 2013.

Lake Powell introduced a mandatory boat inspection for each watercraft entering the reservoir beginning in June 2009. Effective June 29, 2009, every vessel entering Lake Powell must have a mussel certificate, although boat owners were allowed to self-certify. These measures were intended to help prevent vessels from transporting Zebra mussels into Lake Powell.

Despite these measures, quagga mussel DNA was detected in 2012, and live mussels were found at a number of sites including the Wahweap Marina in Spring and Summer 2013. In June 2013, the NPS was attempting a diver-based eradication program to find and remove mussels before the lake became infested.

As of March 2023, quagga mussels have spread to all areas of the lake. Because of this, the focus has been shifted from preventing mussels from spreading within the lake to preventing mussels from spreading to other bodies of water.

== Pipeline proposal ==
The Washington County Water Conservancy District has proposed building the Lake Powell Pipeline, which would have the capacity to extract up to 83,756 acre-feet (103,312,000 m^{3}) per year from Lake Powell for distribution to municipal drinking water systems in the county.

== Bibliography ==
- Martin, Russell, A Story That Stands Like a Dam: Glen Canyon and the Struggle for the Soul of the West, Henry Holt & Co, 1989
- McPhee, John, "Encounters with the Archdruid," Farrar, Straus and Giroux, 1971
- Nichols, Tad, Glen Canyon: Images of a Lost World, Santa Fe: Museum of New Mexico Press, 2000
- Abbey, Edward, Desert Solitaire, Ballantine Books, 1985
- Glick, Daniel (April 2006). "A Dry Red Season: Uncovering the Glory of Glen Canyon,". National Geographic. Archived from the original on 2007-08-07.
- Farmer, Jared, Glen Canyon Dammed: Inventing Lake Powell and the Canyon Country, Tucson: The University of Arizona Press, 1999
- Stiles, Jim, The Brief but Wonderful Return of Cathedral in the Desert, Salt Lake Tribune, June 7, 2005
