= Wahweap, Arizona =

- Populated place
- Location within the state of Arizona Wahweap (the United States)
- Coordinates: 36°59′48″N 111°29′25″W
- Country: United States
- State: Arizona
- County: Coconino
- Elevation: 3,704 ft (1,129 m)
- Time zone: UTC-7 (Mountain (MST))
  - Summer (DST): UTC-7 (MST)
- Area code: 928
- FIPS code: 04-80500
- GNIS feature ID: 25256

Wahweap is a populated place situated in Coconino County, Arizona, United States, right along the border with Utah.

== Transportation ==
Express offers bus service between Wahweap and Page, Arizona.

== Climate ==
Wahweap is located near the south end of Lake Powell.

Climate data for Wahweap, AZ
Month	Jan	Feb	Mar	Apr	May	Jun	Jul	Aug	Sep	Oct	Nov	Dec	Year
Record high °F (°C)	69 (21)	78 (26)	85 (29)	94 (34)	104 (40)	110 (43)	120 (49)	115 (46)	105 (41)	96 (36)	80 (27)	70 (21)	120 (49)
Mean daily maximum °F (°C)	47.2 (8.4)	53.8 (12.1)	63.0 (17.2)	72.8 (22.7)	83.8 (28.8)	94.1 (34.5)	98.8 (37.1)	95.7 (35.4)	87.7 (30.9)	73.7 (23.2)	58.3 (14.6)	47.1 (8.4)	73.0 (22.8)
Mean daily minimum °F (°C)	26.9 (−2.8)	31.8 (−0.1)	37.8 (3.2)	44.6 (7.0)	54.9 (12.7)	64.1 (17.8)	71.3 (21.8)	69.3 (20.7)	60.7 (15.9)	48.9 (9.4)	36.9 (2.7)	27.4 (−2.6)	47.9 (8.8)
Record low °F (°C)	−2 (−19)	4 (−16)	21 (−6)	16 (−9)	29 (−2)	40 (4)	48 (9)	51 (11)	36 (2)	24 (−4)	15 (−9)	3 (−16)	−2 (−19)
Average precipitation inches (mm)	0.59 (15)	0.56 (14)	0.63 (16)	0.37 (9.4)	0.36 (9.1)	0.17 (4.3)	0.51 (13)	0.75 (19)	0.59 (15)	0.85 (22)	0.57 (14)	0.41 (10)	6.36 (160.8)
Average snowfall inches (cm)	0.2 (0.51)	0.2 (0.51)	0 (0)	0 (0)	0 (0)	0 (0)	0 (0)	0 (0)	0 (0)	0 (0)	0 (0)	0.3 (0.76)	0.7 (1.78)
Source: http://www.wrcc.dri.edu/cgi-bin/cliMAIN.pl?az9114
