= Cookie Jar Butte =

Butte in Glen Canyon National Recreation Area in Kane County, Utah, United States

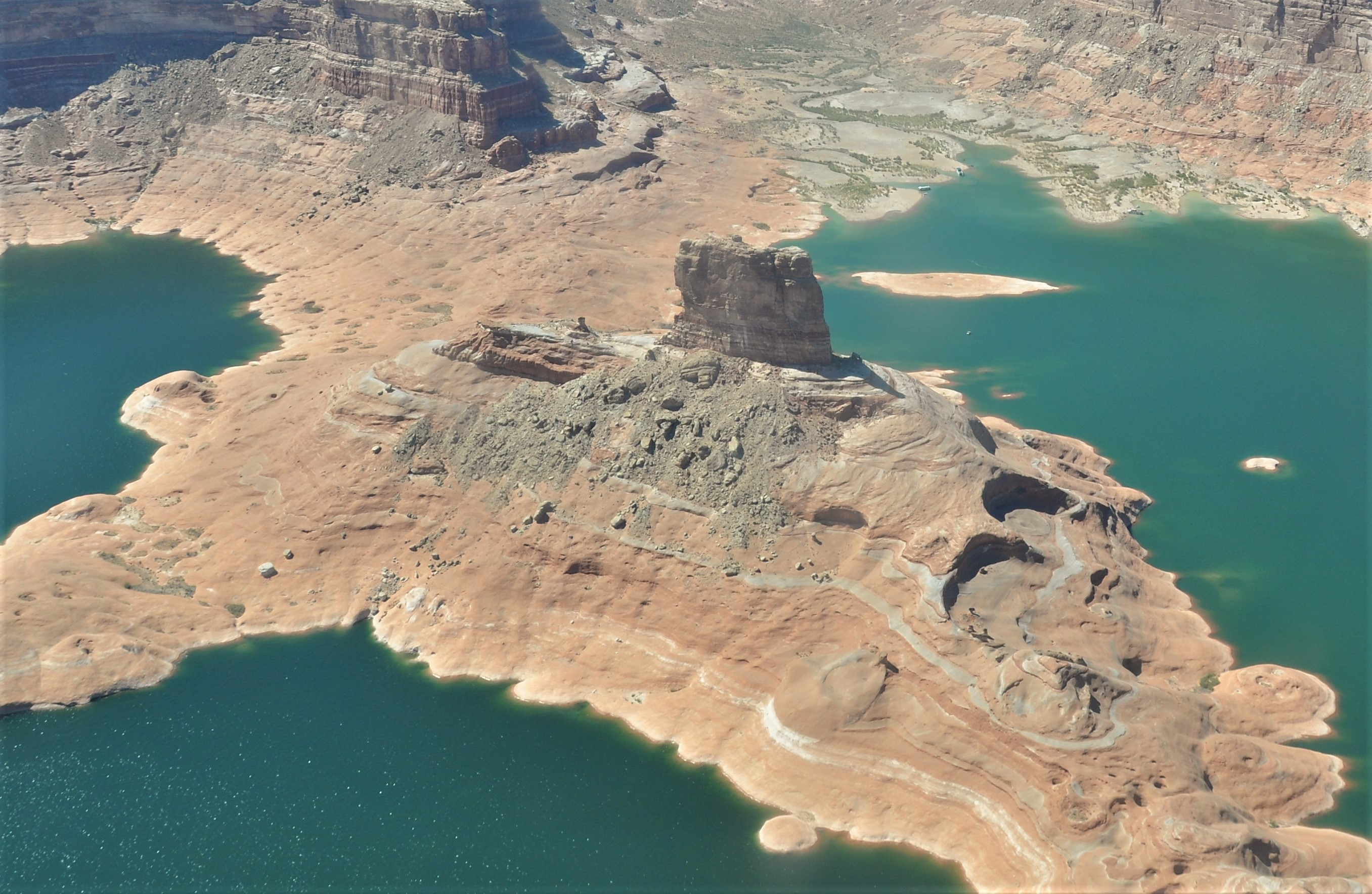

Highest point
- Elevation: 4,344 ft (1,324 m) NGVD 29
- Prominence: 604 ft (184 m)
- Coordinates: 37°05′25″N 111°18′14″W

Geography
- Location within Utah Location within the United States
- Location: Glen Canyon National Recreation Area; Kane County, Utah, U.S.
- Parent range: Colorado Plateau
- Topo map: USGS Gunsight Butte

Geology
- Rock age: Jurassic
- Rock type: Entrada Sandstone

Cookie Jar Butte is a tower in Kane County, Utah, in the United States with an elevation of 4,311 feet (1,314 m). It is located in Padre Bay on the north shore of Lake Powell.
