= Domínguez–Escalante expedition =

Spanish journey of exploration in what is now the southwestern United States

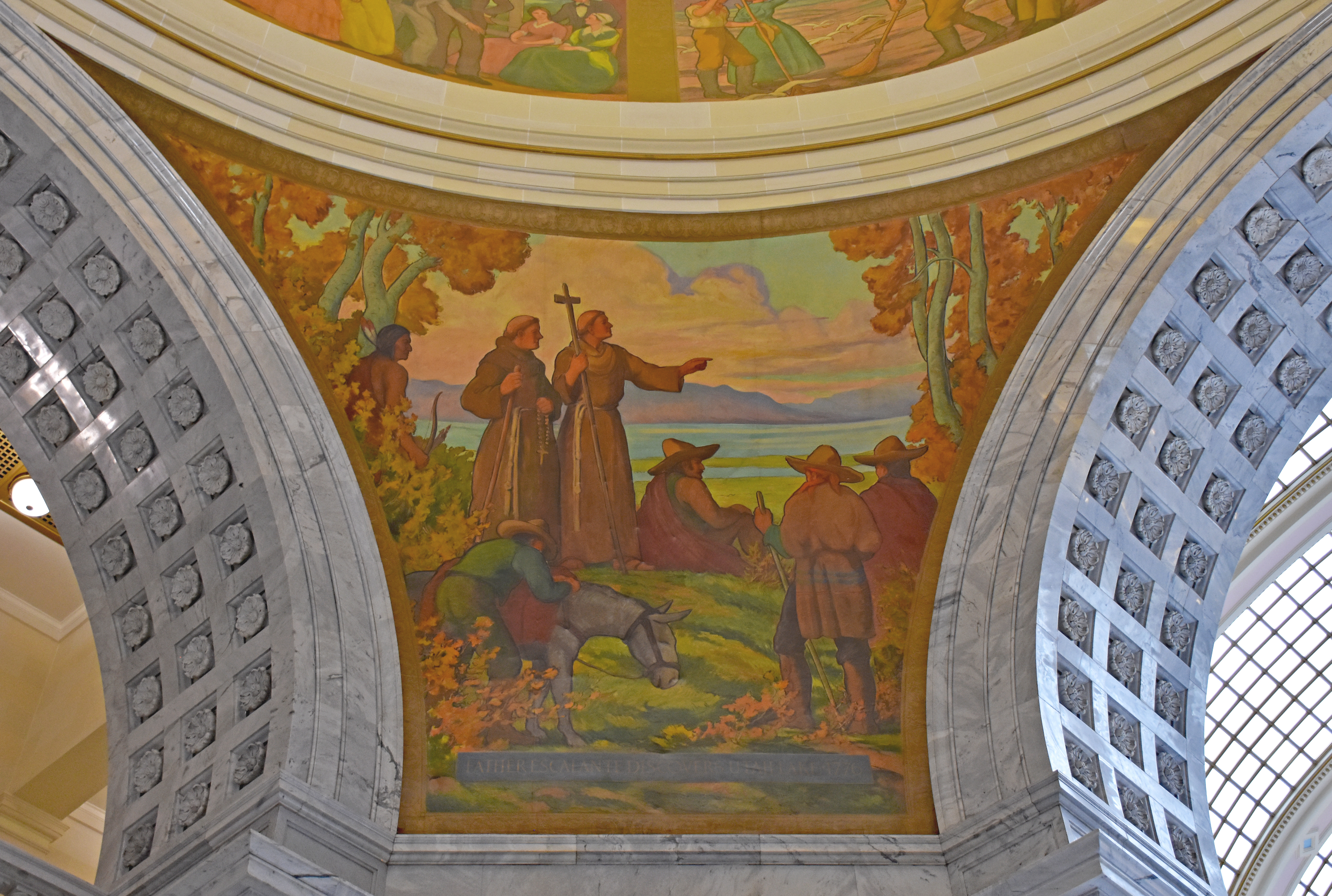
- Father Escalante Discovers Utah Lake, 1776 in the rotunda of the Utah State Capitol
- Country: New Spain
- Leader: Atanasio Domínguez; Silvestre Vélez de Escalante
- Start: Santa Fe de Nuevo México (modern-day Santa Fe, New Mexico); 1776
- End: 1777
- Goal: Find a route from Nuevo México, to the Spanish missions in The Californias

The Domínguez–Escalante Expedition was a Spanish journey of exploration conducted in 1776 by two Franciscan priests, Atanasio Domínguez and Silvestre Vélez de Escalante, to find an overland route from Santa Fe, New Mexico, to their Roman Catholic mission in Monterey, on the coast of modern day central California. Domínguez, Vélez de Escalante, and Bernardo de Miera y Pacheco, acting as the expedition's cartographer, traveled with ten men from Santa Fe through many unexplored portions of the American West, including present-day western Colorado, Utah, and northern Arizona. Along part of the journey, they were aided by three indigenous guides of the Timpanogos tribe (Ute people).

The land was harsh and unforgiving, and hardships encountered during travel forced the group to return to Santa Fe before reaching Las Californias. Maps and documentation produced by the expedition aided future travelers. Part of the Domínguez–Escalante route eventually became an early template for the Old Spanish Trail, a trade route from Santa Fe to Pacific Coast settlements.

== Explorers ==
=== Atanasio Domínguez ===
Fray Francisco Atanasio Domínguez was born in Mexico City about 1740, and in 1757, at the age of 17, joined the Franciscan order. In October 1772, Domínguez was at the Convent of Veracruz as Commissary of the Third Order. He arrived in Santa Fe on March 22, 1776, in present-day New Mexico, of the Mexican province to inspect the Custody of the Conversion of St. Paul and investigate opening an overland route from Santa Fe to Monterey, California. Upon his return to Santa Fe and Mexico City, Domínguez submitted to his Franciscan superiors a report that was highly critical of the administration of the New Mexico missions. His views caused him to fall out of favor with the Franciscans in power, leading him to an assignment to an obscure post at a Sonoran Desert mission in the Sonora y Sinaloa Province in northern Mexico.

In 1777, Domínguez returned to Mexico and was the chaplain of presidios in Nueva Vizcaya. In 1800, he was at Janos, Sonora, Mexico. He died between 1803 and 1805.

=== Silvestre Vélez de Escalante ===
Fray Francisco Silvestre Vélez de Escalante was born in Treceño, Cantabria, Spain about 1750. Although he is commonly known as "Escalante," "de Escalante" references Escalante, Spain so he is correctly referred to as "Vélez de Escalante" or just "Vélez." When he was 17 he became a Franciscan in the Convento Grande in Mexico City. In 1774 he came to present-day New Mexico in the Mexican province; he was first stationed at Laguna pueblo and then in January 1775 assigned as a minister to the Zuni. In June 1776 he was summoned by Domínguez for the expedition to California and remained in New Mexico for two years following the expedition. He died at the age of 30 in April 1780 in Parral, Mexico, during his return journey to Mexico City for medical treatment. Vélez de Escalante was known for his journal, in which he described the expeditions he went on.

Escalante namesakes include Escalante Desert, Escalante River, Escalante (town), Grand Staircase–Escalante National Monument.

=== Bernardo de Miera y Pacheco ===
Bernardo de Miera y Pacheco, a native of Valle de Carriedo, Cantabria, Spain, lived in Chihuahua before he moved to El Paso in 1743. From 1754 to 1756, he lived in Santa Fe. Multi-talented, he was an army engineer, merchant, Indian fighter, government agent, rancher, and artist. It was his experience as a cartographer that made the expedition historic when he produced several maps of the expedition around 1778 and a report on the expedition, which is included in Herbert E. Bolton's Pageant in the Wilderness: The Story of the Escalante Expedition to the Interior Basin. He is also known for his artwork, including a painting of St. Michael on an altar screen in Santa Fe's chapel of San Miguel and statuettes that were in the Zuni church.

=== Timpanog Utes ===
Fathers Domínguez and Escalante named three Timpanogos/Ute Native Americans who joined the expedition as guides:

- "Silvestre", named after Silvestre Escalante, from present day Utah was the main Native guide from Colorado to Utah. Because of his recognition with his and other Ute tribes, the explorers enjoyed safe passage.
- "Joaquín", a 12-year-old boy, joined the expedition with Silvestre as a guide. After leaving Silvestre's village, near present Provo, Utah, Joaquín assisted the explorers on their return trip to Santa Fe, New Mexico. He was baptized there in the Catholic Church.
- "José María", the joined name of the Bible's Joseph and Mary, joined the expedition in Silvestre's village. Like Joaquín, José María was a boy, probably also about 12 years old. He did not complete the journey to Santa Fe; when he saw the terrible treatment administered to one of the servants, he returned to his village.

=== Other explorers ===
Other men who began the expedition in Santa Fe include:

- Don Juan Pedro Cisneros, Alcalde mayor of Zuñi Pueblo
- Don Joaquín Lain, a native of Santa Cruz in Castilla la Vieja and citizen of Santa Fe at the time of the expedition. He died in 1799.
- Lorenzo Olivares from La Villa del Paso, a citizen of El Paso at the time of the expedition
- Andrés Muñiz from Bernalillo, New Mexico served as an interpreter with the Utes language. He was part of Juan María de Rivera's expedition to the Gunnison River in 1775.
- Lucrecio Muñiz was the brother Andrés Muñiz, from Embudo, north of Santa Fe.
- Juan de Aguilar was born in Santa Clara, New Mexico.
- Simon Lucero, a servant to Don Pedro Cisneros, may have been Zuni.

== The expedition ==
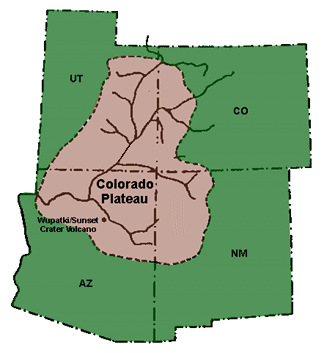
Colorado Plateau

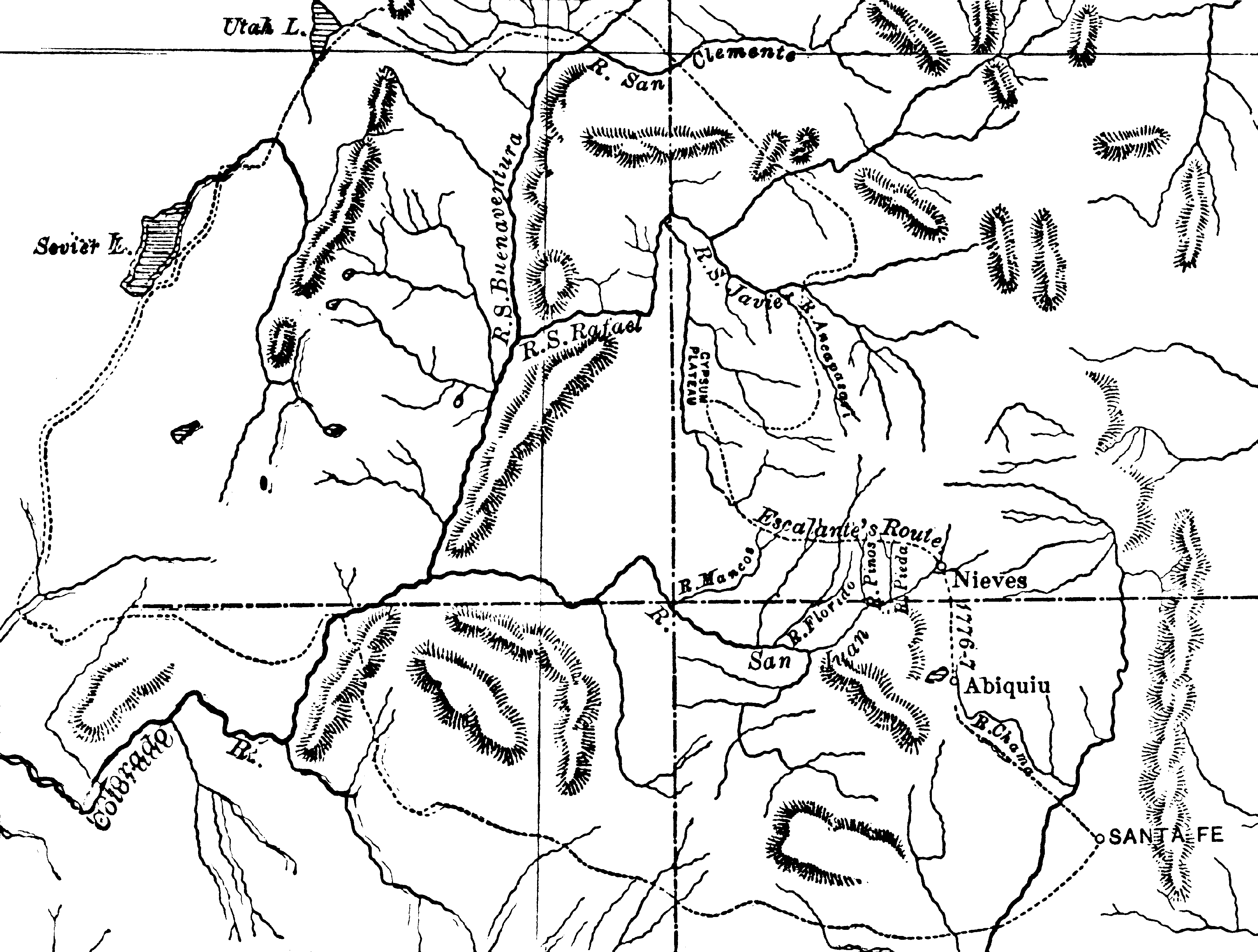
The route of the Domínguez–Escalante expedition of 1776 across the Colorado Plateau

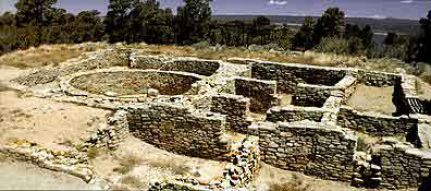
Escalante Pueblo, Dolores, Colorado

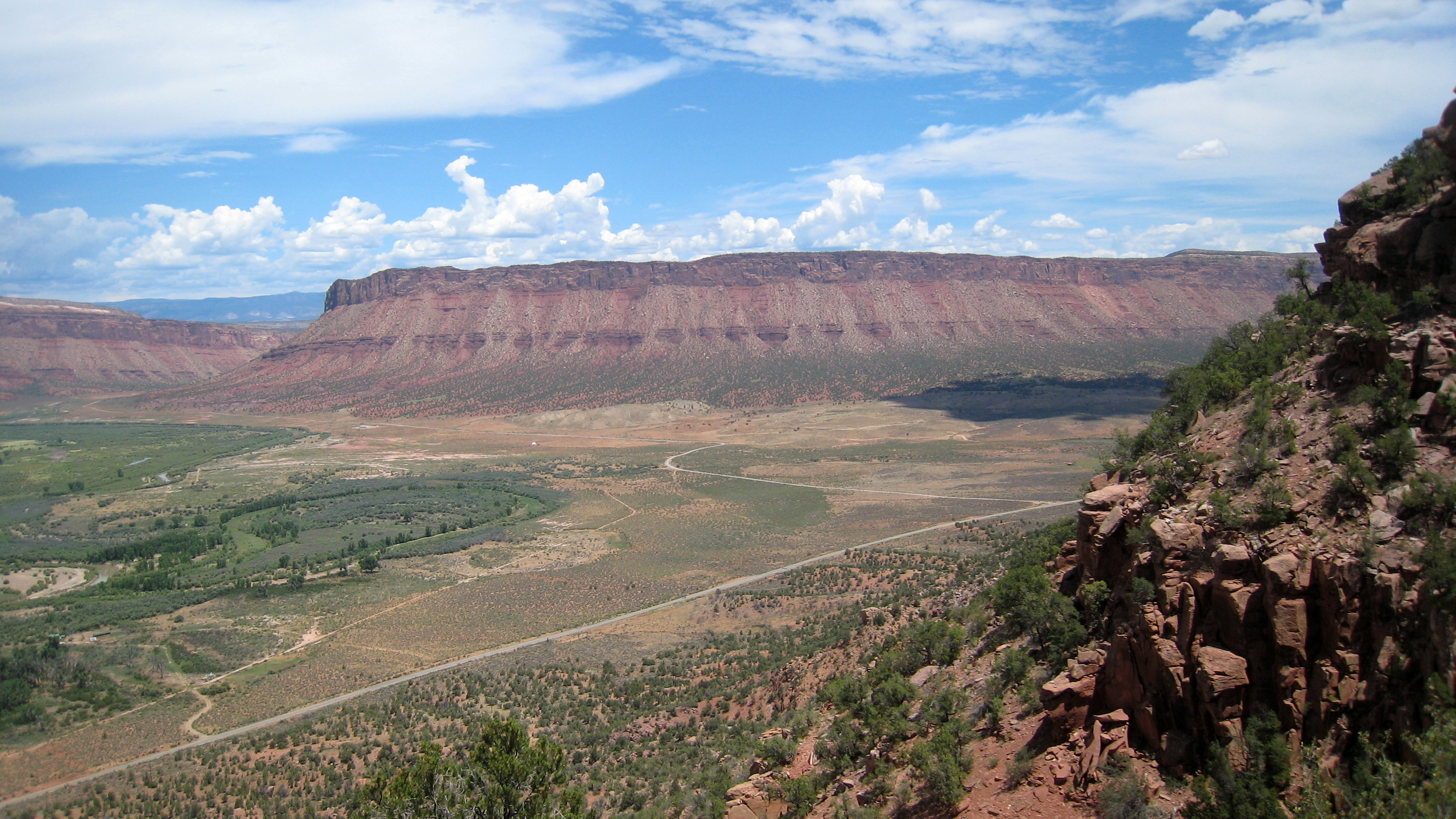
Paradox Valley and Dolores River, western Colorado

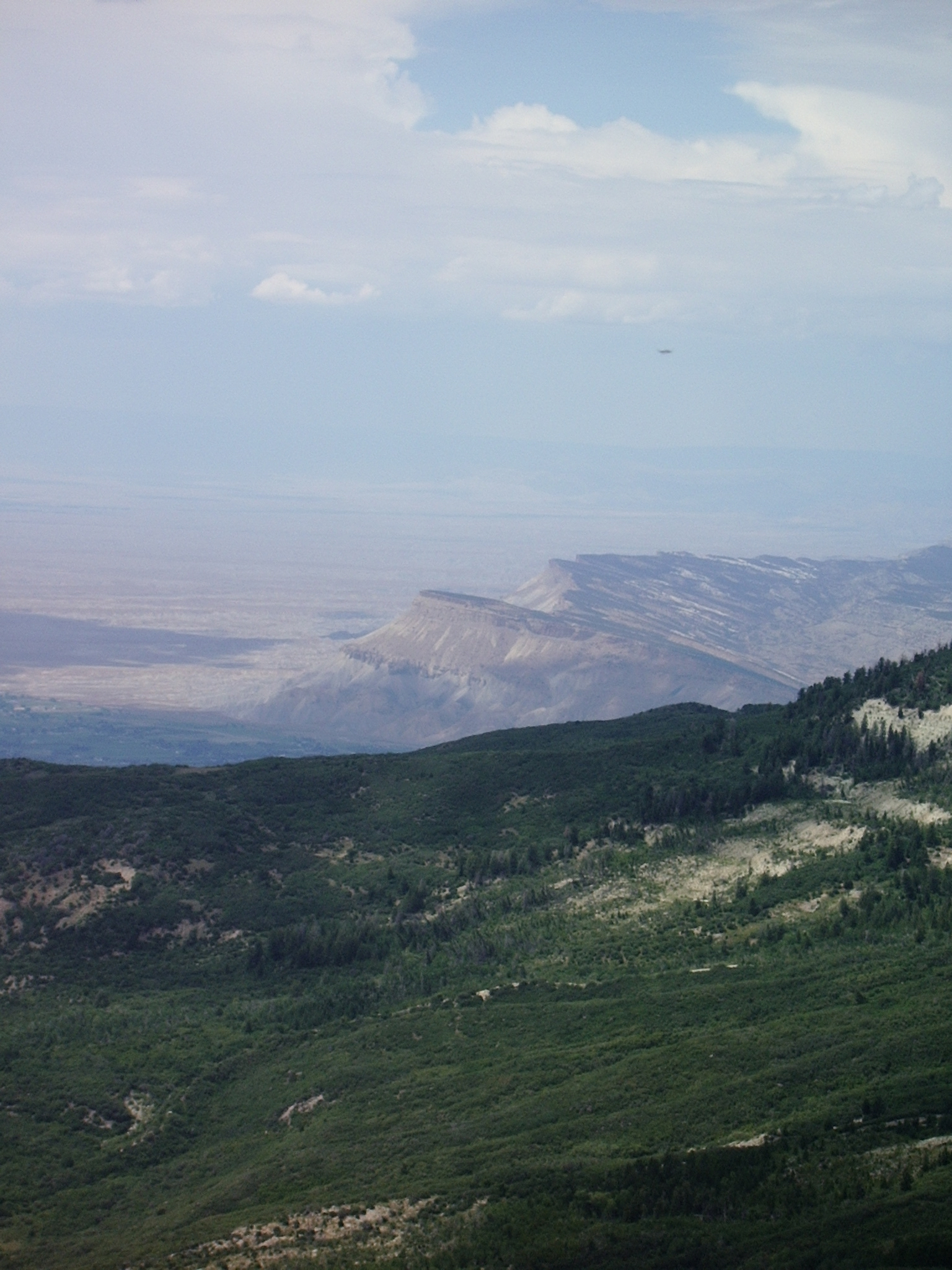
Grand Mesa, western Colorado

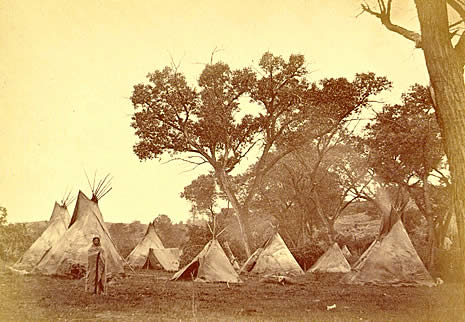
Comanche camp

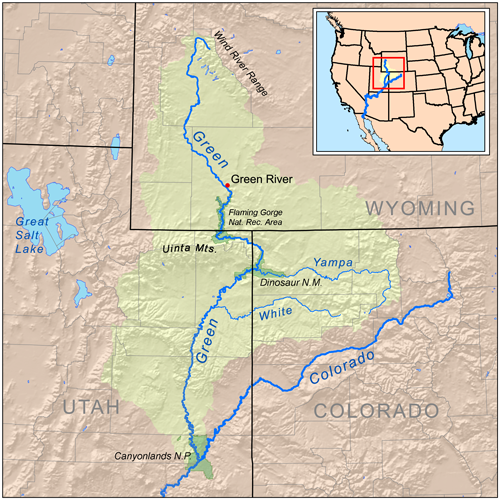
Map of Yampa Plateau, White River, and Green River in northwestern Colorado and northeastern Utah

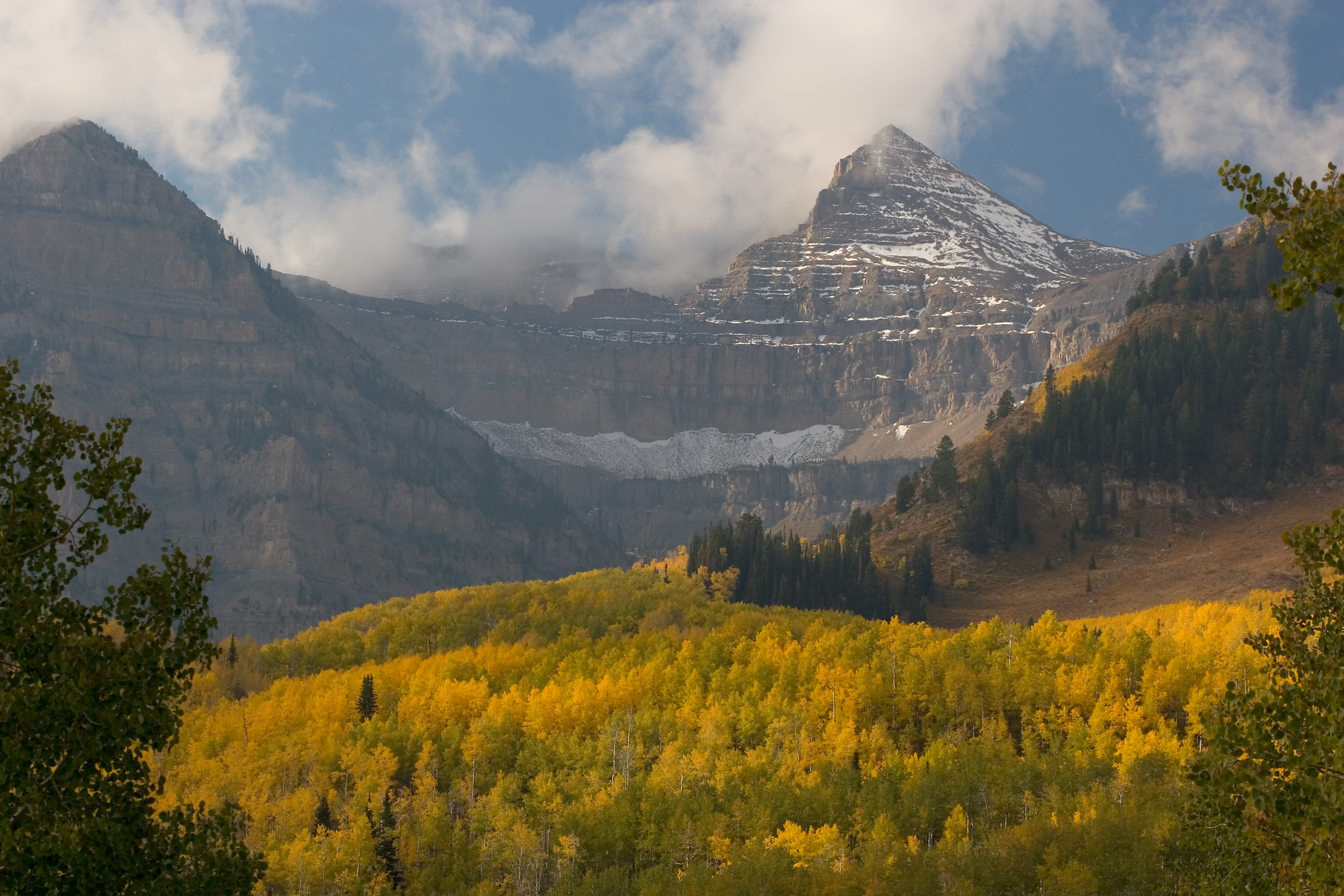
Uinta National Forest, north central Utah

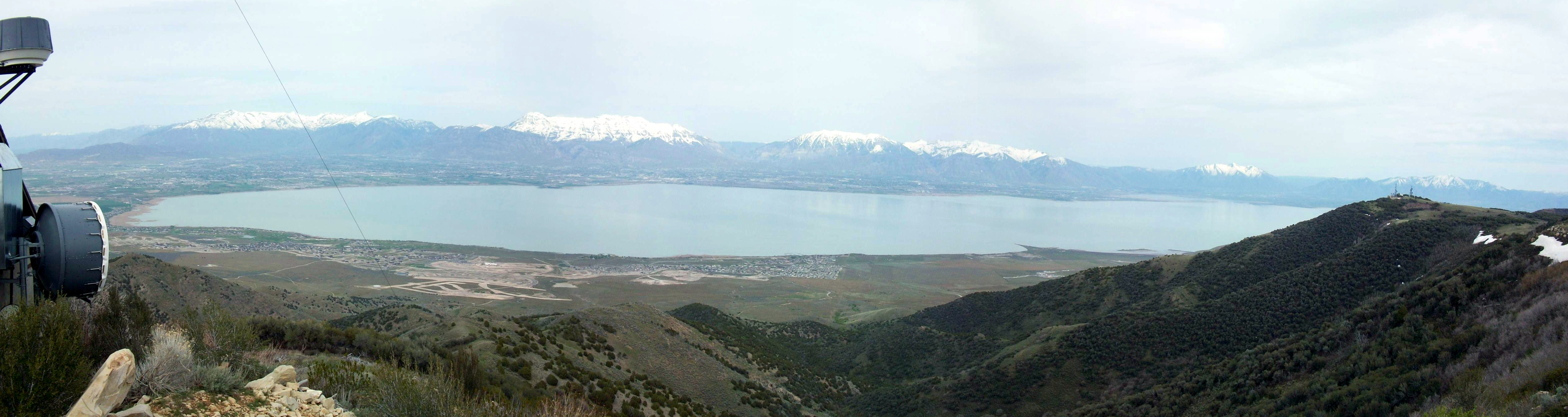
Utah Lake and Utah Valley

The Domínguez–Escalante expedition was undertaken in 1776 with the purpose of finding a route across the largely unexplored continental interior from Santa Fe, New Mexico, to Spanish missions in Las Californias, such as the Spanish presidio at Monterey. On July 29, 1776, Atanasio Domínguez led the expedition from Santa Fe with fellow friar Silvestre Vélez de Escalante and cartographer Bernardo de Miera y Pacheco (Miera). The initial part of their journey followed the route taken by Juan Rivera eleven years earlier into the Ute country of southwestern Colorado. Three Timpanogos guides led them through Colorado and Utah.

These Spanish colonists were the first European men to travel through much of the Colorado Plateau into Utah, and back through Arizona to New Mexico. During the course of their trip, they documented the route and provided detailed information about the "lush, mountainous land filled with game and timber, strange ruins of stone cities and villages, and rivers showing signs of precious metals."

== Route ==
=== New Mexico ===
Santa Rosa de Abiquiú, July 30

The first night of the journey they stayed overnight at the Santa Clara pueblo, north of Santa Fe. From there they "traveled nine leagues, more or less, and arrived at the pueblo of Santa Rosa de Abiquiú, where because of various circumstances we remained on the 31st without traveling, and where by means of a Solemn Mass we again implored the aid of our most holy patrons." From Santa Rosa de Abiquiú pueblo, they traveled north and northwest to a location near present-day Dulce, New Mexico.

=== Colorado ===
Mesa Verde, August 10

From Dulce, they entered present-day Colorado through Arboles, Ignacio, Durango and Hesperus. They camped at the base of the La Plata Mountains near the current Mesa Verde National Park in southwestern Colorado.

Escalante wrote in his journal,

Father Fray Francisco Atanasio [Domínguez] awoke troubled by rheumatic fever which he felt in his face and head since the day before, and it was desirable that we make camp here until he should be better, but the continuous rains, the inclemency of the weather, and the great dampness of the place forced us to leave it. Going north, and having traveled a little more than half a league, we turned to the northwest, went on a league and then swung west through valleys of very beautiful timber and abundant pasturage, roses, and various other flowers. After going two leagues we were again caught in a very heavy rain. Father Fray Francisco Atanasio became worse and the road impassable, and so, having traveled with great difficulty two more leagues to the west, we had to camp on the bank of the first of two little rivers which form the San Lázaro, otherwise called Río de los Mancos. The pasturage continues in great abundance. Today four and a half leagues.

The men camped alongside the Mancos River, a few miles below where it runs into Mesa Verde. The river was named from the word manco, meaning "one-handed" or "crippled" after one of the men fell into a river, injuring his hand.

Escalante and Domínguez Pueblos, August 13

Near present-day Dolores, Escalante and Domínguez found and recorded Ancestral Puebloan ruins in southwestern Colorado, the first white men to do so. Escalante Pueblo and Domínguez Pueblos, named for them, are included within the Anasazi Heritage Center.

As recorded of other potential settlement locations, Escalante noted the area's bounties: beautiful surroundings supplied with water, pasture, timber wood and fire wood. The men traveled north, staying west of the San Juan Mountains. They crossed the Dolores River several times and camped along its banks northeast of the site of present-day Cahone. They met two Native American slaves, whom they called Genízaro and Coyote. The men had left their pueblo without notice to join the group. One man was named "Felipe", the other "Juan Domingo". Although they were not needed, the expedition took them on.

The expedition continued west and northwest, crossing the Dolores River. They traveled through a canyon before they came to an area near current Egnar and traveled along the San Miguel River to an area about five miles west of Nucla. The land became increasingly arid, with less pasture land and insufficient water for the horses, and the canyons difficult. Having seen signs of settlements, which they called rancherías, and realizing that they needed assistance, they searched for Utes who might serve as their guides.

Nucla, August 23

Northeast of Nucla, where the San Miguel River meets the Dolores River, the group met a member of a Ute tribe. They camped along a tributary creek of the San Miguel River and traveled east through the Uncompahgre National Forest onto the Uncompahgre Plateau. They went to an area near Montrose and met with a Ute chief. Learning of Timpanogo men in the area, the party resumed traveling in a northwesterly direction to Olathe, crossing the north fork of the Gunnison River and coming to the site of what is now Hotchkiss.

Bowie, September 1–2

Continuing travel to the northeast, the expedition reached the area of Bowie, encountering eighty Ute men on horses. Most were from the village that Escalante and Domínguez sought. Some of the men accompanied them to the Ute village, consisting of about thirty "tents". Father Domínguez met the chief and his sons. With villagers gathered, Domínguez preached through Andrés Muñiz, the interpreter. He expressed concern about their practices of plural marriage and naming people for animals, which he said was a lower form of life than man. They referred to one of the Ute guides as "Silvestre", and said that he was a Laguna, a Timpanogo from the Utah Lake region. The Ute men strongly encouraged the expedition to turn back, because they would encounter the Comanche on their trip west. The Ute worried that if they were harmed, the Spanish governor would blame the Ute. The leaders responded that they needed to continue to find a lost Father Garces and put their faith in God to watch out for them. Violating the agreement on which the expedition had gained permission for this journey through Ute territory, and the spiritual purpose behind it, the interpreter Muñiz and his brother Lucrecio traded goods for guns, as they feared the Comanche warriors.

Having arranged for guides, they traded their horses for fresh ones from the Ute. They gained agreement to continue the expedition, guided by "Silvestre" and a boy they named "Joaquín". The party traveled through what is now protected federal land, including the Grand Mesa National Forest, to the south side of Battlement Mesa. Three Ute women and a child that they met exchanged for piñón nuts some berries that they had been drying in the sun. The group crossed the Colorado River at Una, where it ran west and southwest and was fed by the Dolores River. The group met some Ute who helped resolve questions with "Silvestre" about the best route to take next. The party learned from other Ute that the Comanche had moved to the east, away from their planned route. Silvestre warned them of a high hill which they reached; it was steep with loose rocks that caused a few mules to fall down its side 20 or more feet. The party had a strenuous climb to the top. They had traveled on the Roan Plateau and in the southern end of Douglas Canyon. From the top of a high ridge, Silvestre pointed to the north, to the Comanchería, and to the west, where his people lived in Utah Lake Valley.

Rangely, September 10

Having traveled north and west through the Cañon Pintado, the expedition entered present-day Rio Blanco County, Colorado, named for the White River (which they named the Río de San Clemente), which runs into Utah at its western border. They crossed the White River just east of Rangely. After weeks of mountain, canyon and mesa travel, the land here was flatter. They followed a bison trail heading in the direction they wished to travel.

=== Utah ===
The travel journal kept by Escalante provided the first written descriptions of the geography and people in the area that would later become the state of Utah.

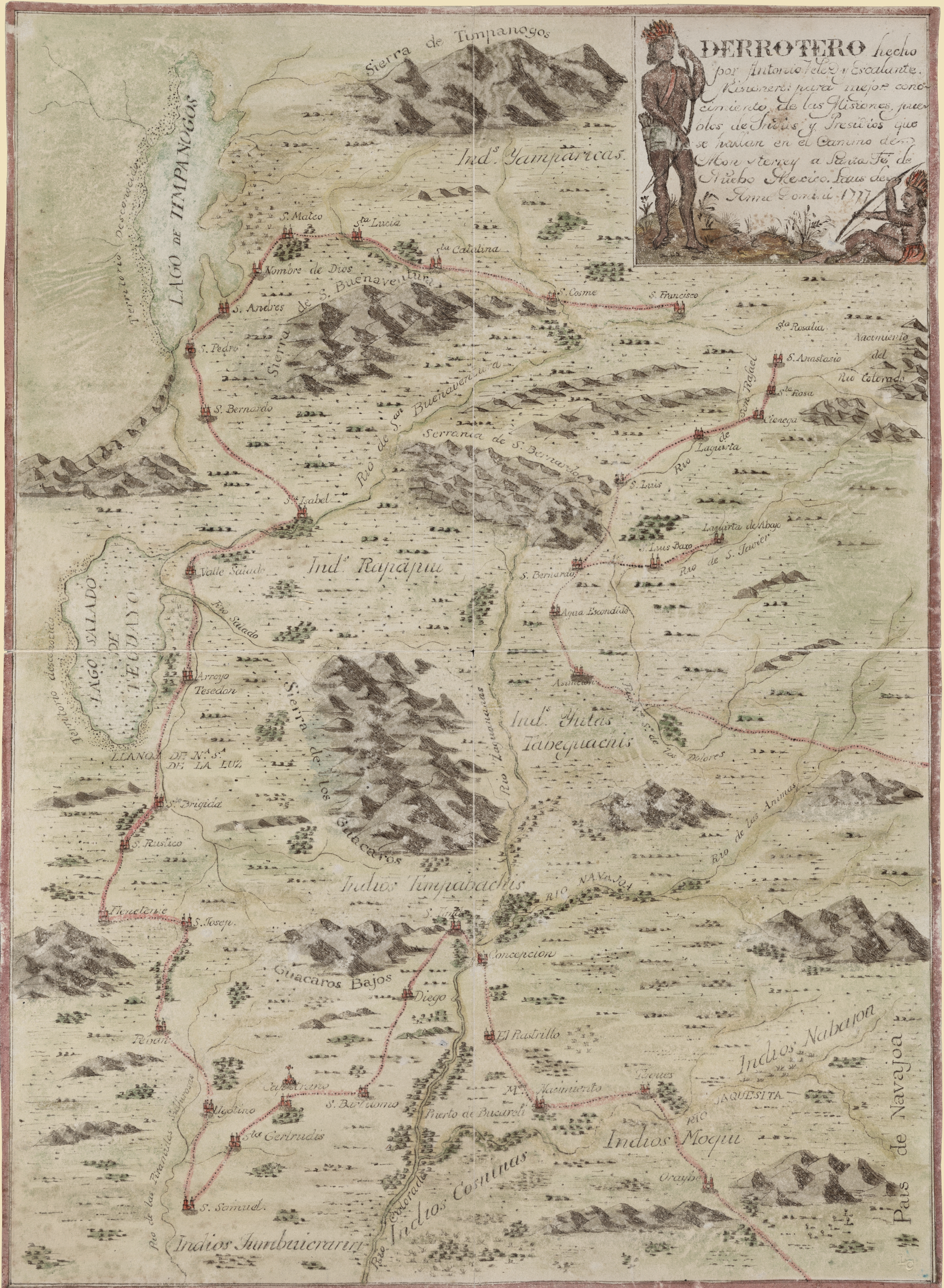
1777 map of western part of the expedition's route through Utah and Arizona. This map was probably drawn by Miera, but is significantly different from the subsequent maps he drew of the area explored.

Yampa Plateau, September 11

With their provisions running low, a few men successfully chased and killed a bison on the Yampa Plateau in present-day Uintah County, Utah. Traveling northwest, they next came upon the Green River (which they named the Río de San Buenaventura) and Split Mountain, which they described as follows: "Here it has meadows abounding in pasturage and good land for raising crops, with facilities for irrigation. It must be somewhat more than a league wide and its length may reach five leagues. The river enters this meadow between two high cliffs which, after forming a sort of corral, come so close together that one can scarcely see the opening through which the river comes." They camped off the Green River near present-day Jensen, Utah. At a stand of six cottonwoods, Lain carved his name in one of the trees, with the year 1776 with a large cross and two small crosses. Heading southwest from Jensen, the expedition noticed fresh horse tracks which they determined to be Comanche following a Ute bison-hunting party. They camped at Horseshoe Bend on the Green River and then headed west to what is now Myton, where they found ruins of a pueblo. Continuing westward they camped near Duchesne, Fruitland, and Soldier Springs. The route from Jensen to Soldier Springs was roughly along the current U.S. Highway 40.

Uinta National Forest, September 20

The expedition traveled westward through the present Uinta National Forest, from Strawberry Valley, along Fifth Water Creek and Diamond Creek, to Wanrhodes Canyon. They experienced difficult traveling conditions: cool temperatures, blustery winds and varying types of hazardous terrain; soft ground with holes that caused the horses to sink, dense groves of cottonwood and shrubs, and defiles. As the expedition moved slowly in the difficult terrain, "Silvestre", anxious to reach his home, pressed ahead of the expedition many times, so that the main group compelled him to stay with them.

On September 22, not far from Wanrhodes Canyon, "From the top of the last ridge we saw in front of us and not very far away many columns of smoke arising in the same sierra. The guide Silvestre said that they must have been made by his people who were out hunting. We replied to them with other smoke signals so that if they had already seen us they would not take us to be enemies and thus flee or welcome us with arrows. They replied with larger smoke signals in the pass through which we must travel to the Lake, and this caused us to believe that they had already seen us, because this is the most prompt and common signal used in any extraordinary occurrence by all the people of this part of America… And about two o'clock in the morning, the hour when according to [Silvestre's] opinion there might be one or more Indians close at hand, he made a long speech in his language, giving them to understand that we were peaceable people, friendly and good."

Utah Lake, September 23

Silvestre and Joaquín were given woolen cloth and red ribbon which they used to adorn themselves before entering the village of their people. Silvestre tied the cloth around his head, with the long ends hanging down his back, and wore a cloak that had been given to him earlier. The men traveled out of the canyon, into a meadow and entered the Utah Lake Valley, and the lake which they called the Lake of the Timpanogos Tribe. They saw many plumes of smoke and meadows recently burnt or still burning, which they took to mean that the Timpanog Utes believed they were Comanches or another hostile Native American tribe.

After they had camped near present Spanish Fork, a small contingent including Silvestre, Joaquín, Muñiz and Domínguez traveled ahead to a Native American village on the Provo River, north of Provo and east of Utah Lake. Men came out to meet them, brandishing weapons, but as soon as they recognized Silvestre, the men from the expedition were warmly welcomed and embraced. They met with the tribal leader, Chief Turunianchi. The Native Americans were greatly surprised to learn that they had traveled safely through Comanche territory. The purpose of the visit was explained, including the desire to share their faith. Domínguez asked for another guide to continue their search for Father Garces. Joaquín would continue on the journey as well as a boy they named "José María". The fathers gave gifts to the tribe and received a large quantity of dried fish for their travels. Understanding the desire of the expedition to return, the tribe offered the use of their land to build houses for other Spaniards who might wish to join them on their lands after they completed their journey.

The Utah Lake Valley was described by Escalante as conducive to settlement. The temperature was comfortable day and night. There were four rivers, large meadows for farming, and sufficient fish, fowl and animals for hunting, wood for homes and fires, pasture land for horses and more. Because of the abundance of fish, the Timpanogos are described as "fish-eaters". Although they heard of Salt Lake Valley, and the salty lake located there, the expedition did not travel into the Salt Lake area.

Payson, September 26

The group left Silvestre's village near Spanish Fork on September 25 and traveled southwest. They camped next at sites near Springville, Payson, Starr, Levan and Scipio. The route from Springville south to Scipio is essentially the route of current Interstate Highway 15. They came across several small groups of Native Americans along the way, most of whom were quite friendly and social. Some of the men had thick beards and were thought to look more in appearance like Spanish men than Native Americans; Men of this tribe were friendly, helpful and gracious and like "Silvestre's" tribe, encouraged the Spaniards to return. After Scipio they had difficulty finding pastureland and water fit for drinking. At times the only water that they could find was water made salty by the region's salt beds, which made the horses ill. Pasture land had become increasingly scarce. To add to their troubles, "José María" walked off one morning to return to his village, disappointed by the ill treatment of one of the servants.

Beaver River Valley, October 5

A cold wind blew in followed by heavy snowfall, hail and rain that prevented travel for several days. Conditions were very uncomfortable, with no wood to create a fire. Once they attempted traveling the horses were bogged down or fell down in the snow-covered mire. Domínguez and Escalante weighed the risks of continuing their expedition to California: all the mountains that they would need to pass to get to California were covered with snow. If they continued with hardships, their last guide, "Joaquín" might desert them, too. They reflected that the missionary goals for the trip had been met; they had invitations to return for future settlement. Thus, they decided that rather than heading west, they must begin heading south and return to Santa Fe. Heading south, they met with greater success; the ground was not so difficult for the horses to travel as the previous day and they camped near current Milford. There snow had melted into a pool of water and there was pasture land for the horses. This was the end of the territory of their friends, the long-bearded Utes.

They came upon members of a Native American tribe who were quite suspicious of the group of men. Mostly as a means to lead the men away from their tribe, the chief and another man led the expedition from an area near present Kanarraville to an area near present-day Pintura where the guides silently left the Spaniards. They continued their journey south towards Toquerville. Although several days of travel had been quite hot, they came upon mild weather, green meadows and an area where a Native American tribe grew maize. Near Hurricane the land became sandy, making travel difficult for the horses, and that day they did not find pasture land or water. They camped next on lands southwest of Hurricane near the border of Arizona.

=== Arizona ===
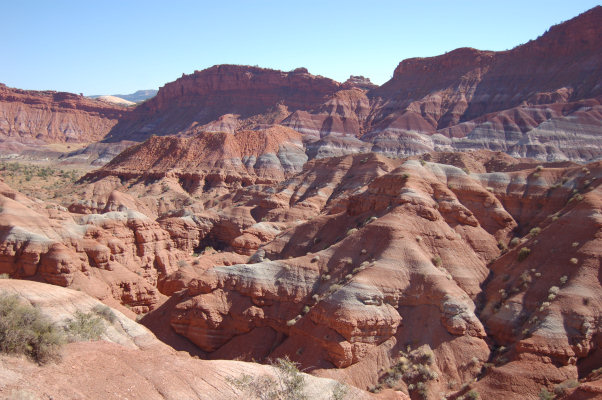
Paria Canyon

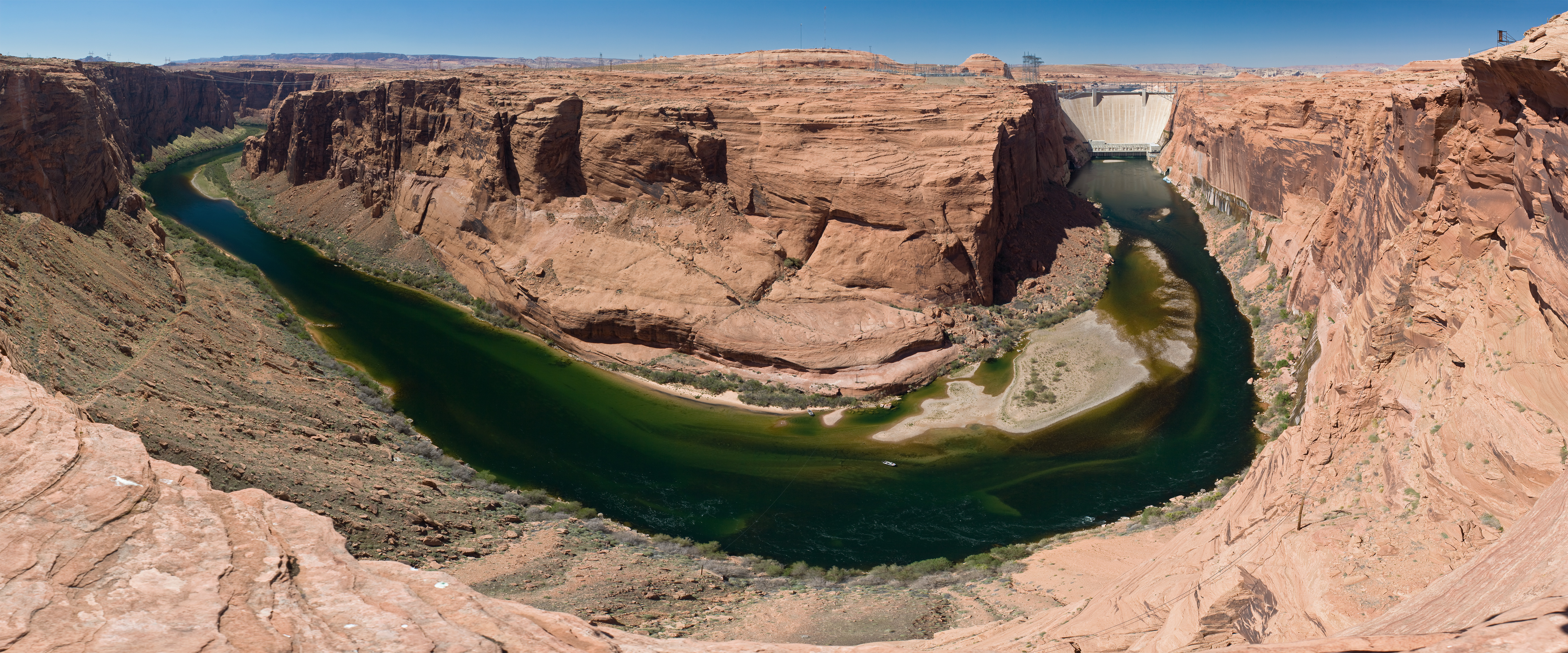
Glen Canyon

Mojave Desert, northwestern Arizona, October 16

The expedition wanted to travel south to the Colorado River but learned from eight Native American men that although they were not far from the Colorado River it was unapproachable, surrounded by a great, deep canyon (the Grand Canyon). Out of provisions, they sacrificed one of the horses for food and the next day sought water. Miera was ill, unable to eat and nearly unable to speak. Near Diamond Butte, they came upon five Native Americans, called Yubuincariris, who showed them to an area of good water and took a few men back to their village to trade for some food, wild sheep, prickly pear and grass seeds. The Native Americans also shared information about other neighboring tribes. Although they knew nothing of Monterey, they had heard of the travels of Father Garces.

Paria River, October 22

The expedition continued to experience difficulties due to illness and lack of water, pastureland and supplies as they made their way east across what is now the state of Arizona, sometimes heading north enough to cross into what is now Utah. Many stops were made along the Paria River canyons and plateau, Wahweap and Glen Canyon.

Crossing of the Fathers, Colorado River, October 26 – November 7

Guided by local Native Americans, the expedition proceeded to the site of present-day Lees Ferry, but found it too difficult a crossing. They were led to a second ford of the Colorado River, where they carved steps into the canyon wall. This ford, named the Crossing of the Fathers, is now submerged beneath Lake Powell.

Northeastern Arizona, November 8–12

While crossing northeastern Arizona, the party endured snowy, cold weather, had little food or water, and faced difficulties in finding a good trail. Their journal records these difficulties, but the record of their route is sketchy because they were too busy trying to survive. However, in 1884, Harry L. Baldwin, a member of a U.S. Geological Survey party, discovered a large sandstone monolith bearing an inscription with a Spanish name and the date "1776". In 1995, the Palace of the Governors of the Museum of New Mexico in Santa Fe undertook a search expedition and located a large sandstone monolith, as described in the records of 1884, still bearing the "1776" date. A return visit in 1996 confirmed the discovery and resulted in the opinion that this was a site visited by the Domínguez–Escalante expedition, probably on November 12, 1776.

Pueblo of Oraybi, November 16

Finally, the party arrived at a Hopi (Moqui) pueblo, Oraybi, on the Third Mesa, where they were sheltered, fed, and provisioned.

=== Return to New Mexico ===
Northwestern New Mexico and Santa Fe, November 17 – January 2, 1777

Continuing their journey through northwestern New Mexico, the party finally arrived in Santa Fe on January 2, 1777.

== Old Spanish Trail ==
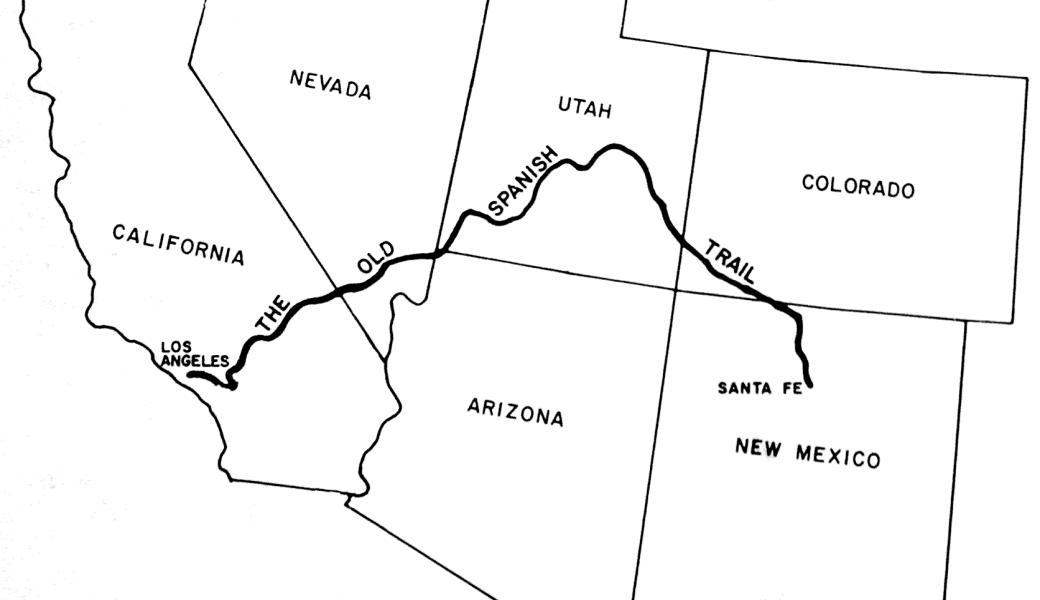
Old Spanish Trail (trade route), the route from Santa Fe to Salt Lake Valley was documented for future travelers during the Domínguez–Escalante expedition

The maps and information resulting from the expedition provided useful information for future travel, and their route from Santa Fe to the Salt Lake Valley became the first segment of a route later known as the Old Spanish Trail.

== See also ==
- History of New Mexico
- Dolores County, Colorado
- Padre Bay
- Southern Paiute
- Ute Mountain Ute Tribe
