= Padre Bay =

Bay of Lake Powell in Kane County, Utah, United States

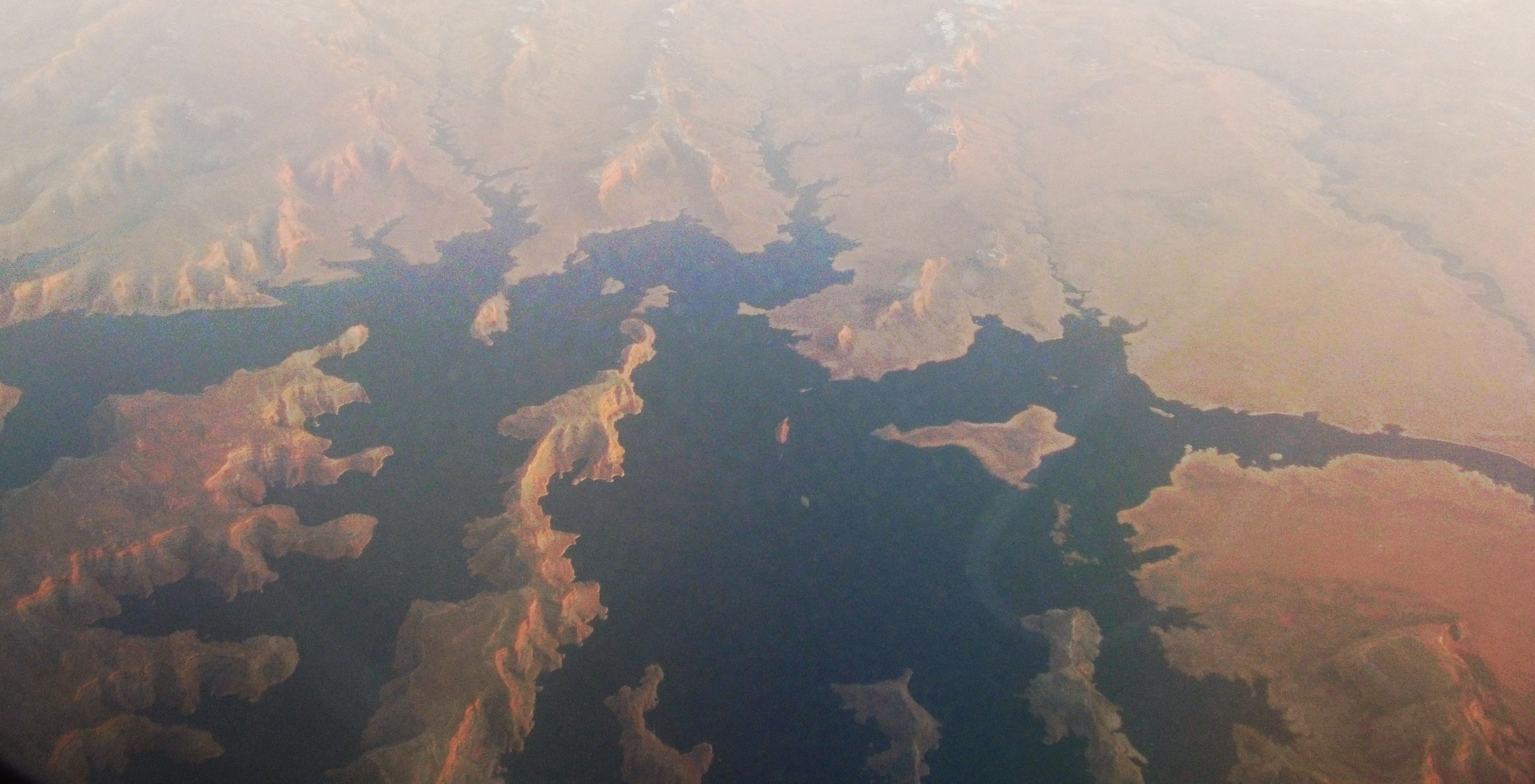
- Aerial view of Padre Bay of Lake Powell, January 2012

- Location within Utah
- Location: Lake Powell, Kane County and San Juan County, Utah
- Coordinates: 37°05′48″N 111°18′13″W
- Type: bay

Padre Bay is a bay within Lake Powell, on the Colorado River in Kane County and San Juan County, Utah. Its waters reach an elevation of 3,704 feet (1,129 meters). Located 13.5 miles northeast of Glen Canyon Dam in Lake Powell, Padre Bay is the largest expanse of open water on the man made lake. Padre Bay is bounded by Alstrom Point and the island of Gunsight Butte on the west and Gooseneck Point on the east. Cookie Jar Butte lies between them on the north shore of the bay. At the southern mouth of the bay, north of Dominguez Butte on the south shore is Padres Butte, formerly an island, now with lower water in the lake the tip of Padre Point. Padres Butte marks the location of the Crossing of the Fathers, which is approximately a mile west of the butte. It currently lies under nearly four hundred feet of water.

== History ==
Padre Bay is named for the padres who first recorded and used the Crossing of the Fathers, a historical river crossing of the Colorado River in 1776. A group of ten men, the Dominguez–Escalante Expedition, led by the priests Silvestre Vélez de Escalante and his superior Francisco Atanasio Domínguez, were en route home from a failed attempt to find an overland trail to Monterey, California. They had first attempted to cross the Colorado River at Lee's Ferry in Arizona.

== Attractions ==
Nearby hiking attractions are the "weathering pits," perfectly round depressions that range between 10 and 50 feet (3 to 15 m) in diameter and are between 20 and 70 feet (6 to 21 m) deep.
