= Alstrom Point =

Elevation point in Kane County, Utah, USA

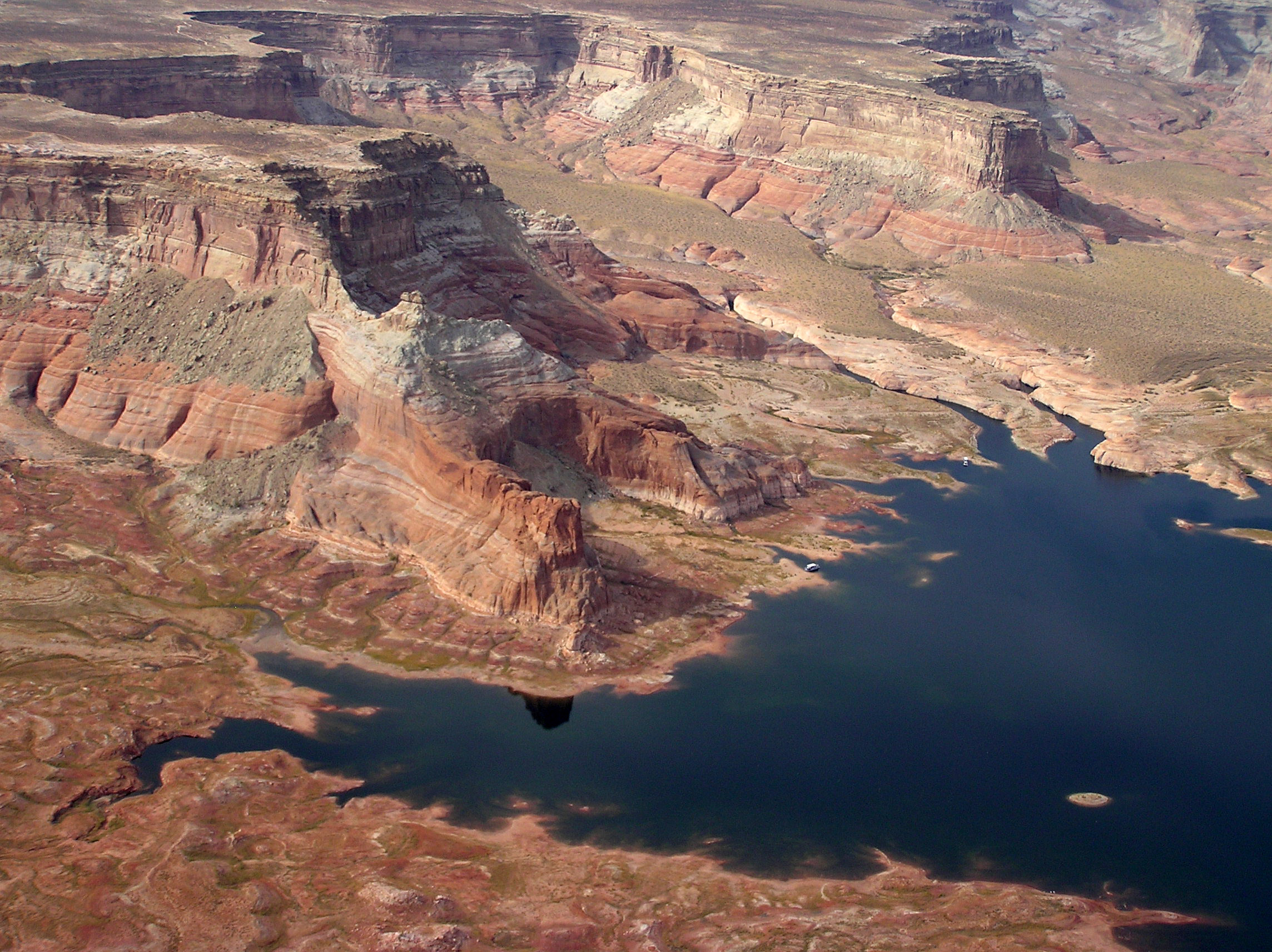
- Alstrom Point upper left, from southeast

Highest point
- Elevation: 4,685 ft (1,428 m)
- Prominence: 185 ft (56 m)
- Parent peak: Romana Mesa
- Isolation: 1.23 mi (1.98 km)
- Coordinates: 37°03′32″N 111°21′53″W

Geography
- Location within Utah Location within the United States
- Location: Glen Canyon National Recreation Area; Kane County, Utah, U.S.
- Parent range: Colorado Plateau
- Topo map: USGS Gunsight Butte

Geology
- Rock age: Jurassic
- Rock type: Entrada Sandstone

Alstrom Point is a 4,685-foot (1,428 meter) elevation landmark located in Glen Canyon National Recreation Area, in Kane County of southern Utah. It is situated 12 miles (19 km) northeast of the town of Page. This iconic landmark of the Lake Powell area is a cape that extends south into Lake Powell between Padre Bay and Warm Creek Bay. Alstrom Point rises nearly 1,000 feet above the lake when it's full. It is composed primarily of Entrada Sandstone, similar to Romana Mesa immediately south, and Gunsight Butte 1.5 miles (2.4 km) to the east. The Entrada Sandstone is overlain by Romana Sandstone, and capped by Morrison Formation. The Entrada Sandstone, which was originally deposited as sandy mud on a tidal flat, is believed to have formed about 160 million years ago during the Jurassic period as a giant sand sea, the largest in Earth's history.

Alstrom Point is an excellent photography and camping spot. It briefly appears in the 1968 film Planet of the Apes. It has been used as a location for music videos such as Michael Bolton's Said I Loved You...But I Lied and Britney Spears' I'm Not a Girl, Not Yet a Woman.

According to the Köppen climate classification system, Alstrom Point is located in an arid climate zone with hot, very dry summers, and chilly winters with very little snow.

This geographical feature's toponym was officially adopted in 1986 by the U.S. Board on Geographic Names.

== See also ==
- Colorado Plateau

== Gallery ==
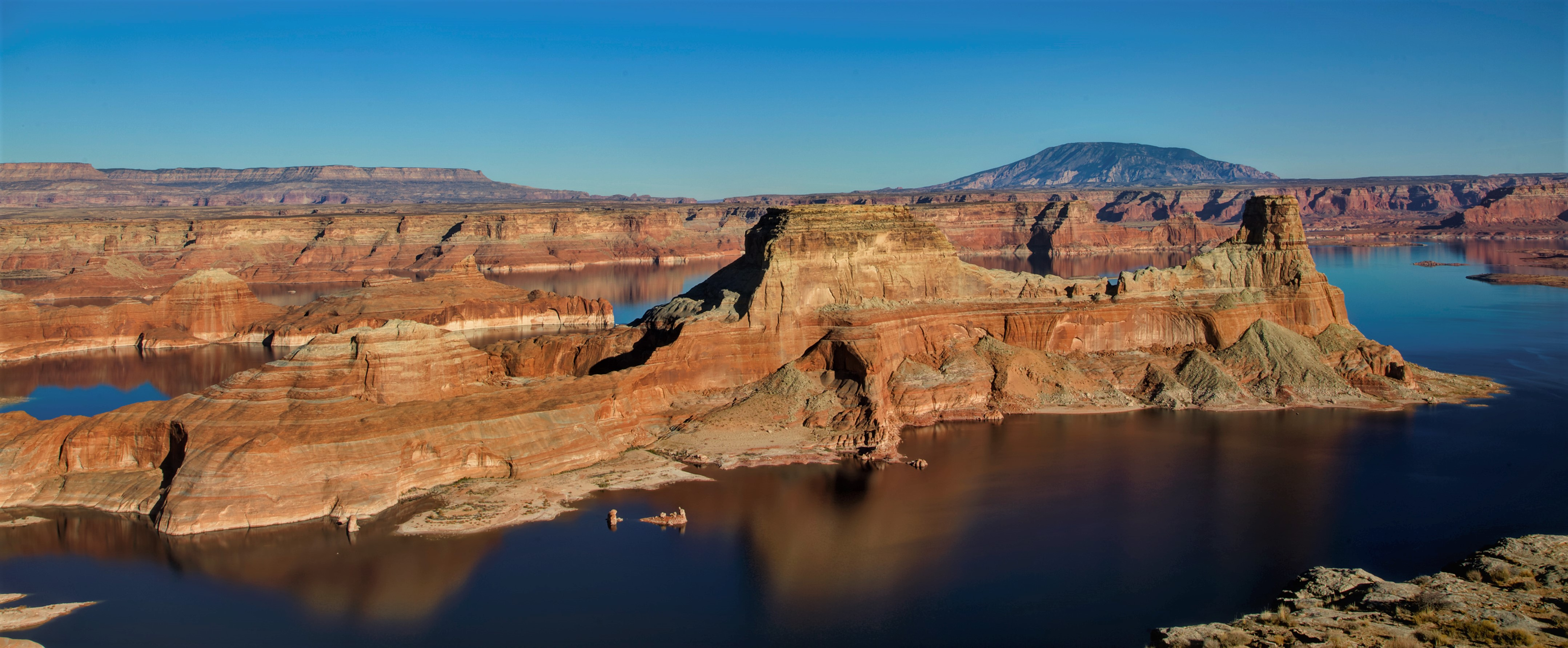
Gunsight Butte seen from the west at Alstrom Point

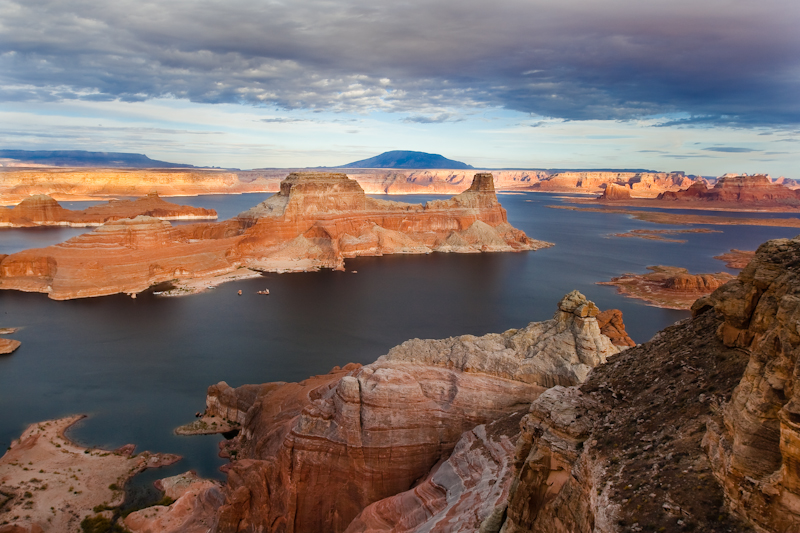
Gunsight Butte seen from Alstrom Point

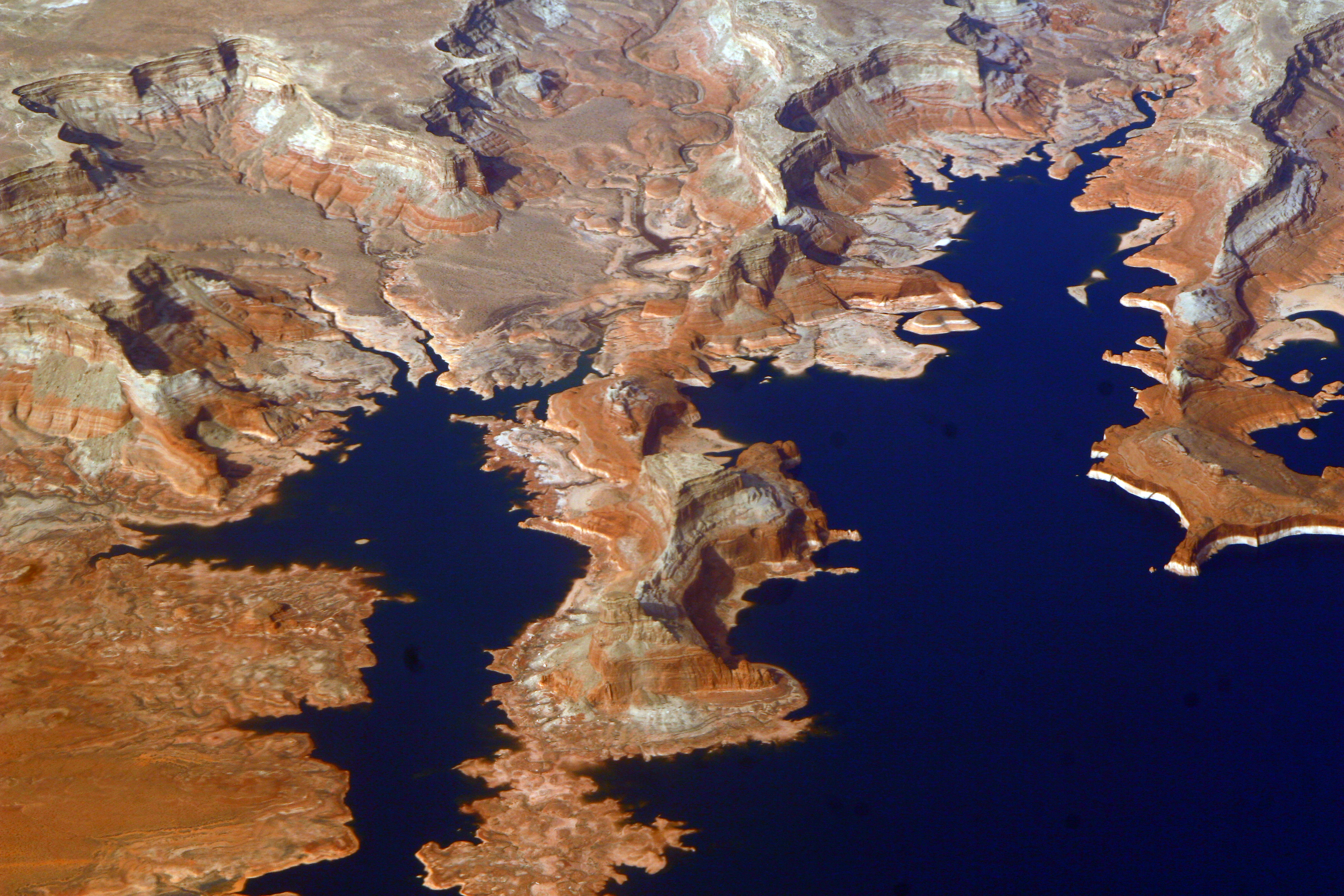
Gunsight Butte centered in lake, Alstrom Point far left

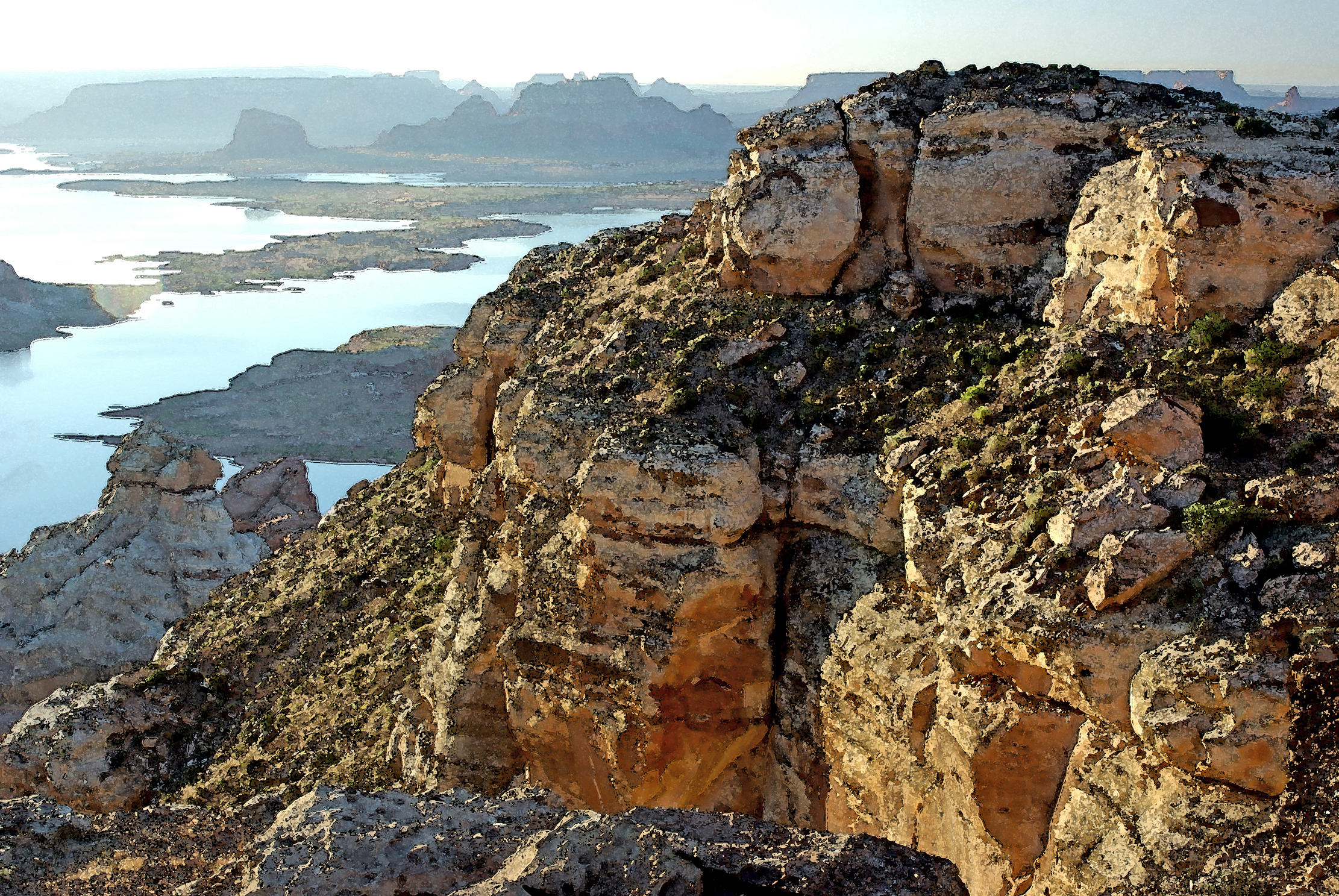

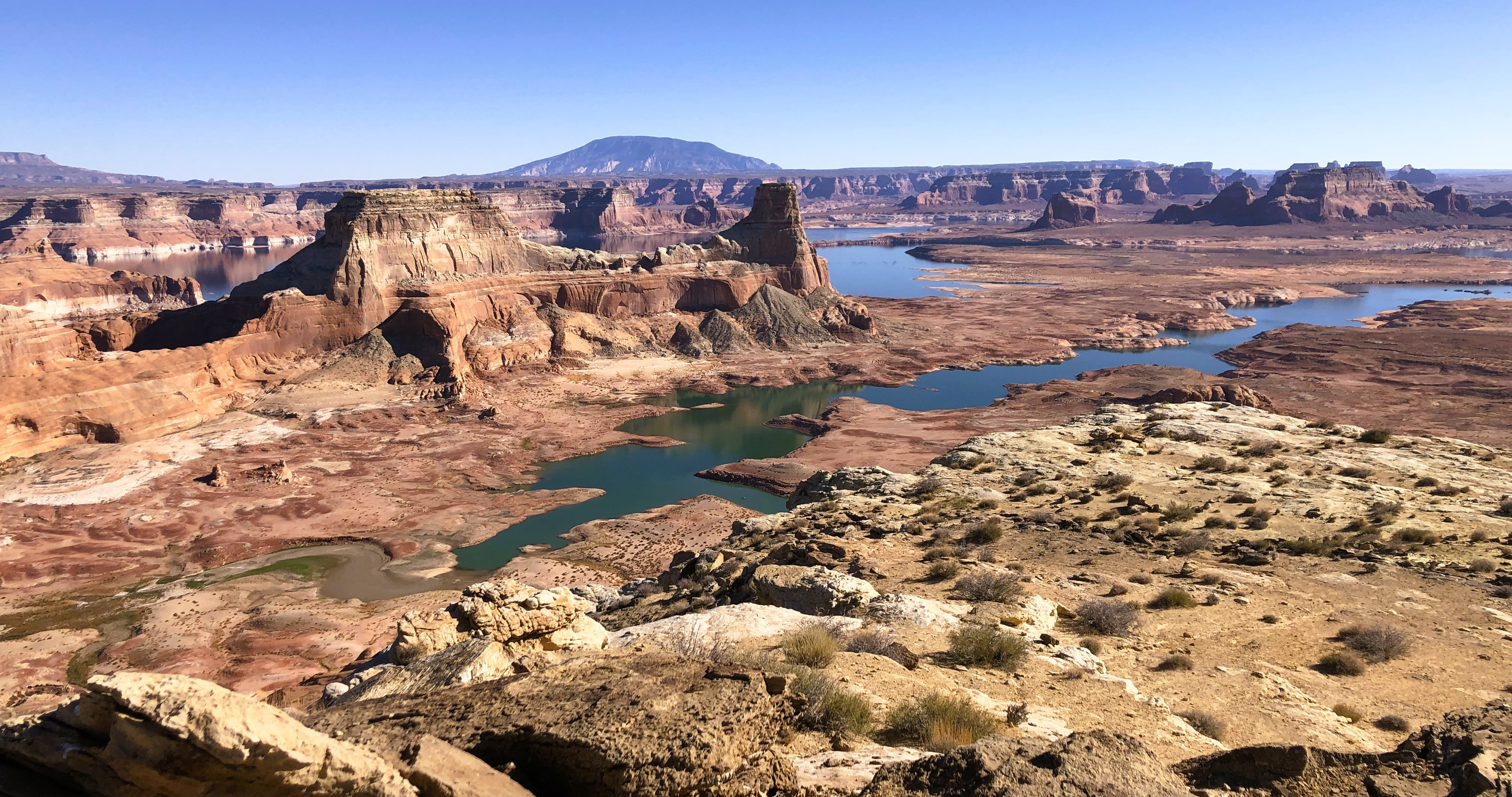
View looking east from Alstrom Point
