= Ansel Hall Ruin =

Archaeological site in Colorado, United States

- U.S. National Register of Historic Places
- Colorado State Register of Historic Properties
- Location: Dolores County, Colorado
- Nearest city: Cahone, Colorado
- NRHP reference No.: 97001418
- CSRHP No.: 5DL.27
- Added to NRHP: 1997

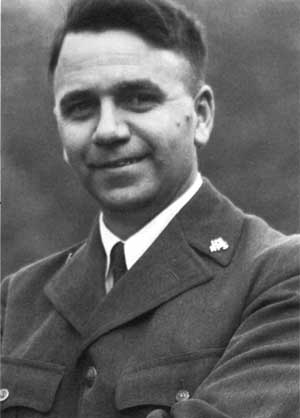
Ansel F. Hall

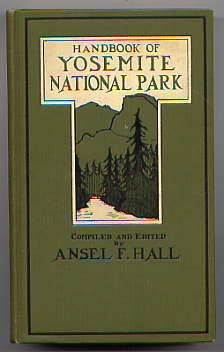
Hall's classic 1921 Yosemite Handbook

The Ansel Hall Ruin, also known as Cahone Ruin, is located in Cahone, Dolores County, Colorado. A pre-historic ruins from the Pueblo II period, the Northern San Juan pueblo was added to the National Register of Historic Places in 1997.

== Ansel Hall ==
The Ansel Hall Ruins, previously called Cahone Ruins, were named for Ansel Hall, the property owner. He sponsored two excavations in 1949 and 1950.

Ansel Franklin Hall was a naturalist for the National Park Service. It's said of him that "probably contributed more than any other individual to the formation and early growth of the interpretive work of the National Park Service (NPS)." He was a mentor to photographer Ansel Adams, formed the non-for-profit concessions organization Mesa Verde Company and in 1933 funded an expedition of Monument Valley to research and record information about the area.

Hall sponsored two excavations in 1949 and 1950.

== Geography ==
The Ansel Hall Ruin is located within the central Mesa Verde Anasazi region that spans southwestern Colorado, southeastern Utah and northern New Mexico. Its boundaries are: the Colorado River in southeastern Utah, the San Juan River in northern New Mexico, and the Piedra River is the easternmost boundary in Colorado.

== History ==
=== Early people ===
Evidence from the Mesa Verde area indicates that there were Paleo-Indians and people of the Archaic period in southwestern Colorado. During the transitional period from a traditional hunter-gatherer society to pueblo people, there were several distinct cultural changes:

==== Early hunters ====
Hunter-gatherers from 10,000 years Before Present hunted and lived in a difficult terrain, traversed deep canyons and areas of few animals and limited vegetation, and managed limited access to water - which made life difficult and limited the size of their hunt groups. They were adaptive to find sufficient food, supplementing their diet with nuts, seeds and fruit from wild plants. Artifacts were found firstly of Paleo-Indians who camped and hunted along the nearby Cajon Mesa of Hovenweep as early as 8,000 years ago and secondly from 20 sites with evidence of the Archaic people from about 6,000 BC.

==== Basketmakers AD 1 to 550 ====
The people living in the Four Corners region were introduced to maize and basketry through Mesoamerican trading about 2,000 years Before Present. Able to have greater control of their diet through cultivation, the hunter-gatherers lifestyle became more sedentary as small disperse groups began cultivating maize and squash. They also continued to hunt and gather wild plants.

They were named "Basketmakers" for their skill in making baskets for storing food, covering with pitch to heat water, and using to toast seeds and nuts. They wove bags, sandals, belts out of yucca plants and leaves - and strung beads. They occasionally lived in dry caves where they dug pits and lined with stones to store food. These people were ancestors of the pueblo people of the Hovenweep pueblo settlement and Mesa Verde.

==== Modified Basketmakers AD 550 to 750 ====
The next era, Modified Basketmakers, resulted in the introduction of pottery which reduced the number of baskets that they made and eliminated the creation of woven bags. The simple, gray pottery allowed them a better tool for cooking and storage. Beans were added to the cultivated diet. Bows and arrows made hunting easier and thus the acquisition of hides for clothing. Turkey feathers were woven into blankets and robes. On the rim of Mesa Verde, small groups built pit houses which were built several feet below the surface with elements suggestive of the introduction of celebration rituals.

==== Pueblo I - AD 750 to 900 ====
From pueblos at Mesa Verde we learn of some advancements during this period which are reflected in the Hovenweep structures built in the next cultural period. Pueblo buildings were built with stone, windows facing south, and in U, E and L shapes. The buildings were located more closely together and reflected deepening religious celebration. Towers were built near kivas and likely used for look-outs. Pottery became more versatile, not just for cooking, but now included pitchers, ladles, bowls, jars and dishware for food and drink. White pottery with black designs emerged, the pigments coming from plants. Water management and conservation techniques, including the use of reservoirs and silt-retaining dams also emerged during this period.

Midway through this period, about AD 900, the number of Hovenweep residential sites increased.

=== Pueblo II - AD 900-1150 ===
Map of Ancient Pueblo People (Anasazi) regions, including the northern Mesa Verde region and the southern Chaco Canyon region.

Colorado Historical Society, Office of Archaeology and Historic Preservation described the site as:

A loose cluster of individual habitation units surrounding several community structures, is believed to have been built and occupied between AD 1050 and 1150. As one of the few "pure" large Pueblo II sites in Southwestern Colorado, it is important as a representation of the broad patterns of Mesa Verde Anasazi cultural change.

==== Chaco cultural influence ====
At the beginning of the Pueblo II period, there were few people living in the Mesa Verde region, many people having departed the area at the end of Pueblo I. As conditions for farming improved, people returned to the Mesa Verde region and farmed.

Between 1080 and 1130, the Mesa Verde region was heavily influenced by the culture of the Chacoan people from New Mexico.

- Chaco was the center of a large trade network, reaching as far south as Mexico. This dramatically increased access to unique goods, such as Chacoan style pottery, copper bells, macaw remains, sea shells and raw materials used to create artifacts. In addition to the integration of new goods into their culture, the extensive trade routes also brought new ideas and people to the region.
- The Chaco culture had a unique architecture, "great houses" which were large, multi-storied and multi-room complexes, with great kivas located inside the structure. More than 225 great houses have been found in the northern Anasazi regions, including the Mesa Verde region. Great houses built outside of Chaco Canyon were called "outliers," connected back to Chaco Canyon through a network of roads.

Until this time, most of the people lived in disperse communities of small farmsteads, clustered around community centers which included large buildings for meetings and ceremonies and great kivas. There also appeared to have been storage areas for harvested crops. The Chacoan cultural influence was reflected in "great houses" that began appearing in Mesa Verde region communities starting about 1080, and lasting until 1140 after which point great houses were no longer built in Mesa Verde region settlements. A 50-year drought lasted from 1130 to 1180.

==== Greenlee site, near Dove Creek ====
Greenlee Ruins on Squaw Point, about 8 miles west of the town of Cahone was built at least by the early Pueblo II period, and possibly as early as Pueblo I. Prior to the construction of the Ansel Hall pueblo, the Greenlee site was abandoned about 1050, when Ansel Hall and Brewer Mesa pueblos were in their early stages.

==== Ansel Hall site ====
With specific reference to archaeological findings at the Ansel Hall site, the community had a great kiva and a number of ruins which may indicate that the pueblo village was at least a moderate-sized community. Ansel Hall site had about 200 rooms and 36 kivas.

At least one of the small sites was built late in the 11th century, about AD 1074. The pueblo village may have been abandoned by AD 1100, based upon the absence of 12th century white and black pottery.

The nature of artifacts found indicate that the Ansel Hall residents had connections with the Chaco Canyon center, traded with other native people and had a similar lifestyle with their neighbors:

- Tools and flakes made of Obsidian glass, possibly from an area east of Pagosa Springs in the southern San Juan Mountains or New Mexico, were found in Cahone, Yellow Jacket, James A. Lancaster Site and Stevenson sites. These findings bolster claims of trading among the Ancient Pueblo People.
- An arrow point, Pueblo Alto Side Notched point, common to Chaco Canyon was found in outlying Mesa Verde region communities, including Ansel Hall Ruins, Lowry Pueblo, the Mug House at Mesa Verde, and other southwestern Colorado site. It was used in the Pueblo II and Pueblo III eras. The point was named for the Chaco Canyon great house, Pueblo Alto.
- Similar to a Chaco Corner Notched point, the Bonito Point used in the Pueblo II and Pueblo III periods was found throughout the Mesa Verde region in Colorado, including Ansel Hall Ruin, Lowry Pueblo, sites on Chapin and Wetherill Mesas in Mesa Verde, and the La Plata district. The arrow point was named for the Bonita Pueblo in Chaco Canyon.
- Indigenous to the Ansel Hall Ruins area, the Dolores Straight Stem point, named for the Dolores River Valley, was found at Ansel Hall, Ackmen-Lowry area, Durango and Piedra districts of southwestern Colorado. The point was generally used between about AD 729 and 920.

The Wilderness Trust Fund requested a grant of $44,900 for the Ansel Hall Ruin (site 5DL.27) in 1999.

The ownership of the ruin may pass from a private owner to the Bureau of Land Management.

=== Pueblo III - AD 1150-1300 ===
Rohn and Ferguson, authors of Puebloan ruins of the Southwest, state that the ruin was also a Pueblo III settlement. During the Pueblo III period there was a significant community change. Moving in from dispersed farmsteads into community centers at pueblos canyon heads or cliff dwellings on canyon shelves. Population peaked between 1200 and 1250 to more than 20,000 in the Mesa Verde region.

By 1300 Ancient Pueblo People abandoned their settlements, as the result of climate changes and food shortage, and south to villages in Arizona and New Mexico.

== Collection ==
Artifacts from the Ansel Hall Ruin site are located at the Anasazi Heritage Center by December 12, 2000. The collection was previously located at the Mesa Verde National Park.

== See also ==
Other neighboring Ancient Pueblo sites in Colorado

- Anasazi Heritage Center
- Canyons of the Ancients National Monument
- Crow Canyon Archaeological Center
- Hovenweep National Monument
- Mesa Verde National Park

Other cultures in the Four Corners region

- Trail of the Ancients
- List of ancient dwellings of Pueblo peoples

Early American cultures

- Ancestral Puebloans
- Oasisamerica cultures
- Paleo-Indians
