= Crossing of the Fathers =

Historical river crossing of the Colorado River in Utah

Coordinates: 37°02′56″N 111°18′14″W

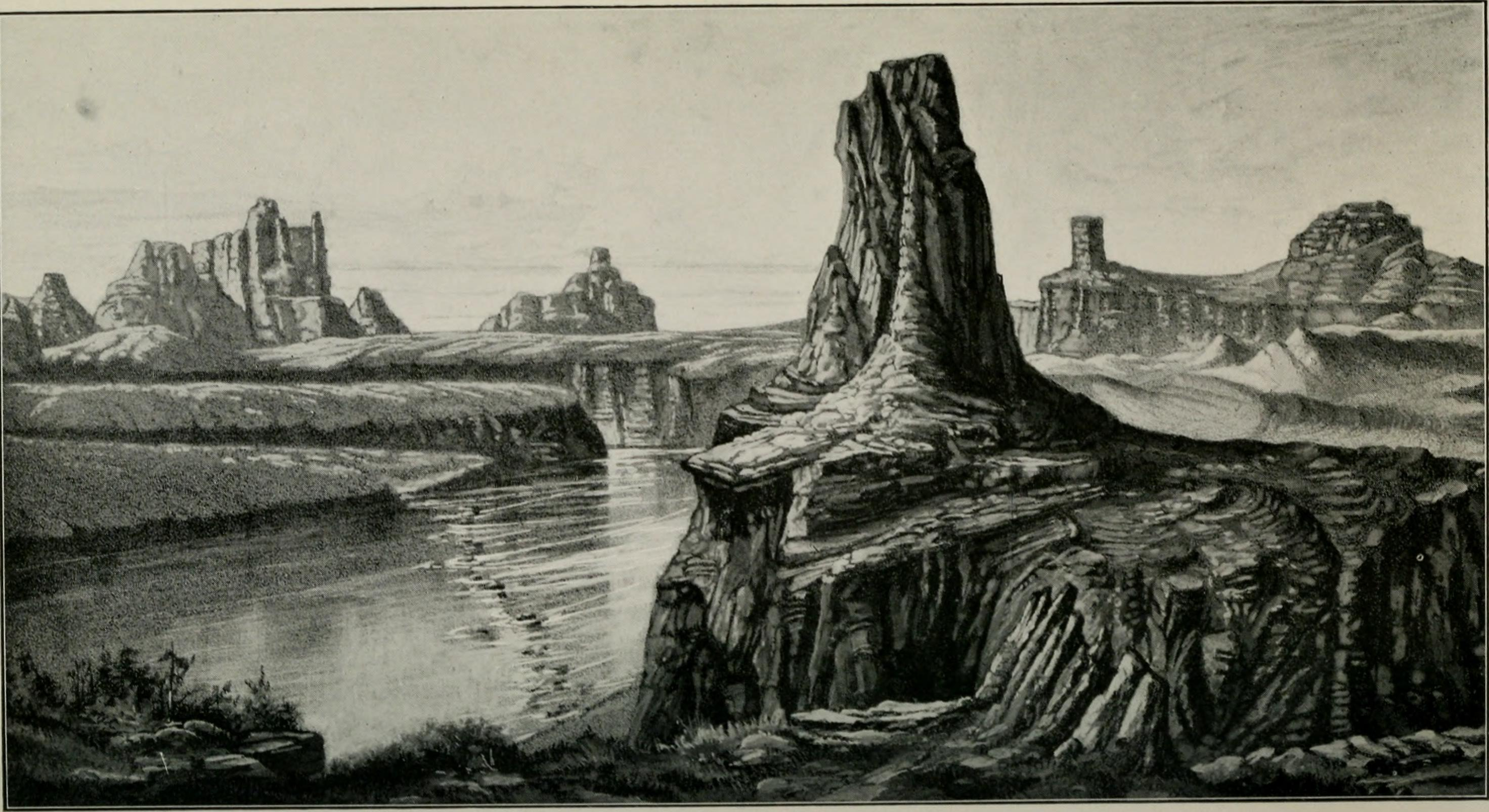
Engraving showing the location of the Crossing of the Fathers

Crossing of the Fathers is a historical river crossing of the Colorado River, in Kane and San Juan Counties, Utah. The crossing, at an elevation of approximately 3,180 feet (970 m), was a series of sand bars at a great bend in the river located a mile west of Padres Butte, which is now at the tip of Padre Point on the south shore of Lake Powell. After the completion of Glen Canyon Dam in 1966, the crossing, along with the historical banks of the river itself, was submerged beneath nearly 400 feet (120 m) of water in Padre Bay on Lake Powell.

The Crossing of the Fathers is named for the Spanish Franciscan priests or "padres" Atanasio Domínguez and Silvestre Vélez de Escalante, who first reported it during an expedition that forded the Colorado River there in 1776. The Colorado River crossing used by the Armijo Route of the Old Spanish Trail was established in 1828.
