= Cahone, Colorado =

Unincorporated community in Dolores County, CO, USA

- Unincorporated community
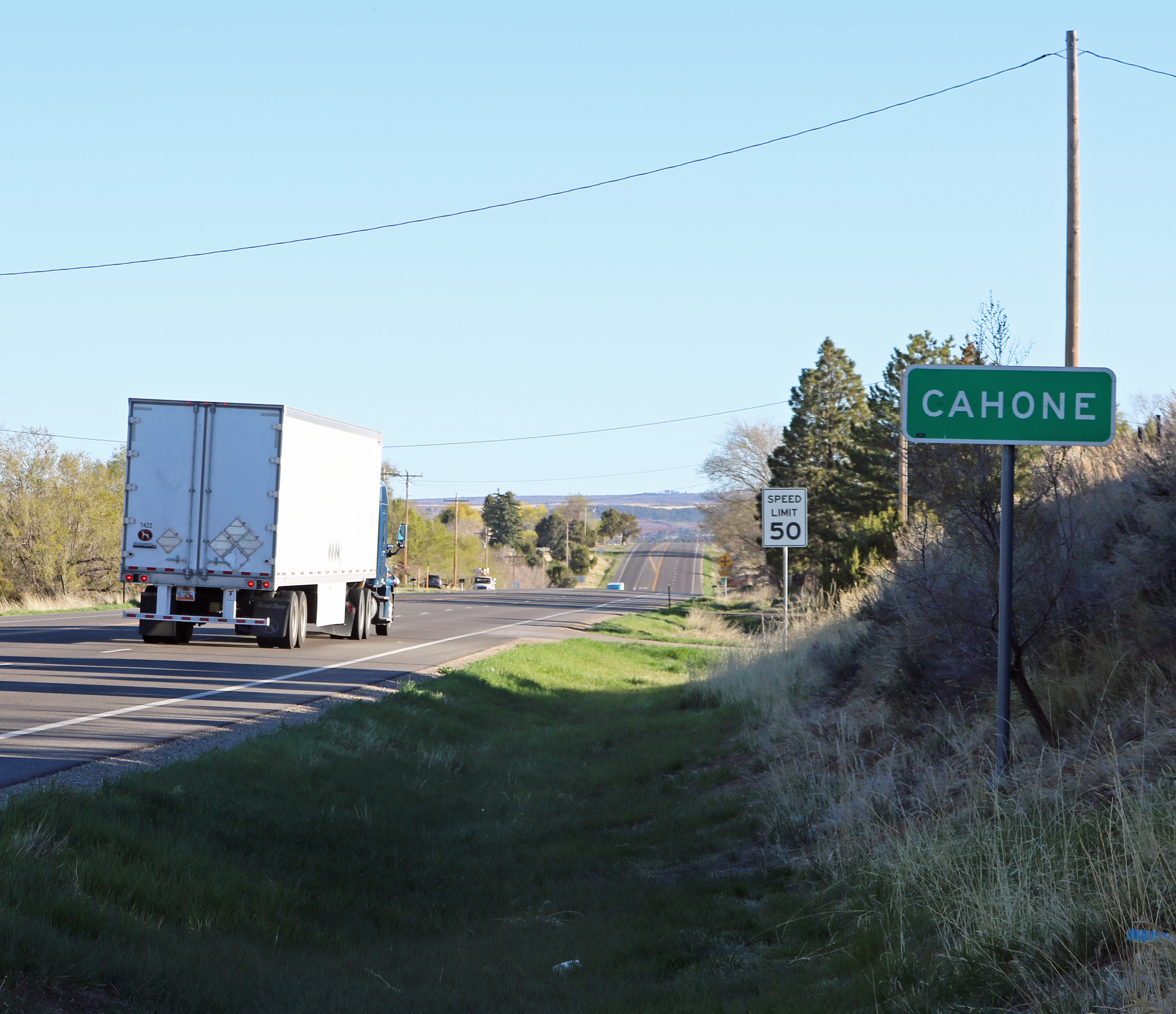
- Entering Cahone from the south on U.S. Highway 491

- Location of Cahone, Colorado. Cahone (Colorado)
- Coordinates: 37°39′32″N 108°48′28″W
- Country: United States
- State: Colorado
- County: Dolores
- Established: Approximately 1912

Government
  - Type: unincorporated community
  - Body: Dolores County
- Elevation: 6,680 ft (2,040 m)
- Time zone: UTC−07:00 (MST)
  - Summer (DST): UTC−06:00 (MDT)
- ZIP code: 81320
- GNIS pop ID: 176613

Cahone is an unincorporated community and U.S. Post Office in Dolores County, Colorado, United States. The ZIP Code of the Cahone Post Office is 81320.

== History ==
The Ansel Hall Ruin, also known as the Cahone Ruin, was a prehistoric North San Juan pueblo from the 1000–1499 AD period which has been listed on the National Register of Historic Places since 1997. The town of Cahone was established about 1912. The town was named by Bert Ballenger, later the town's first postmaster, for a nearby canyon named El Cajón in Spanish, meaning little box. The Cahone Post Office opened on May 21, 1916.

== See also ==
- List of populated places in Colorado
