= Gunsight Butte =

Mountain in Kane County, Utah, United States

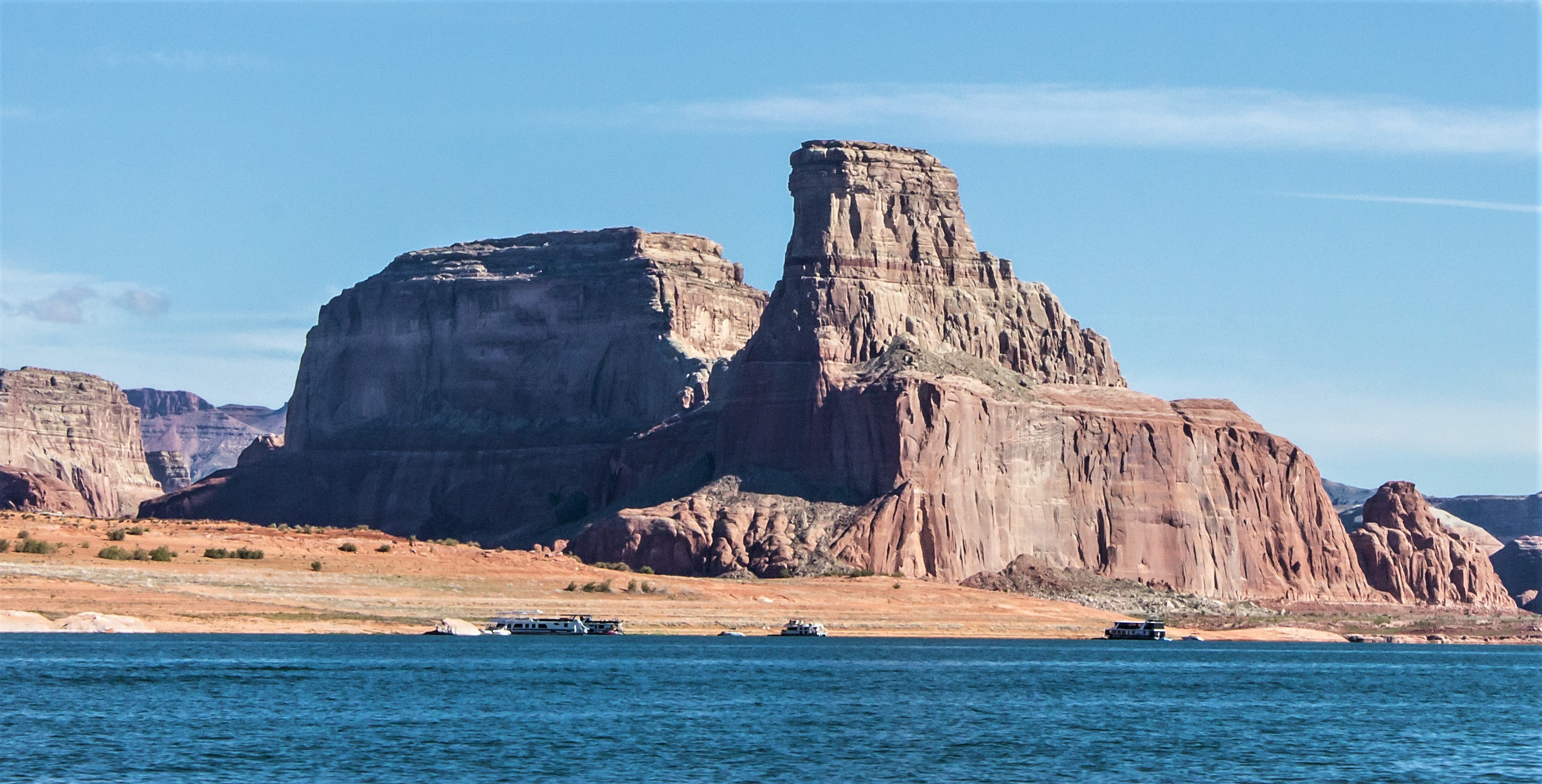
- South aspect

Highest point
- Elevation: 4,678 ft (1,426 m)
- Prominence: 1,018 ft (310 m)
- Parent peak: Romana Mesa
- Isolation: 2.46 mi (3.96 km)
- Coordinates: 37°03′41″N 111°20′08″W

Geography
- Location within Utah Location within the United States
- Location: Glen Canyon National Recreation Area; Kane County, Utah, U.S.
- Parent range: Colorado Plateau
- Topo map: USGS Gunsight Butte

Geology
- Rock age: Jurassic
- Rock type: Entrada Sandstone

Gunsight Butte is a 4,678-foot-elevation (1,426 m) sandstone summit located in Glen Canyon National Recreation Area, in Kane County of southern Utah. It is situated 12 miles (19 km) northeast of the town of Page. Gunsight Butte is an island that towers nearly 1,000 feet (300 m) above Lake Powell when the lake is full. This iconic landmark of the Lake Powell area is a butte composed primarily of Entrada Sandstone, similar to Padres Butte 3 miles (4.8 km) to the east-southeast, and Dominguez Butte 4 miles (6.4 km) to the southeast. The Entrada Sandstone of Gunsight Butte is overlain by Romana Sandstone, and capped by Morrison Formation. The Entrada Sandstone, which was originally deposited as sandy mud on a tidal flat, is believed to have formed about 160 million years ago during the Jurassic period as a giant sand sea, the largest in Earth's history.

According to the Köppen climate classification system, Gunsight Butte is located in an arid climate zone with hot, very dry summers, and chilly winters with very little snow.

== See also ==
- Colorado Plateau
- List of rock formations in the United States

== Gallery ==
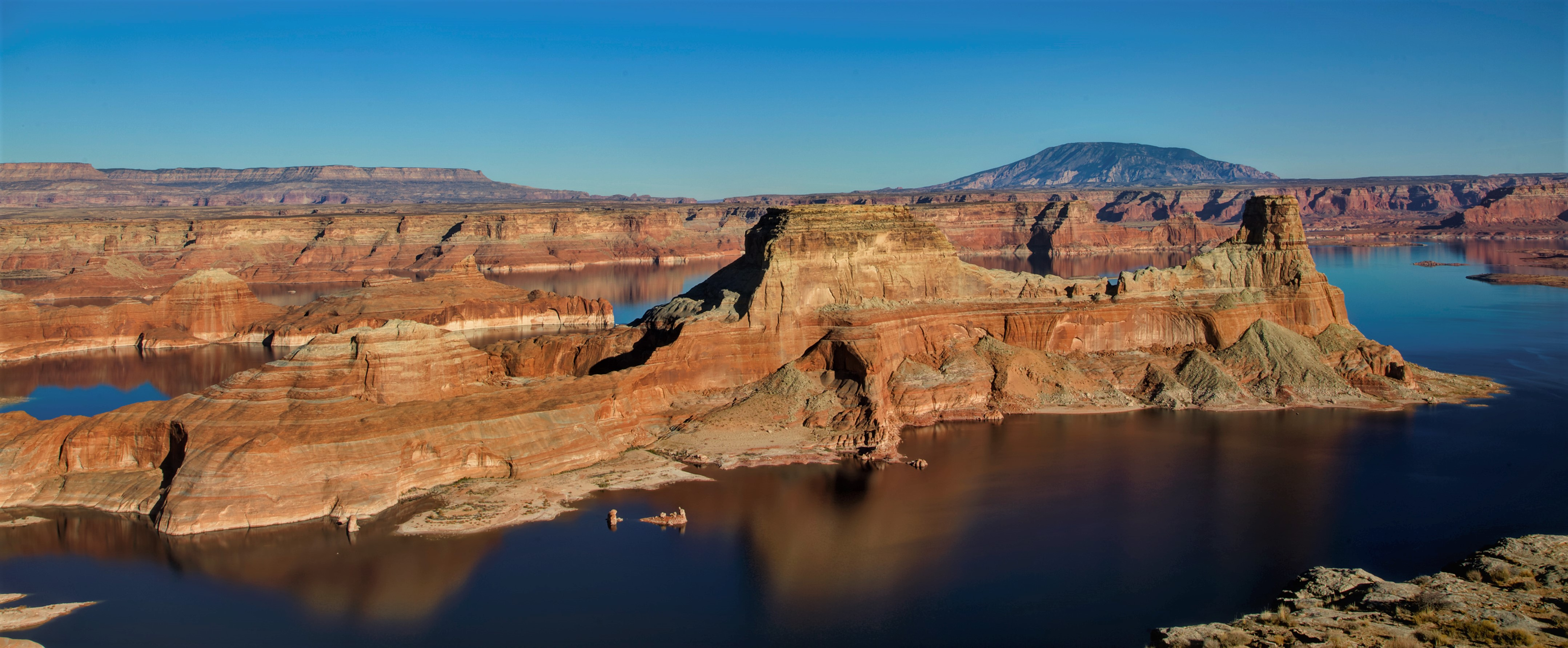
Gunsight Butte seen from the west at Alstrom Point

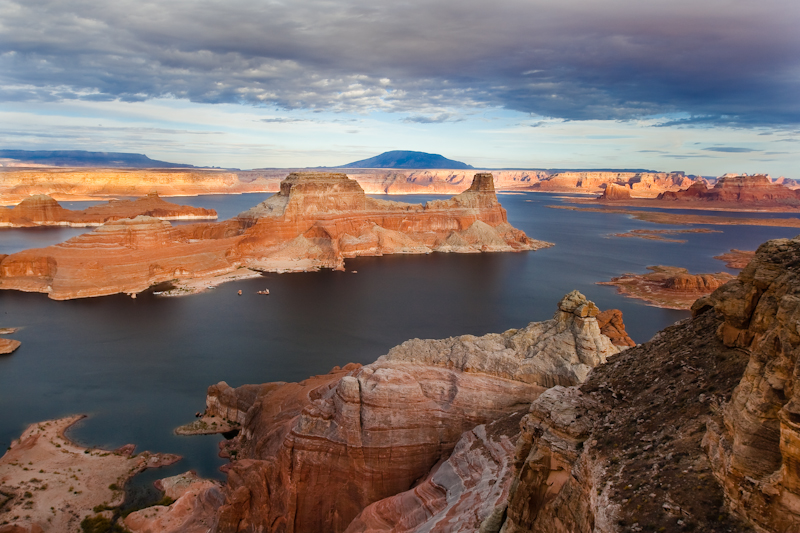
Gunsight Butte seen from Alstrom Point

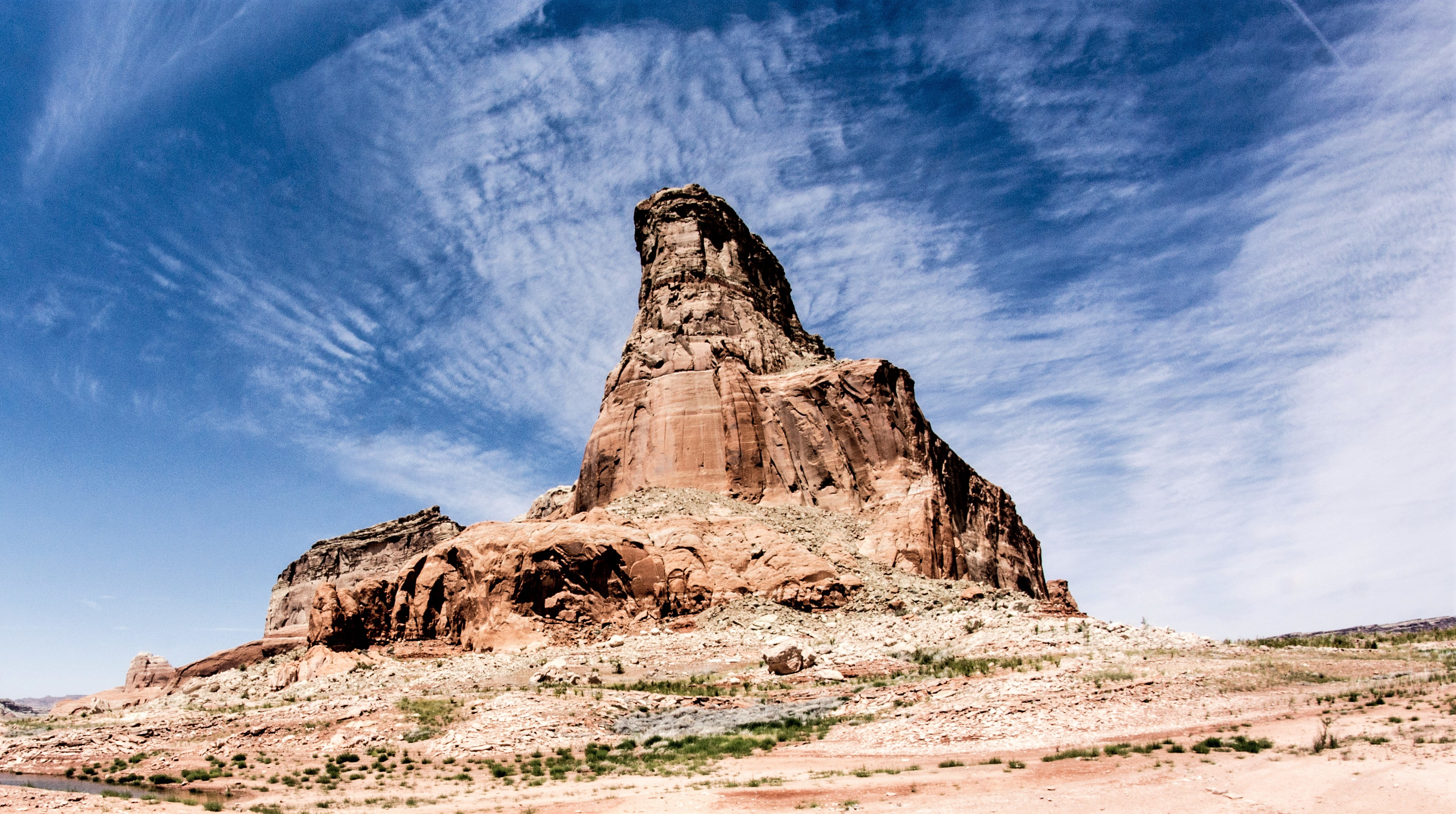
Below the south peak of Gunsight Butte

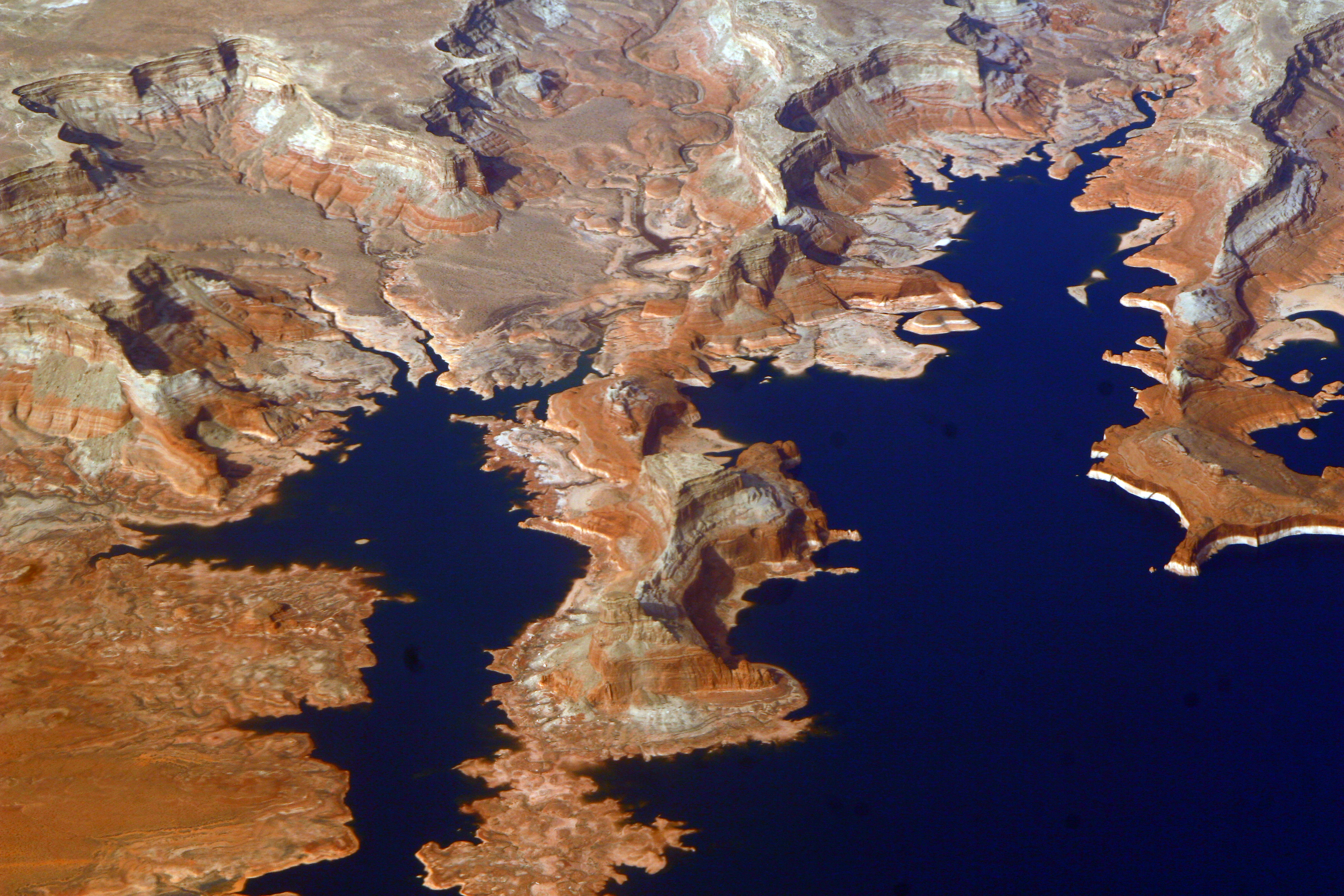
Gunsight Butte centered in lake

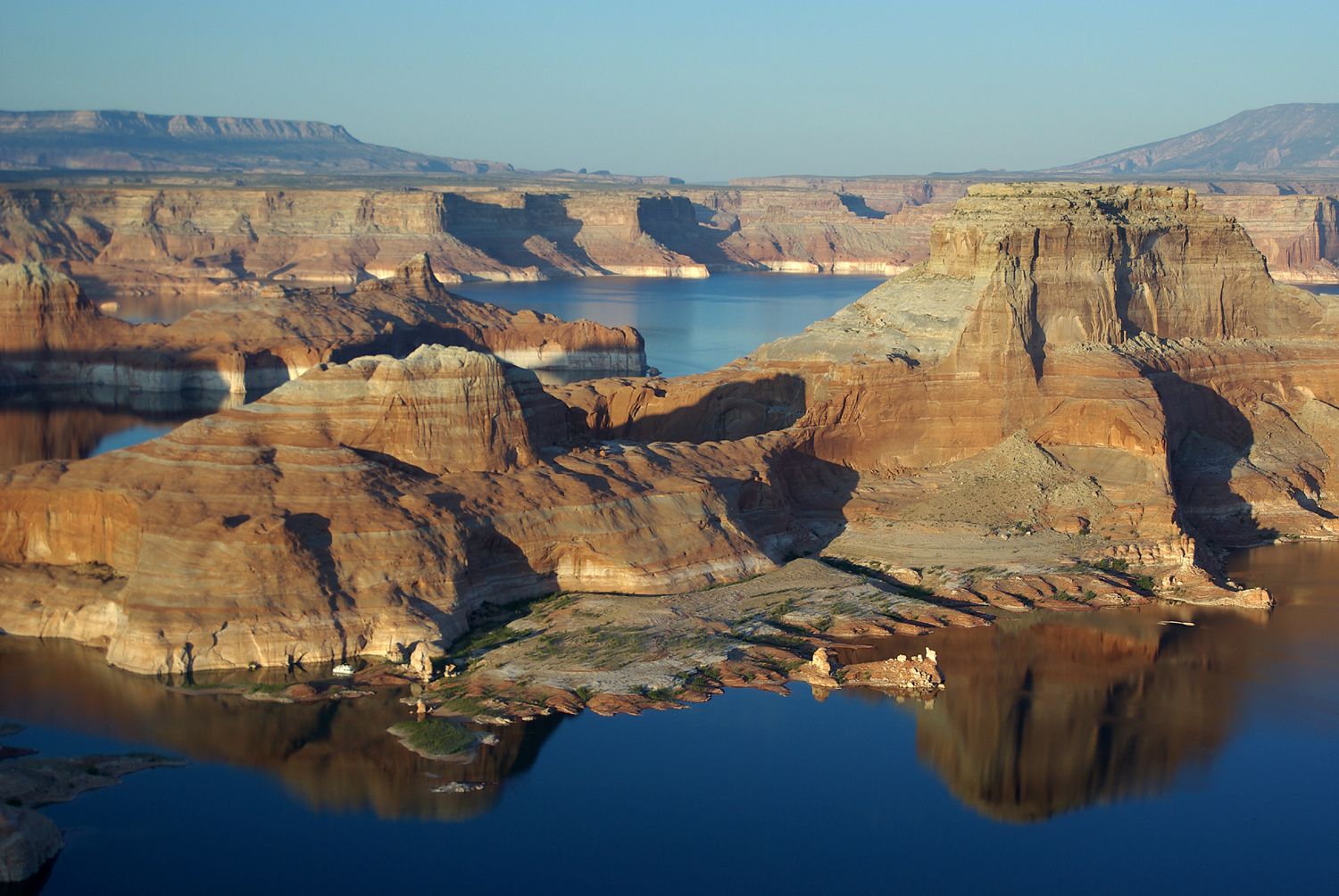

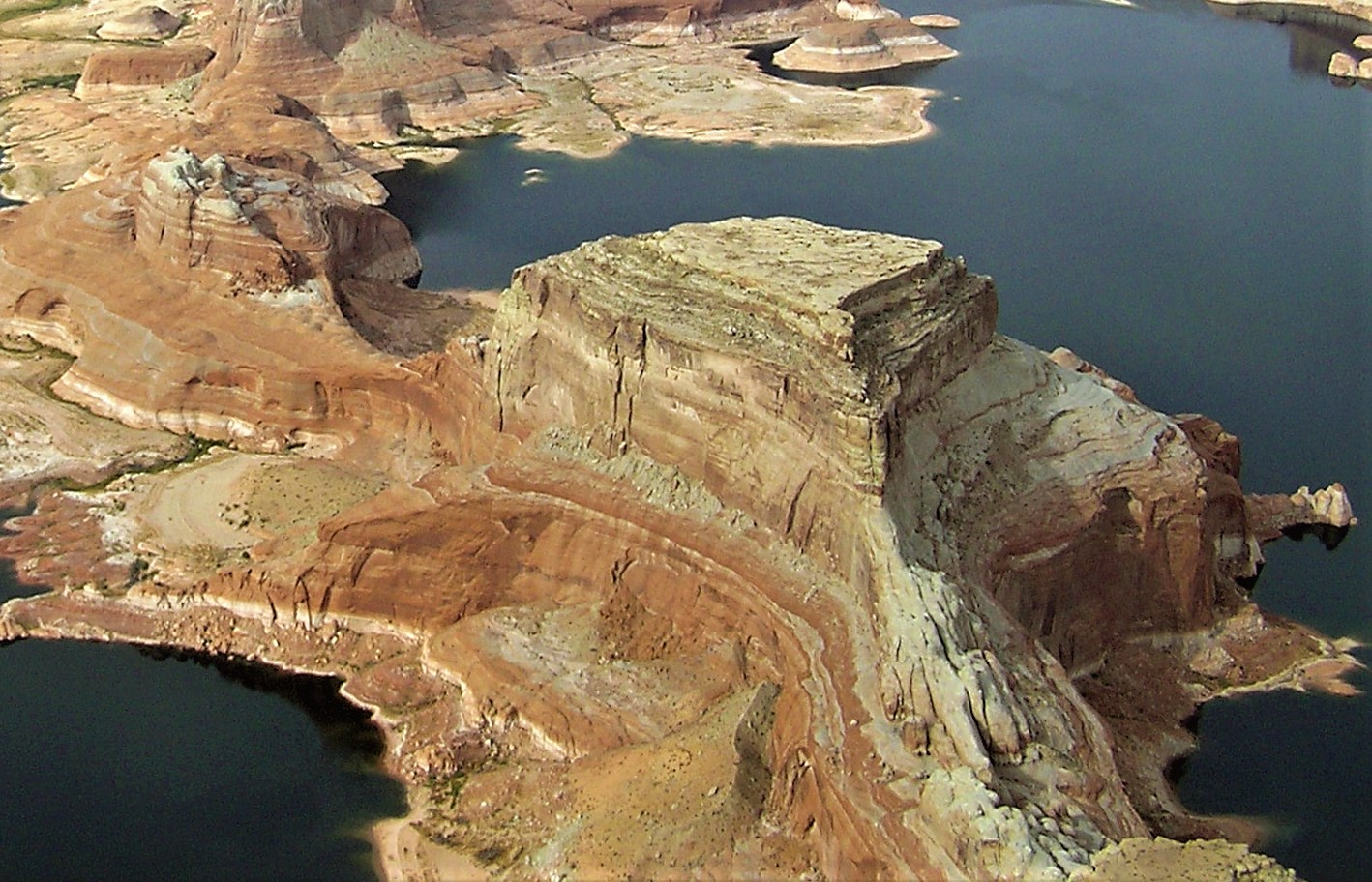

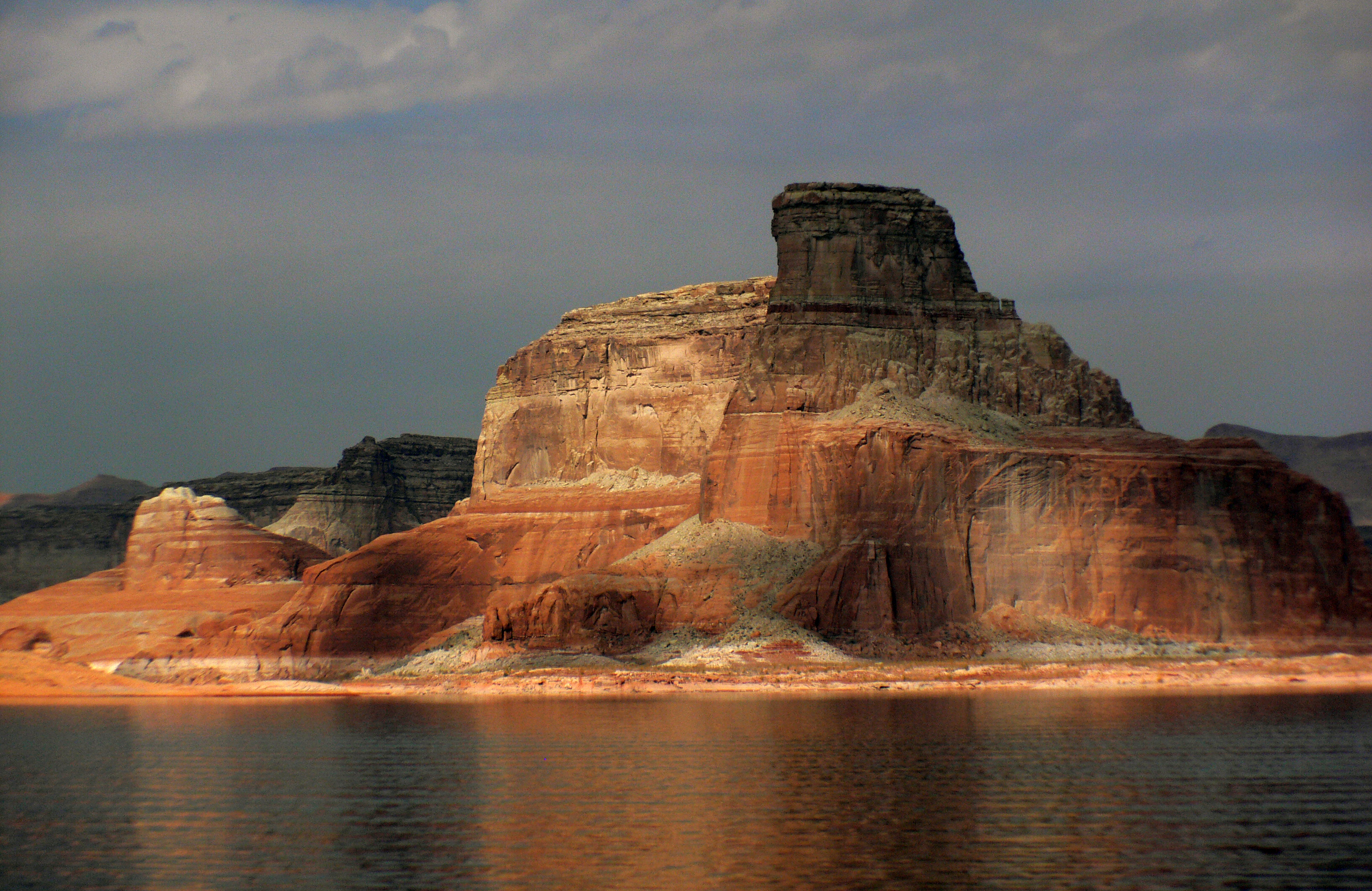

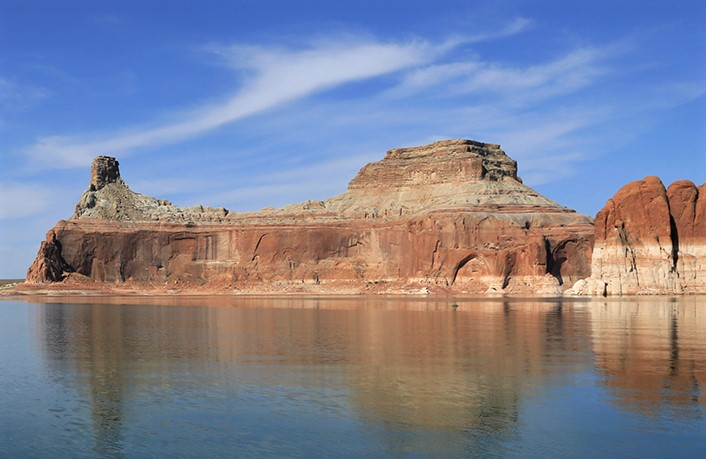
East aspect
