= Square Butte (Arizona) =

Landform in Coconino County, Navajo Nation, Arizona

- Tsé Dikʼání
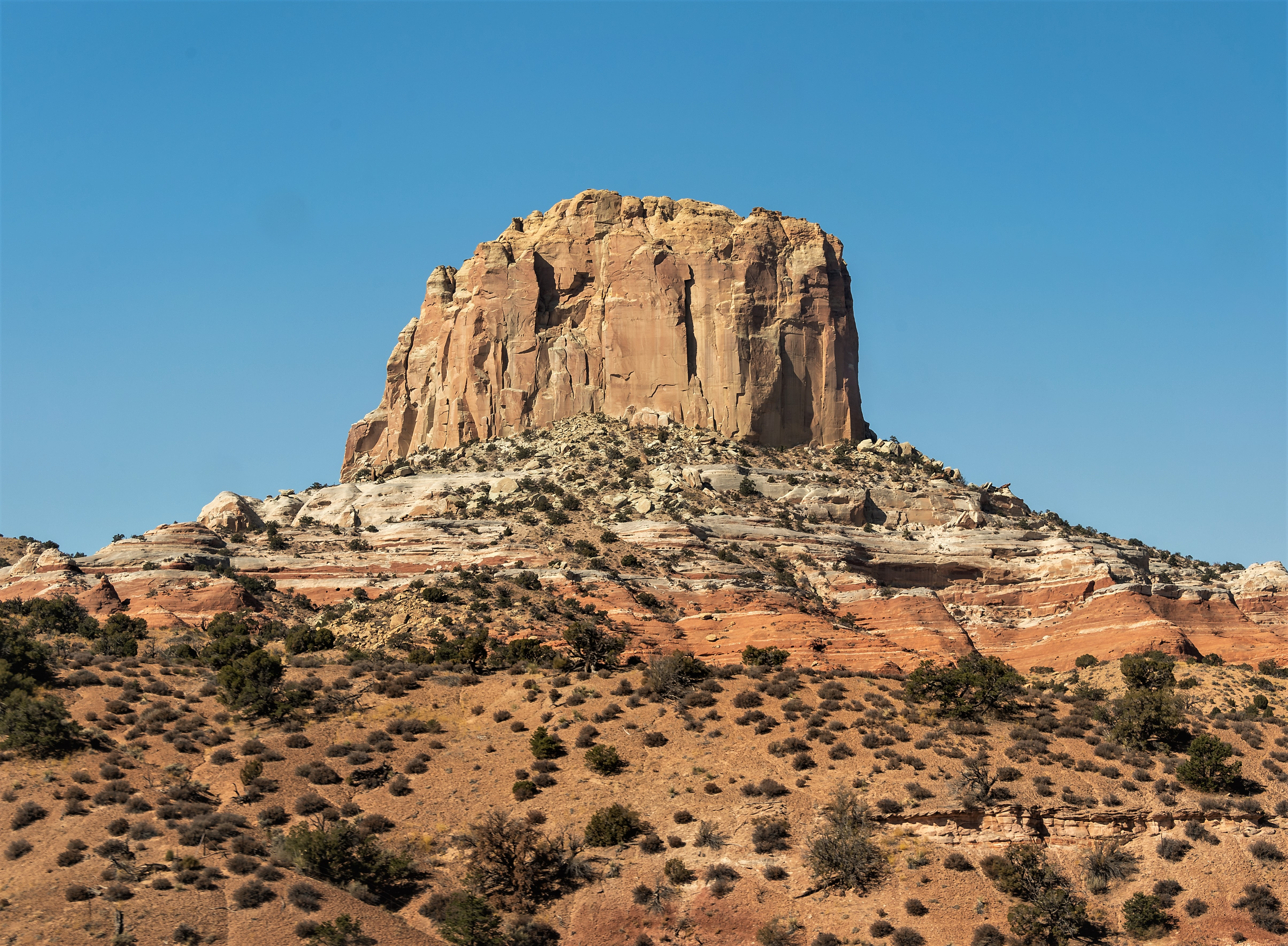
- Southeast aspect

Highest point
- Elevation: 7,140 ft (2,180 m)
- Prominence: 400 ft (120 m)
- Parent peak: White Mesa
- Isolation: 1.76 mi (2.83 km)
- Coordinates: 36°36′16″N 110°55′36″W

Geography
- Location within Arizona Location within the United States
- Location: Navajo Reservation; Coconino County, Arizona, U.S.
- Parent range: Colorado Plateau
- Topo map: USGS Square Butte

Geology
- Rock age: Jurassic
- Rock type: Entrada Sandstone

Square Butte is a 7,140-foot-elevation (2,180 m) sandstone summit located on Navajo Nation land, in Coconino County of northern Arizona. It is situated 35 miles (56 km) southeast of the town of Page, and nine miles (14 km) east of Kaibito, where it towers over 700 feet (210 m) above the surrounding terrain as a landmark alongside Arizona State Route 98. Square Butte is known as Tsé Dikʼání in Navajo language, meaning "square rock." Its nearest higher neighbor is White Mesa, two miles (3.2 km) to the south. Precipitation runoff from Square Butte drains to northwest into Square Butte Wash or northeast into Potato Canyon, then ultimately Lake Powell, all part of the Colorado River drainage basin. According to the Köppen climate classification system, Square Butte is located in an arid climate zone with hot, very dry summers, and chilly winters. Spring and fall are the most favorable seasons to visit. The top of Square Butte is composed of Entrada Sandstone including the Cow Springs Member, and it overlays Carmel Formation, all of which was deposited in the Jurassic period.

== See also ==
- Colorado Plateau
- List of rock formations in the United States

== Gallery ==
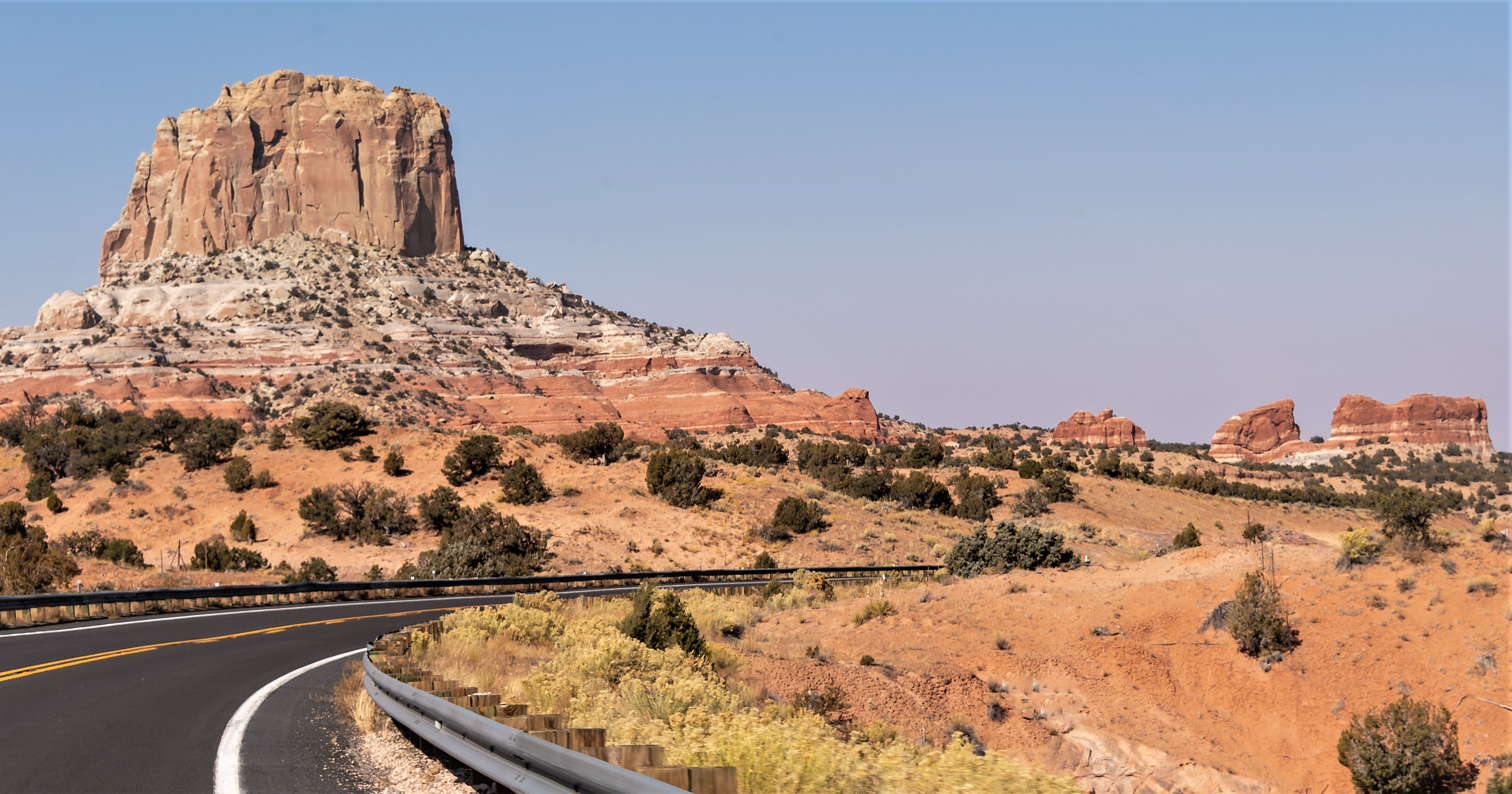
From Highway 98, with Setting Red Rocks to right

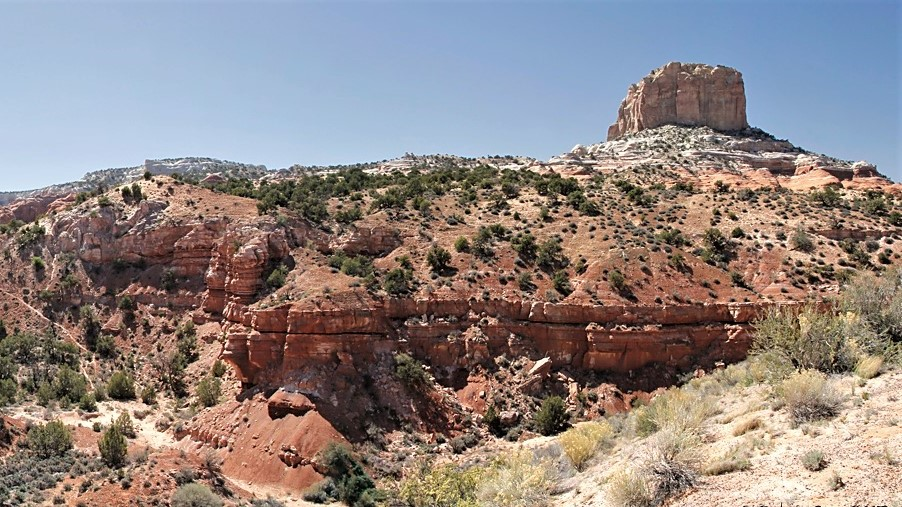
Note exposed Carmel Formation
