= Antelope Canyon =

Landform in the Navajo Nation, Arizona

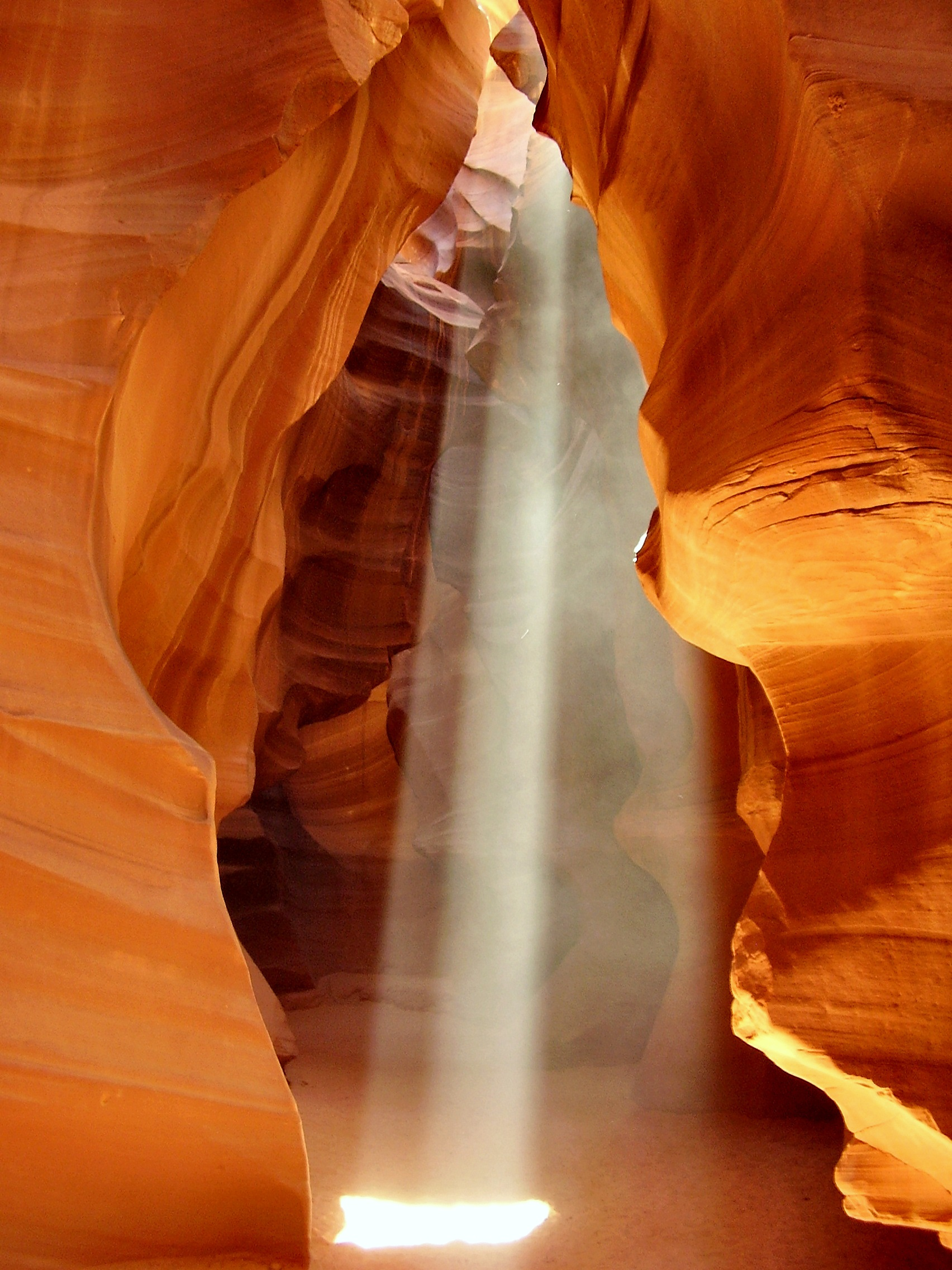
- A beam of light in the weathered Upper Antelope Canyon
- Route of Antelope Creek from the National Hydrography Dataset, which describes Antelope Creek as an intermittent creek. The top marker denotes the location of the entrance to Lower Antelope Canyon and the bottom marker denotes the location of the entrance to Upper Antelope Canyon
- Floor elevation: 3,704 ft (1,129 m)
- Length: Upper Antelope Canyon: about 660 feet (200 m); Lower Antelope Canyon: about 1,335 feet (407 m)
- Depth: about 120 feet (37 m)

Naming
- Native name: Tsé Bighánílíní (Navajo)

Geology
- Type: Sandstone slot canyon
- Age: 8-60 million years

Geography
- Location: Navajo Nation, Coconino County, near Lechee, Arizona
- Population centers: Page
- Coordinates: 36°51′43″N 111°22′28″W
- Topo map: USGS Page

Navajo Upper Antelope Canyon is a slot canyon in the American Southwest, on Navajo land east of Lechee, Arizona. It includes six separate, scenic slot canyon sections on the Navajo Reservation, referred to as Upper Antelope Canyon (or The Crack), Rattle Snake Canyon, Owl Canyon, Mountain Sheep Canyon, Canyon X and Lower Antelope Canyon (or The Corkscrew). It is the primary attraction of Lake Powell Navajo Tribal Park, along with a hiking trail to Rainbow Bridge National Monument.

== Geology ==
Antelope Canyon was formed by the erosion of Navajo Sandstone due to flash flooding and other sub-aerial processes. Rainwater, especially during monsoon season, runs into the extensive basin above the slot canyon sections, picking up speed and sand as it rushes into the narrow passageways. Over time the passageways eroded away, deepening the corridors and smoothing hard edges to form characteristic "flowing" shapes.

== Tourism and sightseeing ==
Photography within the canyons is difficult due to the wide exposure range (often 10 EV or more) made by light reflecting off the canyon walls.

=== Lower Antelope Canyon ===
Even following the installation of stairways, it is a more difficult hike than Upper Antelope. It is longer and narrower in places, and even footing is not available in all areas. Five flights of stairs of varying widths are currently available to aid in descent and ascent. At the end, the climb out requires flights of stairs. Additionally, sand continually falls from the crack above and can make the stairs slippery.

=== Flooded Antelope Canyon ===
Below the Lower Canyon described above, the canyon floor descends beneath the water, making it accessible by kayak, paddleboard and small motor boats. Depending on water levels kayakers can paddle about 1 to 2 miles into the canyon (as of 2024), then beach their kayak and explore by foot.

== Flash flooding ==
Antelope Canyon is visited exclusively through guided tours, in part because rains during summer season can quickly flood it. Rain does not have to fall on or near the Antelope Canyon slots for flash floods to whip through; rain falling dozens of miles away can funnel into them with little notice.

On August 12, 1997, eleven tourists, including seven from France, one from the United Kingdom, one from Sweden and two from the United States, were killed in Lower Antelope Canyon by a flash flood. Very little rain fell at the site that day, but an earlier thunderstorm dumped a large amount of water into the canyon basin 7 miles (11 km) upstream. At the time, the ladder system consisted of amateur-built wood ladders that were swept away by the flood. Today, ladder systems have been bolted in place, and deployable cargo nets are installed at the top of the canyon. A NOAA Weather Radio from the National Weather Service and an alarm horn are on hand at the fee booth.

Despite improved warning and safety systems, the risk of injury from flash floods still exists. On July 30, 2010, several tourists were stranded on a ledge when two flash floods occurred at Upper Antelope Canyon. Some of them were rescued and some had to wait for the flood waters to recede. There were reports that a woman and her nine-year-old son were injured as they were washed away downstream, but no fatalities were reported.
