= Slot canyon =

Long, narrow canyon with steep walls

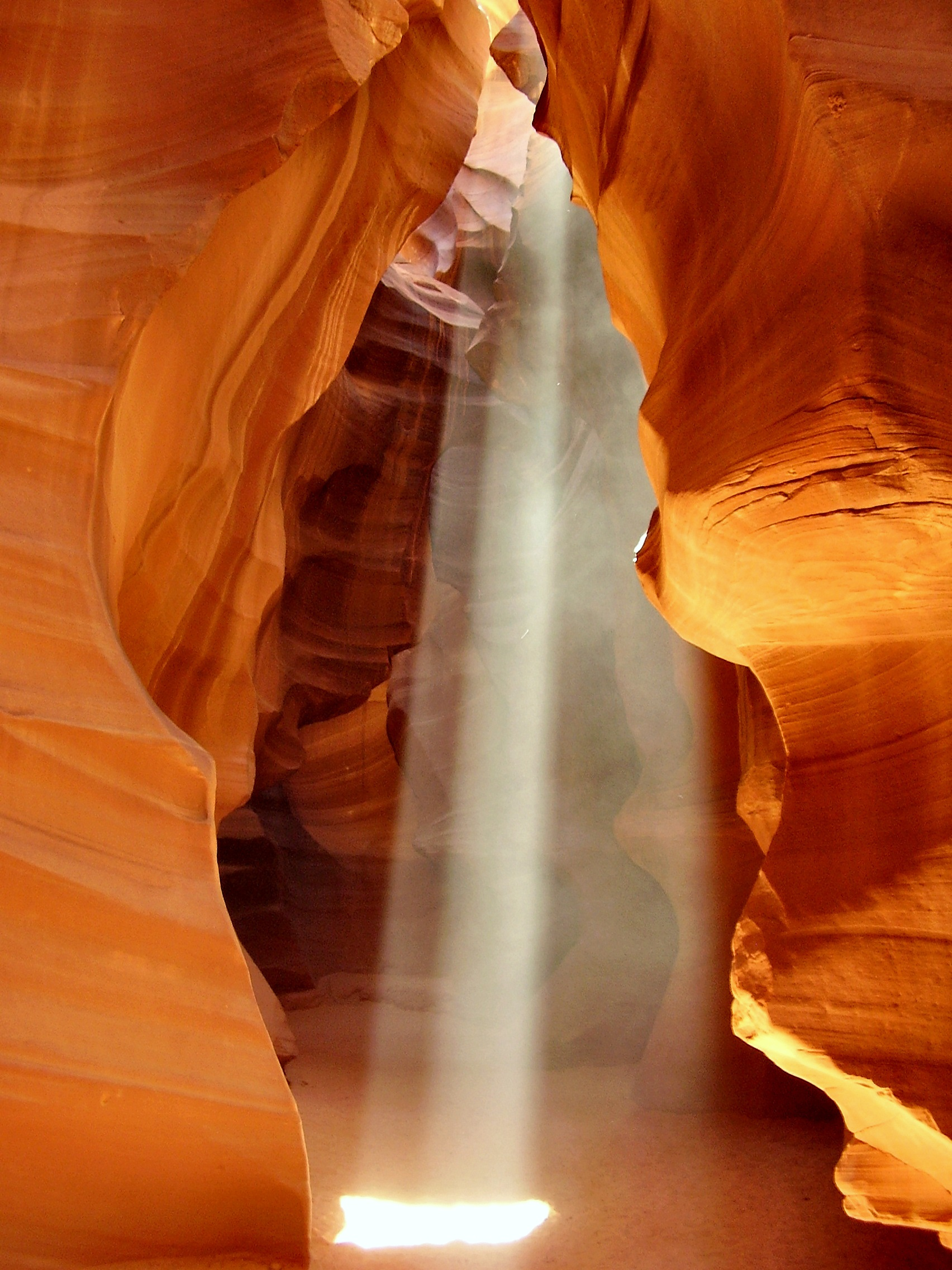
A sunbeam in Upper Antelope Canyon

A slot canyon is a long, narrow channel or drainageway with sheer rock walls that are typically eroded into either sandstone or other sedimentary rock. A slot canyon has depth-to-width ratios that typically exceed 10:1 over most of its length and can approach 100:1. The term is especially used in the semiarid southwestern United States and particularly the Colorado Plateau. Slot canyons are subject to flash flooding and commonly contain unique ecological communities that are distinct from the adjacent, drier uplands. Some slot canyons can measure less than 1 metre (3 ft) across at the top but drop more than 30 metres (100 ft) to the floor of the canyon.

Many slot canyons are formed in sandstone and limestone rock, although slot canyons in other rock types such as granite and basalt are possible. Even in sandstone and limestone, only a very small number of streams will form slot canyons due to a combination of the particular characteristics of the rock and regional rainfall.

== Around the world ==
Slot canyons are found in many parts of the world, predominantly in areas with low rainfall. Some of the best-known slot canyons are to be found in the Southwestern United States. Other significant areas include the Sierra de Guara in northern Spain, the Pyrenees on the border of France and Spain, and the Blue Mountains in New South Wales, Australia.

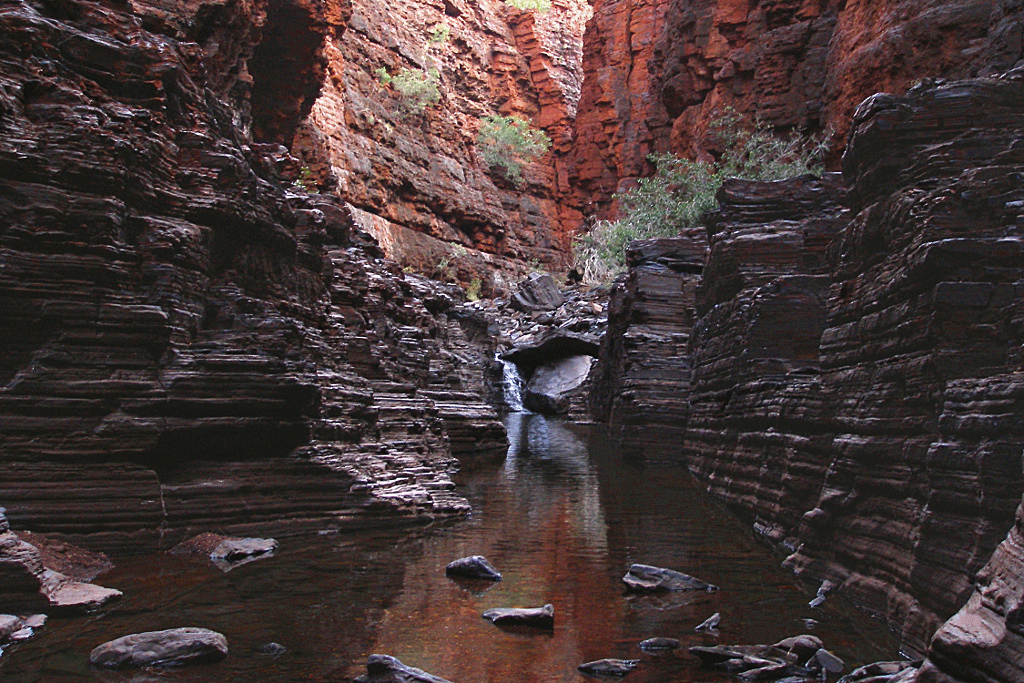
Knox Gorge, Karijini National Park

=== Australia ===
The largest known area of slot canyons in Australia (containing over 900) is in the Blue Mountains, west of Sydney. They occur in a narrow band of sandstone that runs roughly 30 kilometres (19 mi) from east to west, and about 100 kilometres (62 mi) from south to north. The majority of these canyons are in the Wollemi Wilderness, and are difficult to access. Many canyons within the Wollemi Wilderness have yet to be explored by humans. A small number are regularly visited by canyoners on weekends in summer with those closest to Katoomba being the most frequently visited. The Grand Canyon, near Blackheath, has a tourist track along its rim, but requires abseiling (rappelling) or swimming to visit fully.

Sandstone slot canyons can also be found in a few more remote parts of Australia, including Karijini National Park and the Bungle Bungles in Purnululu National Park, both in Western Australia, and Carnarvon Gorge in Queensland.

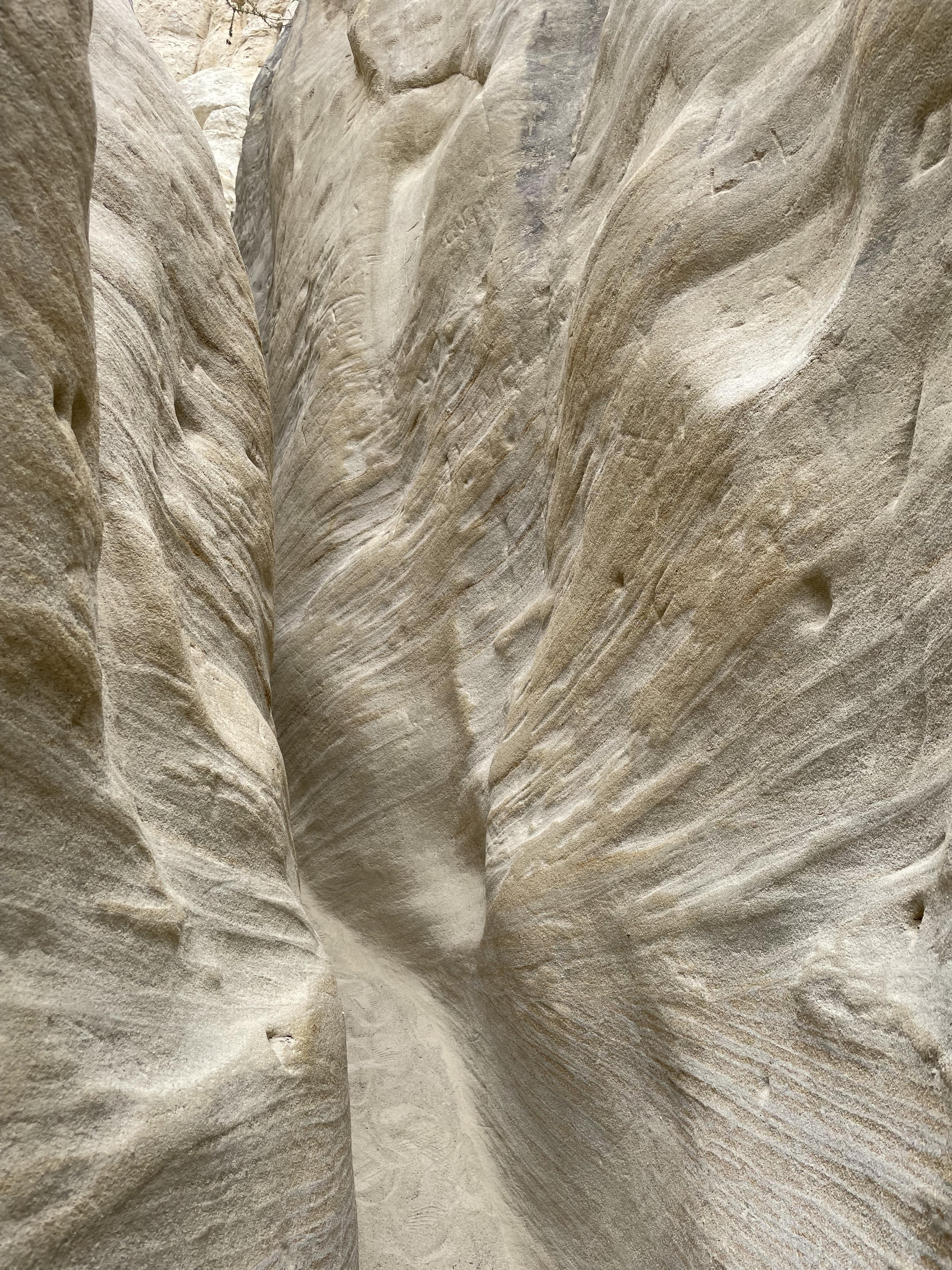
Annie's Canyon, located in San Diego, California

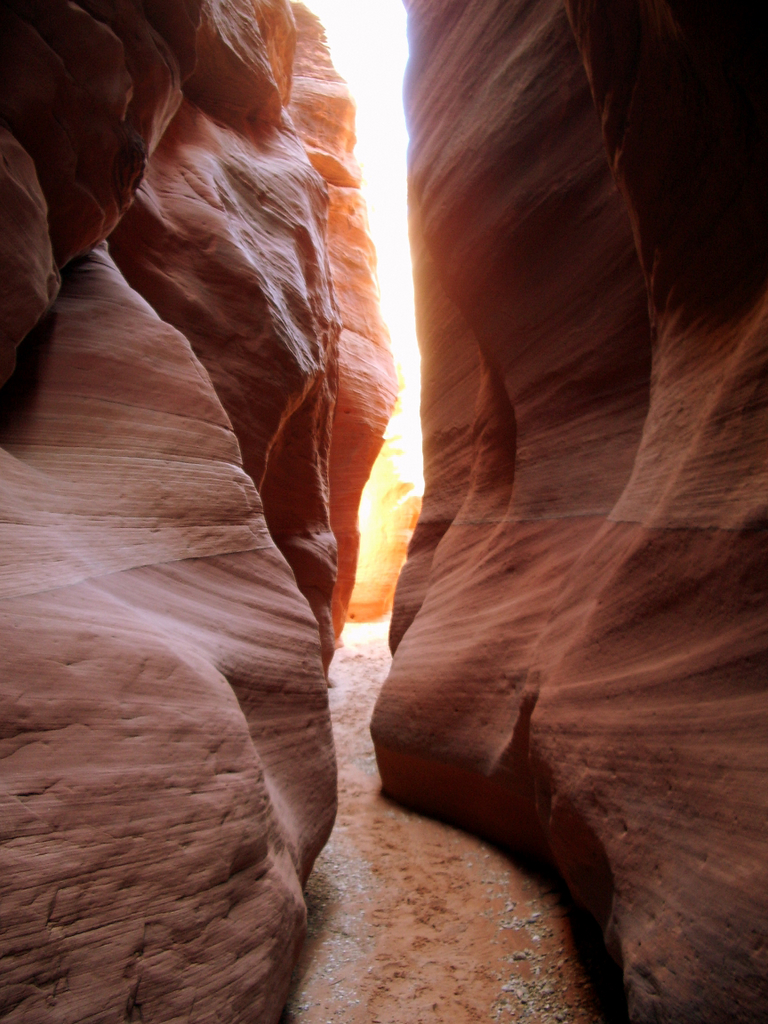
Wire Pass leading into Buckskin Gulch, Utah

=== United States ===
Southern Utah has the densest population of slot canyons in the world with over one thousand slot canyons in the desert lands south of Interstate 70. Utah's slot canyons are found in Zion National Park at The Narrows, along Canyonlands National Park's Joint Trail, throughout Capitol Reef National Park, within the San Rafael Swell and the Grand Staircase–Escalante National Monument, especially along the Escalante River drainage including Coyote Gulch. Many more slot canyons are located on public Bureau of Land Management and state-owned lands in southern Utah, in areas surrounding the aforementioned parks and monuments. Buckskin Gulch—one of the longest slot canyons in the world—begins in southern Utah and continues into northern Arizona within the Paria Canyon-Vermilion Cliffs Wilderness.

Northern Arizona also has a high concentration of slot canyons including Antelope Canyon and Secret Canyon, which are two of the most famous slot canyons located near Page on land owned by the Navajo Nation. Slot canyons are also located in the valley between U.S. Route 89 and the Vermilion Cliffs in Arizona, and can be seen as one descends into the valley on U.S. 89, but these are on the Navajo reservation and are closed to the public.

In New Mexico, Kasha-Katuwe Tent Rocks National Monument's Slot Canyon Trail is unique as it was carved into tuff (volcanic ash). Many more can be found elsewhere on the Pajarito Plateau in the tuff cliffs between the potreros. There are also large concentrations in the basalt mesas surrounding Mt. Taylor, northwest of Grants, and also near Brimhall Nizhoni. The Plaza Blanca Slot Canyon in the white cliffs of the Abiquiu Formation near the town of Abiquiu was the inspiration of some of Georgia O'Keeffe's paintings.

In California, several slot canyons are located within Death Valley National Park.

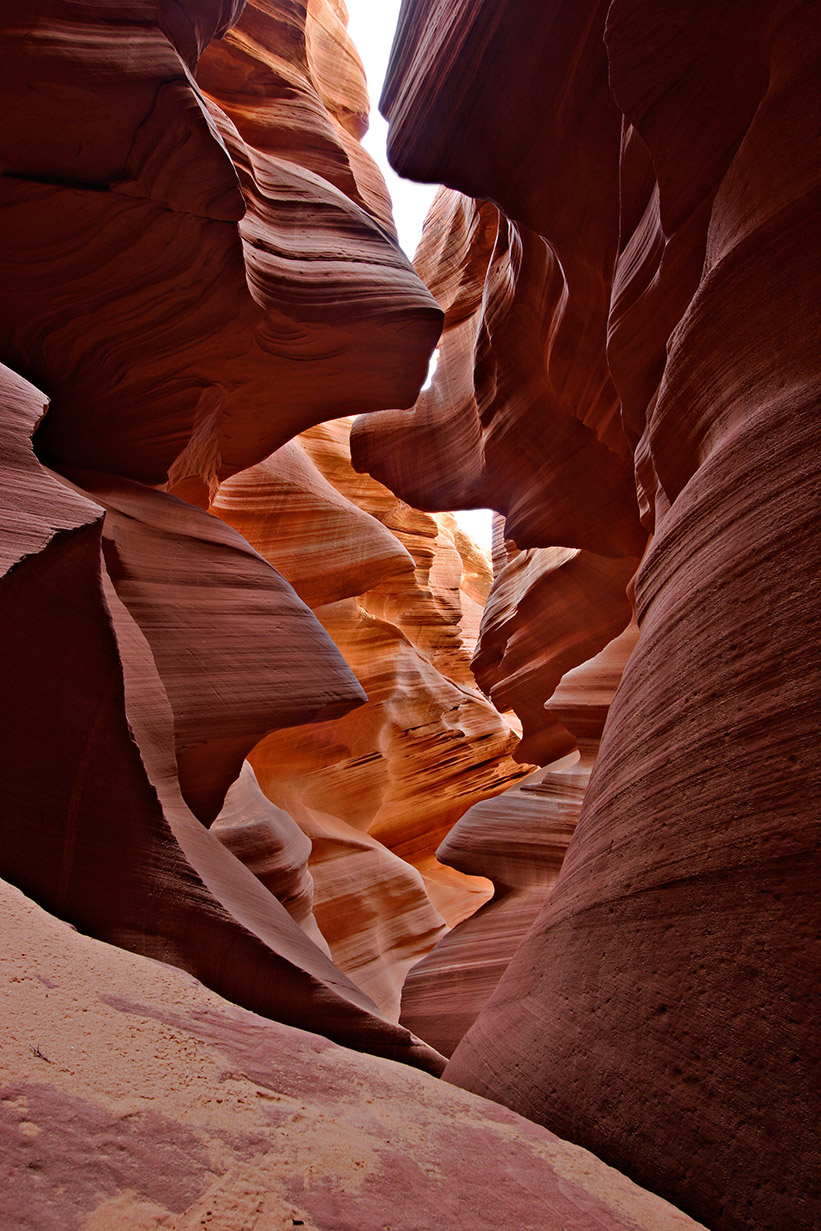
Lower Antelope Canyon, Arizona

=== Europe ===
There are a number of slot canyons in Spain, especially in the arid foothills of the Pyrenees, such as on the Balcez river. There is an extensive tourism industry built around canyoning in this region. In Czechia, there is a spectacular slot canyon in the Teplice Mountains called Little Siberia due to the microclimate, which is several degrees colder than the surrounding area. The canyons in Teplice are surrounded by pillar-like rock formations which resemble various animals and were the site where The Chronicles of Narnia were filmed.

== Hazards ==
Slot canyons can have hazards such as falling rocks, unsteady terrain, narrow slots, slippery surfaces, blockages, steep descents and ascents, potholes, whirlpools (siphons), cold water, duckunders, long swims, fast flowing water, and flash floods. The consequences of falling victim to these hazards can be exacerbated by difficulties or dangers for rescue teams accessing canyons or canyon regions.

Notable incidents have occurred in slot canyons due to hazardous water conditions, particularly dangerous flash flooding caused by local as well as distant storms. Hikers should not enter slot canyons if there is any sign of rain in the surrounding area. In many slot canyons, it can be miles before a safe exit or rescue is possible.

Fatalities have occurred in Australia's Blue Mountains due to flash flooding or hazardous water conditions. Drowning deaths have been recorded in Claustral Canyon, Bowen Creek North Canyon, Empress Canyon, Arethusa Canyon and Wollangambe Canyon. On the 31st of January 1982, three people died in Claustral Canyon due to a flash flood.

On August 12, 1997, eleven tourists, seven from France, one from the United Kingdom, one from Sweden and two from the United States, were killed in Lower Antelope Canyon by a flash flood. Very little rain fell at the site that day, but an earlier thunderstorm had dumped a large amount of water into the canyon basin, seven miles upstream. The lone survivor of the flood was tour guide Francisco "Poncho" Quintana, who had prior swift-water training. At the time, the ladder system consisted of amateur-built wood ladders that were swept away by the flash flood. Today, ladder systems have been bolted in place, and deployable cargo nets are installed at the top of the canyon. A NOAA Weather Radio from the National Weather Service and an alarm horn are stationed at the fee booth.

On July 15, 2021, a Michigan woman died in a flash flood that swept through a slot canyon in Grand Canyon National Park. She was a customer with a commercial rafting group that camped overnight about a quarter of a mile from a slot canyon. Five other people with serious injuries were airlifted from the canyon as a result of the same flash flood.

== Gallery ==
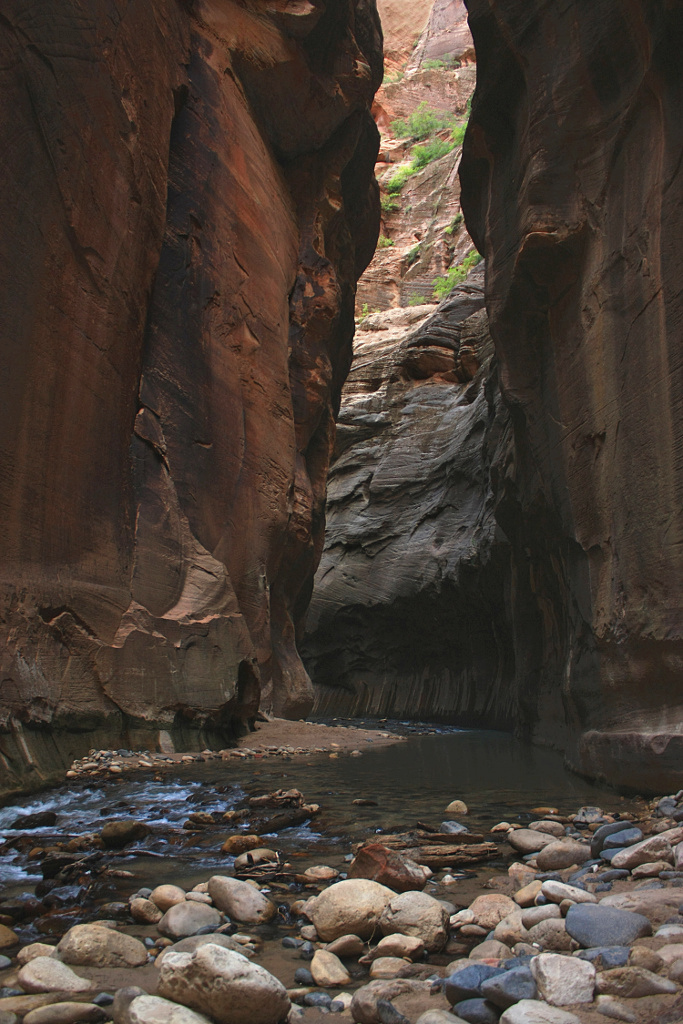
The Narrows, Zion National Park, Utah

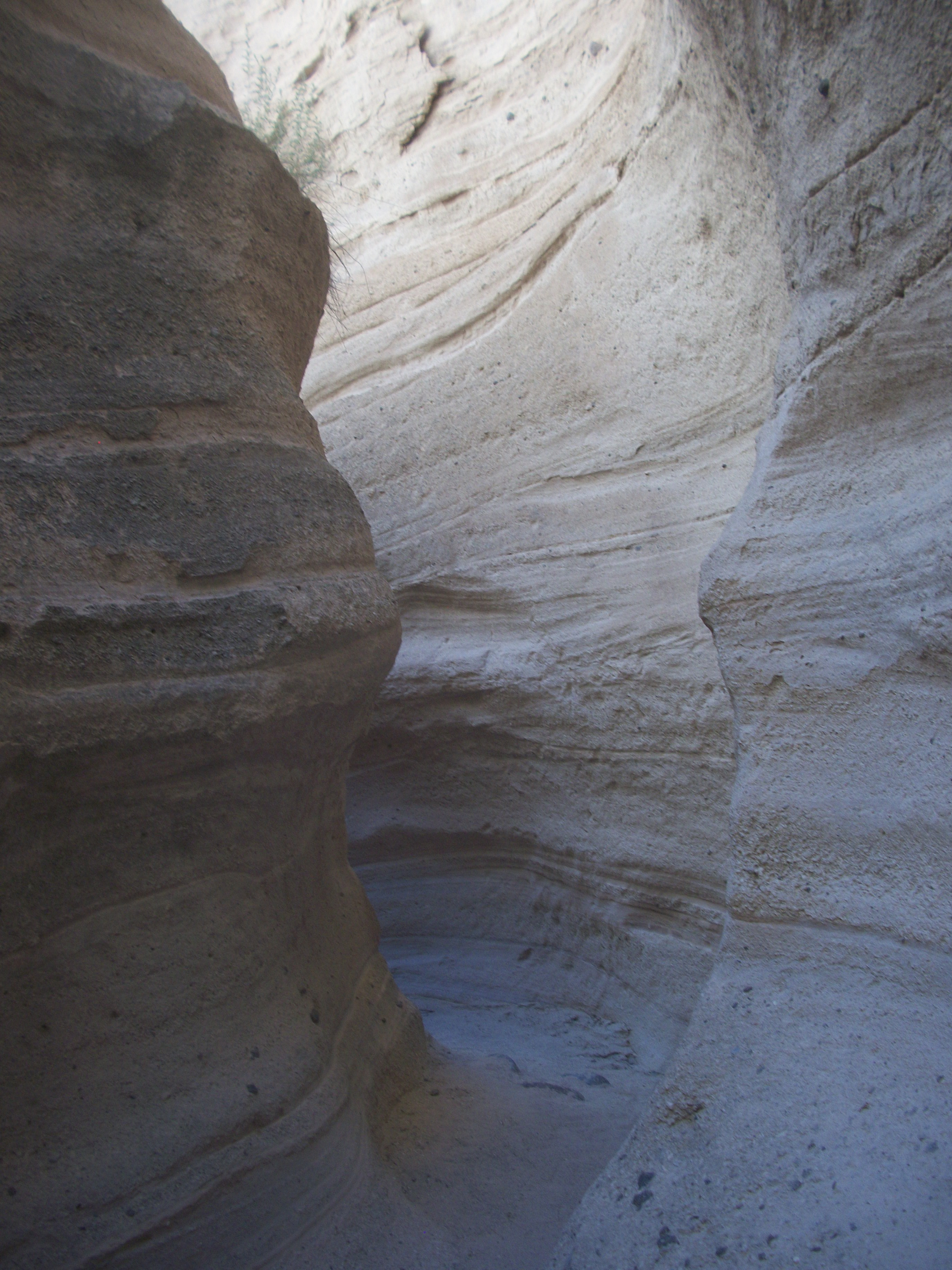
Kasha-Katuwe, New Mexico

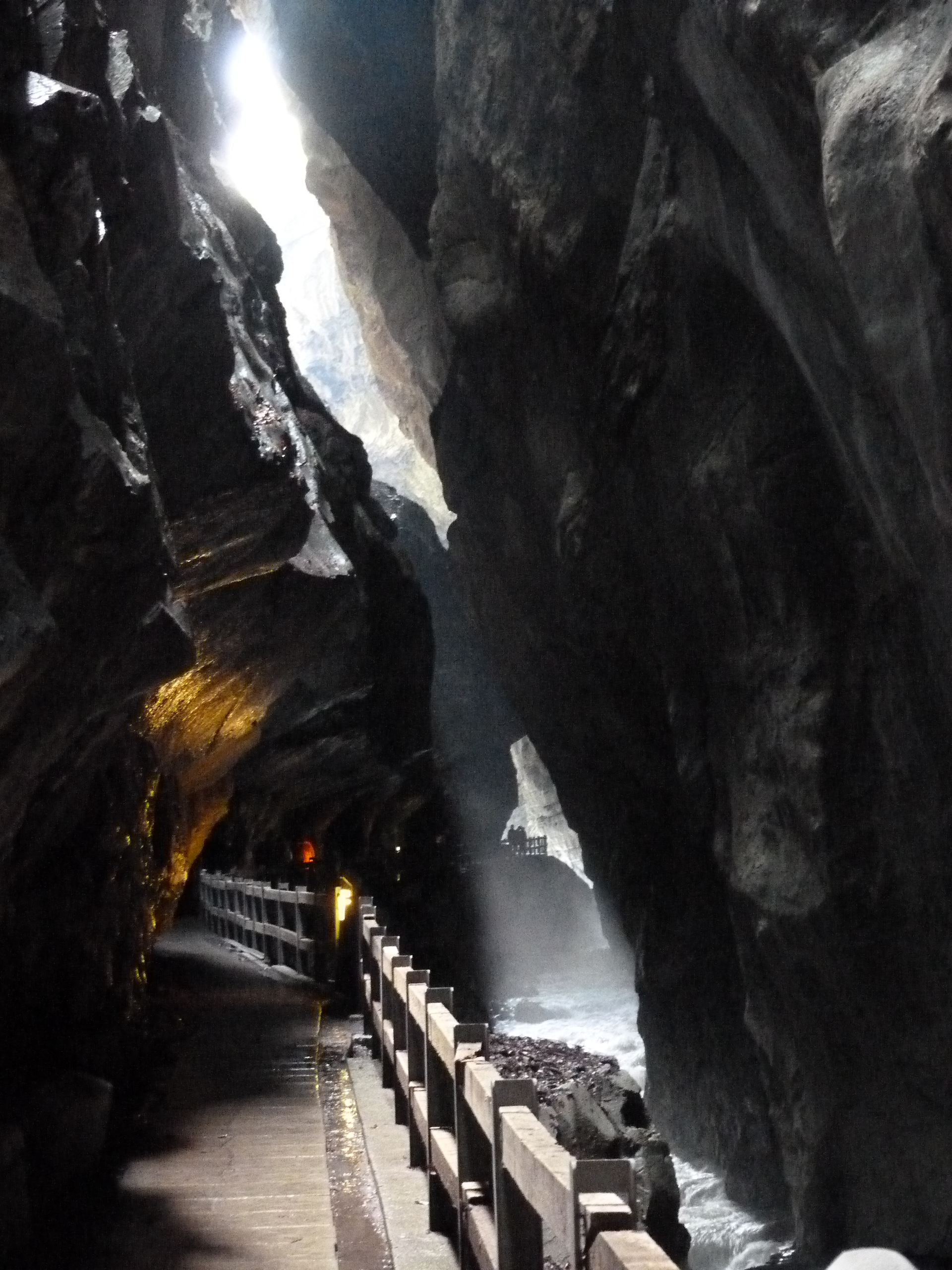
Taminaschlucht, Tamina River, Switzerland

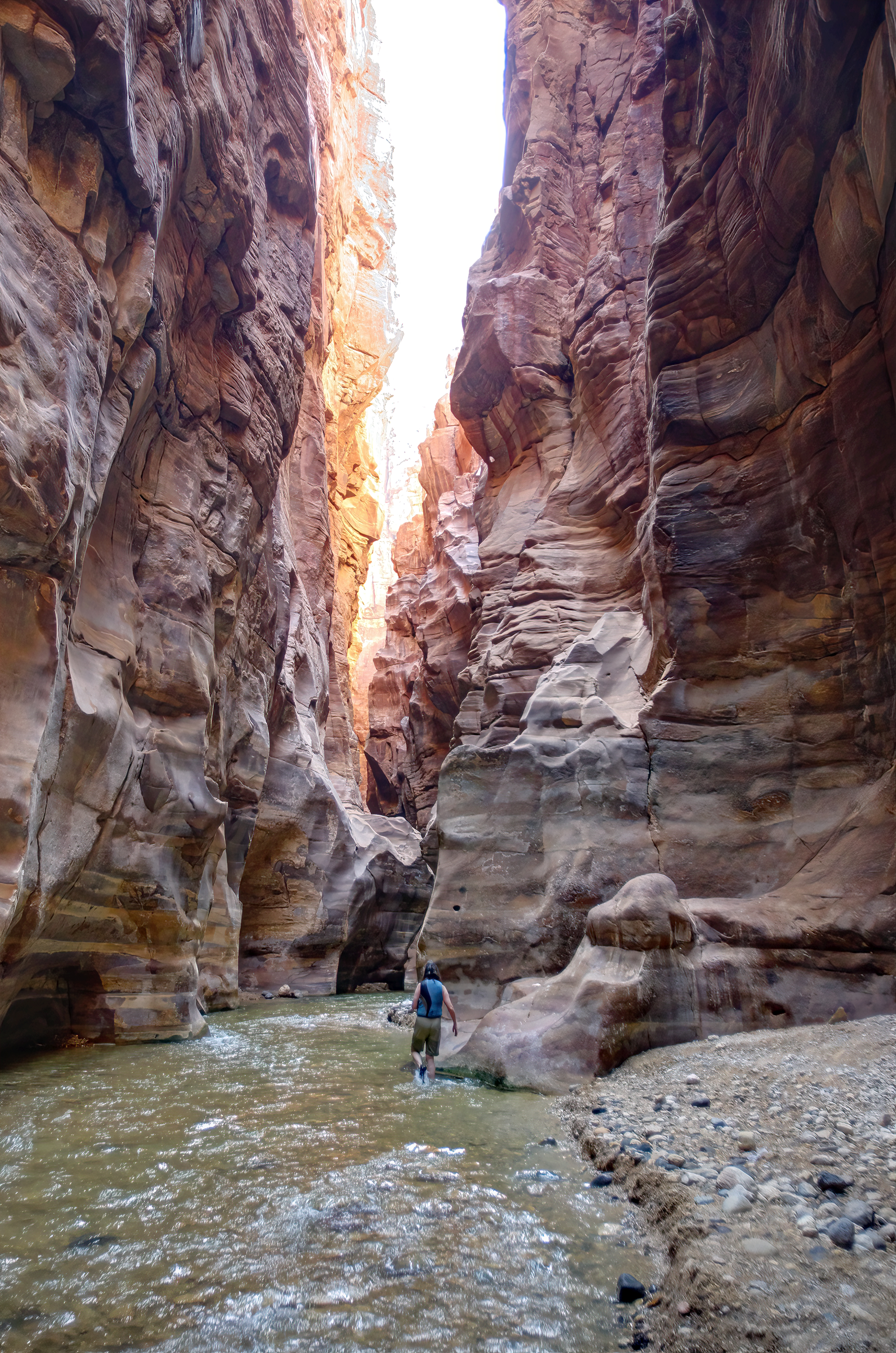
Siq in Wadi Mujib, Jordan
