= Matt Haryasz =

American basketball player

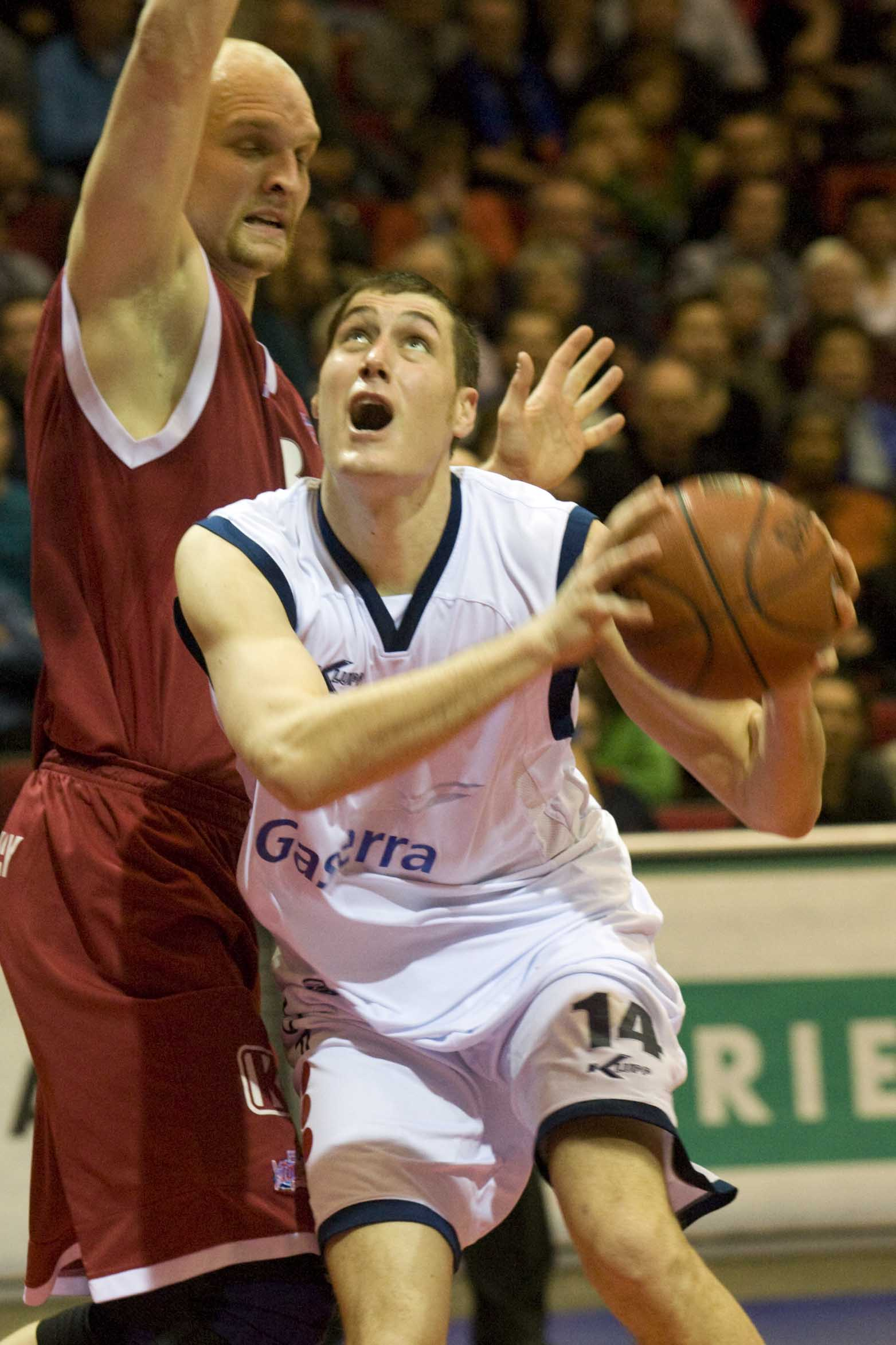
- Haryasz with GasTerra in 2010

Personal information
- Born: March 20, 1984 (age 41) Page, Arizona, U.S.
- Listed height: 6 ft 11 in (2.11 m)
- Listed weight: 229 lb (104 kg)

Career information
- High school: Page (Page, Arizona)
- College: Stanford (2002–2006)
- NBA draft: 2006: undrafted
- Playing career: 2006–2011
- Position: Center

Career history
- 2006–2007: Arkansas RimRockers
- 2007: Napoli
- 2007–2008: Eisbären Bremerhaven
- 2008–2009: Oostende
- 2009: Bnei Herzliya
- 2009–2011: GasTerra Flames

Career highlights
- Dutch League champion (2010); Dutch Cup champion (2011); 2× All-DBL Team (2010–2011); 2× DBL All-Star (2010–2011); First-team All-Pac-10 (2006)

Matt Haryasz (born March 20, 1984) is an American former professional basketball player. Standing at 6 ft 11 in (2.11 m), Haryasz usually played as a center.

== Early life ==
Born in Page, Arizona, Haryasz played high school basketball for Page High School, and averaged 25 points, 12 rebounds and 6 blocks for the team.

== College career ==
Haryasz played four years for the Stanford Cardinal men's basketball team. In his last year, he led Cardinal in scoring (16.2 per game) and rebounding (8.2 per game).

== Professional career ==
In 2006, Haryasz played two pre-season games for the Houston Rockets of the National Basketball Association (NBA). He was released on October 19, 2006. Afterwards he turned professional by signing in the NBA D-League with the Arkansas RimRockers.

In November 2009, Haryasz signed with GasTerra Flames in the Netherlands. Haryasz was one of the top tier players in the Dutch DBL and won the championship in his first season. In his second season, he won the NBB Cup with Flames.
