= Page High School =

Page High School can refer to:

- Fred J. Page High School in Franklin, Tennessee
- Page High School (Page, Arizona) in Page, Arizona
- Walter Hines Page Senior High School in Greensboro, North Carolina
