= Mary Wood =

Mary Wood may refer to:

- Mary Wood, Viscountess Halifax (1807–1884)
- Mary Ramsey Wood (died 1908), American pioneer
- Mary Wood Swift (1841–1927), née Wood, American suffragist and clubwoman
- Mary C. F. Hall-Wood (1842/3–1899), American poet, editor, and author
- Mary Knight Wood (1857–1944), American pianist, music educator and composer
- Mary Elizabeth Wood (1861–1931), American librarian and missionary
- Mary Inez Wood (1866–1945), American writer and leader in women's rights
- Mary Hay Wood (1868–1933), English educator and teacher trainer
- Mary Myfanwy Wood (1882–1967), British missionary in China
- Mary Evelyn Wood (1900–1978), politician and nurse in the Cayman Islands
- Mary Wood (baseball) (fl. 1946), American (AAGPBL) baseball player
- Mary Antonia Wood (born 1959), American painter and sculptor
- Mary Christina Wood (born 1962), American professor of law and author

== See also ==
- Mary Wood-Allen (1841–1908), American doctor, social reformer, lecturer, and writer
- Mary Woods (disambiguation)
- Wood (surname)
