= Kaibito, Arizona =

CDP in Apache County, Arizona

Kaibeto, Arizona K’ai’bii’tó (Navajo)
- CDP
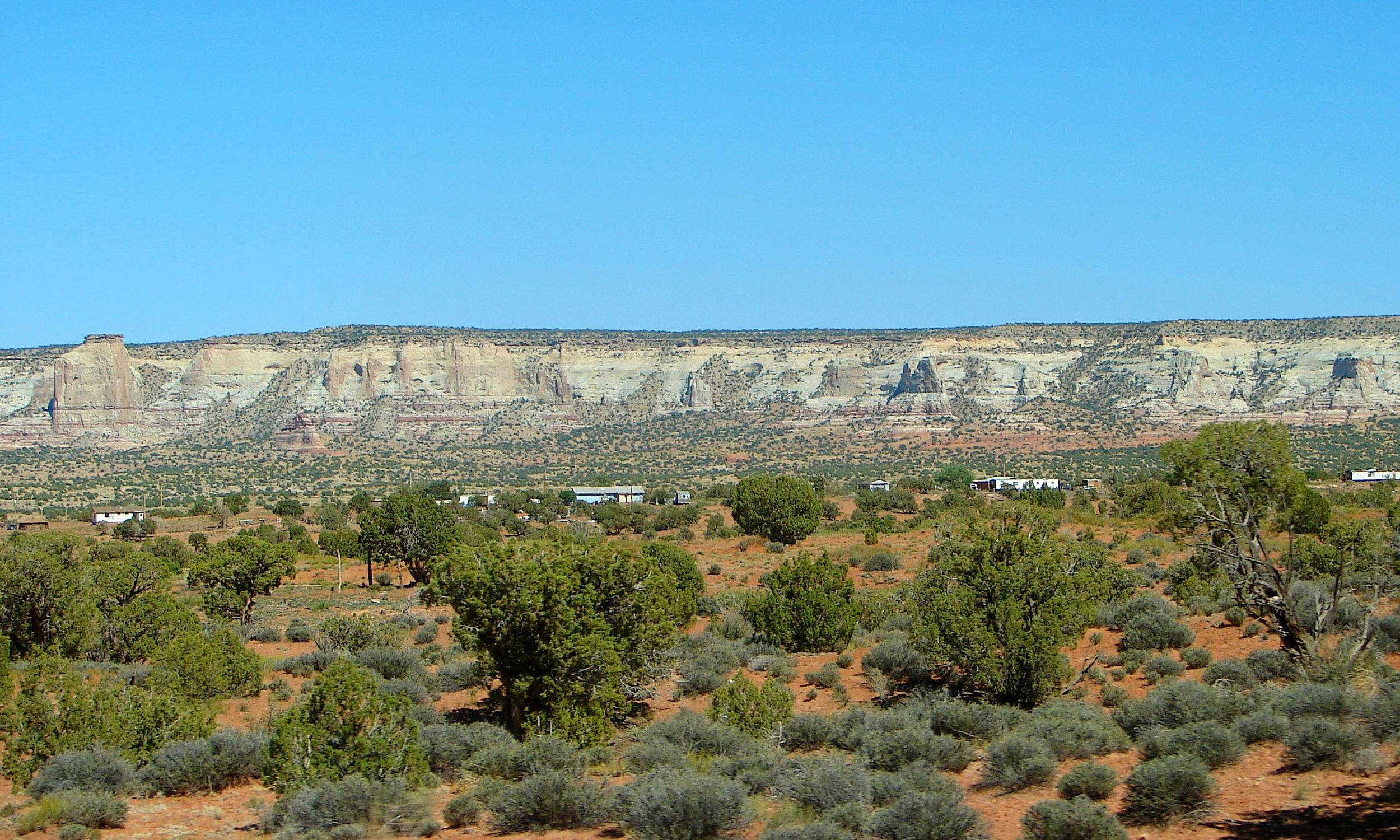

- Location in Coconino County and the state of Arizona

- Location in the United States
- Coordinates: 36°35′56″N 111°07′45″W
- Country: United States
- State: Arizona
- County: Coconino

Area
  - Total: 15.90 sq mi (41.18 km^{2})
  - Land: 15.90 sq mi (41.18 km^{2})
  - Water: 0 sq mi (0.00 km^{2})
- Elevation: 6,037 ft (1,840 m)

Population (2020)
  - Total: 1,540
  - Density: 96.8/sq mi (37.39/km^{2})
- Time zone: UTC-7 (MST)
  - Summer (DST): UTC-6 (MDT)
- ZIP code: 86053
- Area code: 928
- FIPS code: 04-36640
- GNIS feature ID: 2408460

Kaibeto (Navajo: K’ai’bii’tó) is a census-designated place (CDP) in Coconino County, Arizona, United States, on the Navajo Nation. The population was 1,522 at the 2010 census.

== Geography ==
According to the United States Census Bureau, the CDP has a total area of 16.0 square miles (41 km^{2}), all land.

It is 40 miles (64 km) south of Page, and at the midpoint between that city and Tuba City.

=== Climate ===
According to the Köppen Climate Classification system, Kaibeto has a semi-arid climate, abbreviated "BSk" on climate maps.

== Demographics ==
Historical population
Census	Pop.	Note	%±
2000	1,607		—
2010	1,522		−5.3%
2020	1,540		1.2%
U.S. Decennial Census

=== 2020 census ===
As of the 2020 census, Kaibito had a population of 1,540. The median age was 26.8 years. 37.7% of residents were under the age of 18 and 8.8% of residents were 65 years of age or older. For every 100 females there were 94.0 males, and for every 100 females age 18 and over there were 84.8 males age 18 and over.

0.0% of residents lived in urban areas, while 100.0% lived in rural areas.

There were 353 households in Kaibito, of which 55.0% had children under the age of 18 living in them. Of all households, 41.1% were married-couple households, 16.4% were households with a male householder and no spouse or partner present, and 35.1% were households with a female householder and no spouse or partner present. About 15.8% of all households were made up of individuals and 7.4% had someone living alone who was 65 years of age or older.

There were 425 housing units, of which 16.9% were vacant. The homeowner vacancy rate was 0.0% and the rental vacancy rate was 7.9%.

Racial composition as of the 2020 census
Race	Number	Percent
White	4	0.3%
Black or African American	1	0.1%
American Indian and Alaska Native	1,511	98.1%
Asian	0	0.0%
Native Hawaiian and Other Pacific Islander	0	0.0%
Some other race	1	0.1%
Two or more races	23	1.5%
Hispanic or Latino (of any race)	15	1.0%

=== 2000 census ===
As of the census of 2000, there were 1,607 people, 333 households, and 302 families living in the CDP. The population density was 100.6 inhabitants per square mile (38.8/km^{2}). There were 398 housing units at an average density of 24.9 per square mile (9.6/km^{2}). The racial makeup of the CDP was 99.2% Native American, 0.4% White, 0.1% Black or African American, and 0.4% from two or more races. 0.1% of the population were Hispanic or Latino of any race.

Of the 333 households, 68.2% had children under the age of 18 living with them, 65.8% were married couples living together, 21.3% had a female householder with no husband present, and 9.3% were non-families. 8.7% of all households were made up of individuals, and 2.7% had someone living alone who was 65 years of age or older. The average household size was 4.83 and the average family size was 5.17.

In the CDP, the population was spread out, with 49.3% under the age of 18, 11.1% from 18 to 24, 24.3% from 25 to 44, 12.0% from 45 to 64, and 3.3% who were 65 years of age or older. The median age was 18 years. For every 100 females, there were 97.2 males. For every 100 females age 18 and over, there were 87.4 males.

The median income for a household in the CDP was $36,250, and the median income for a family was $41,016. Males had a median income of $31,477 versus $18,472 for females. The per capita income for the CDP was $8,465. About 25.7% of families and 28.8% of the population were below the poverty line, including 30.4% of those under age 18 and 34.4% of those age 65 or over.

== Education ==
There are two Bureau of Indian Education (BIE)-affiliated schools for Native Americans in the area, the K-8 Kaibeto Boarding School in Kaibito and the Shonto Preparatory School (K-12) in Shonto.

Most of the Kaibito CDP is served by the Page Unified School District, while a portion is in the Tuba City Unified School District. Page High School and Tuba City High School are their respective comprehensive high schools.

== See also ==
- List of census-designated places in Arizona
- List of communities on the Navajo Nation
