= Coyote Gulch =

Gulch in Garfield and Kane counties in Utah, United States

Coordinates: 37°25′41″N 110°58′51″W

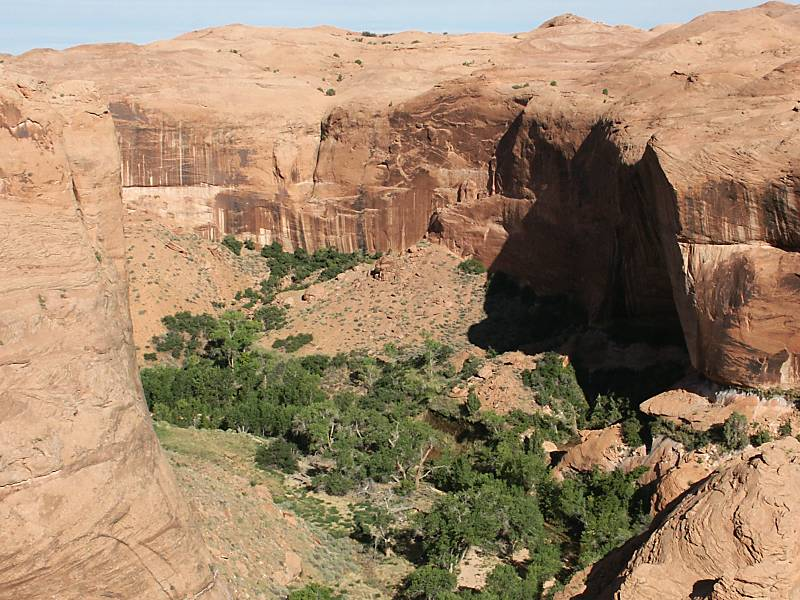
Main canyon of Coyote Gulch

Route of Coyote Gulch

Coyote Gulch is a tributary of the Escalante River, located in Garfield and Kane Counties in southern Utah, in the western United States. Over 25 mi (40 km) long, Coyote Gulch exhibits many of the geologic features found in the Canyons of the Escalante, including high vertical canyon walls, narrow slot canyons, domes, arches, and natural bridges. The upper sections of Coyote Gulch are located within the Grand Staircase–Escalante National Monument, while its lower sections are located in the Glen Canyon National Recreation Area.

The headwaters of Coyote Gulch originates along a 14 mi (23 km) segment of the Straight Cliffs Formation which is the eastern edge of the Kaiparowits Plateau. Intermittent streams flowing down the Straight Cliffs merge to form larger branches, including Dry Fork, Big Hollow, the main branch of Coyote Gulch, and Hurricane Wash. The combined flow from these branches has carved a canyon up to 900 ft (270 m) deep into sandstone layers before meeting the Escalante River.

== Canyon access ==
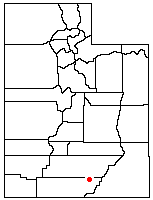
Location of Coyote Gulch within Utah

The main canyon of Coyote Gulch can be accessed by one of several trailheads located along the Hole-in-the-Rock Road (HITRR). The HITRR is an unpaved road that heads southeast into the Grand Staircase–Escalante National Monument, branching off Utah Scenic Byway 12 about 5 mi (8.0 km) east of Escalante. The Red Well trailhead is at the end of a short spur road off the HITRR, and leads into the main channel near its junction with Big Hollow Wash. The trail into Hurricane Wash starts just off the HITRR. A trailhead located near some stock watering tanks along Fortymile Ridge Road—another spur of the HITRR—can be used for a cross-country route to the middle of Coyote Gulch. This route involves a rather steep climb over slick rock. A trailhead at the end of the Fortymile Ridge Road leads to the junction of Coyote Gulch, the Escalante River, and Stevens Canyon. This route involves squeezing through a crack in the rim of the canyon—referred to as the Crack-in-the-Wall route—and then descending down the face of a 600 ft (180 m) high sand dune.

== Features ==
The sandy streambed of Coyote Gulch, typically just a few inches/centimeters deep, provides a path for wading through the trees and vegetation lining the bottom of the canyon. Near the middle of the main canyon's length is Jacob Hamblin Arch—also known as Lobo Arch—which is large enough to reach under an overhang on the opposite side of the canyon. Further downstream within the canyon is Coyote Natural Bridge a small hole carved in a large sandstone fin. Still further downstream is Cliff Arch, a jug-handle style arch in the north wall of the canyon. Finally, just outside the mouth of the canyon and high above the Escalante River is Stevens Arch with an opening approximately 220 ft (67 m) wide.

There are also numerous small waterfalls and cascades in the canyon between Jacob Hamblin Arch and the confluence with the Escalante River. Some of these waterfalls can be easily climbed, but others must be bypassed.

== Dry Fork ==
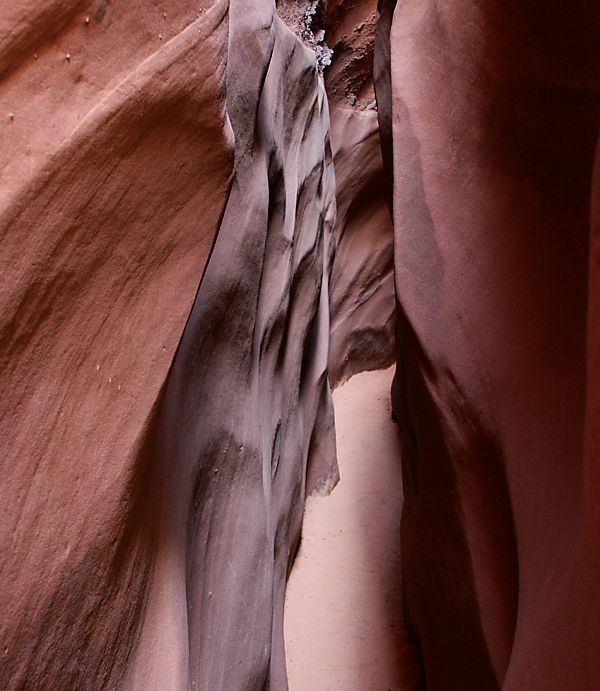
Spooky Gulch (video)

The northernmost branch of Coyote Gulch—called the Dry Fork—is one of the most popular destinations in the area. A short spur road leads off from the Hole-in-the-Rock Road to a trailhead above the wash. A brief descent to the canyon floor leads to several tributary slot canyons. The Dry Fork is an excellent example of how occasional flash floods over long periods of time have carved narrow grooves into the Navajo Sandstone. Approximately 20 ft (6.1 m) deep, the Dry Fork slot can be followed upstream for several hundred yards/meters. Just downstream from the mouth of the Dry Fork is Peekaboo Gulch which has carved an even narrower channel into the sandstone, leading to a tube that empties into the dry wash of the main streambed. Further downstream, Spooky Gulch is over 30 ft (9.1 m) deep, but the channel rarely widens to more than 15 in (38 cm), forcing hikers to remove their backpacks and walk sideways. Finally, even further downstream in the main wash, Brimstone Gulch is the last named slot canyon in the Dry Fork area and is even narrower than Spooky Gulch, eventually reaching a width that is impassable to all hikers except animals smaller than mice and insects.

== Gallery ==
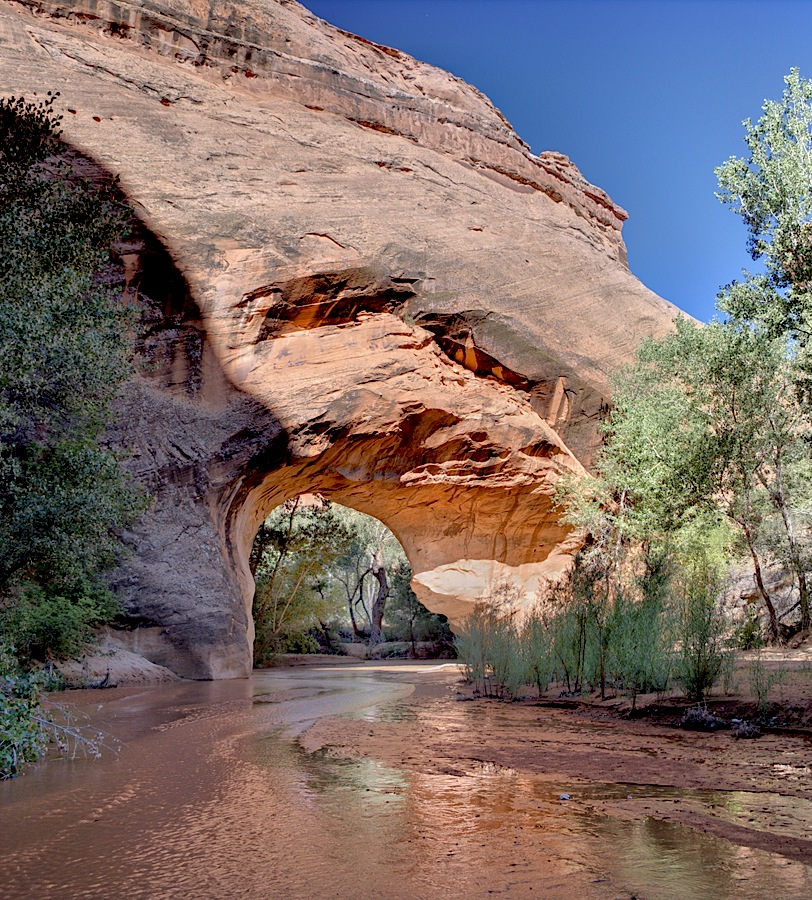
Coyote Natural Bridge

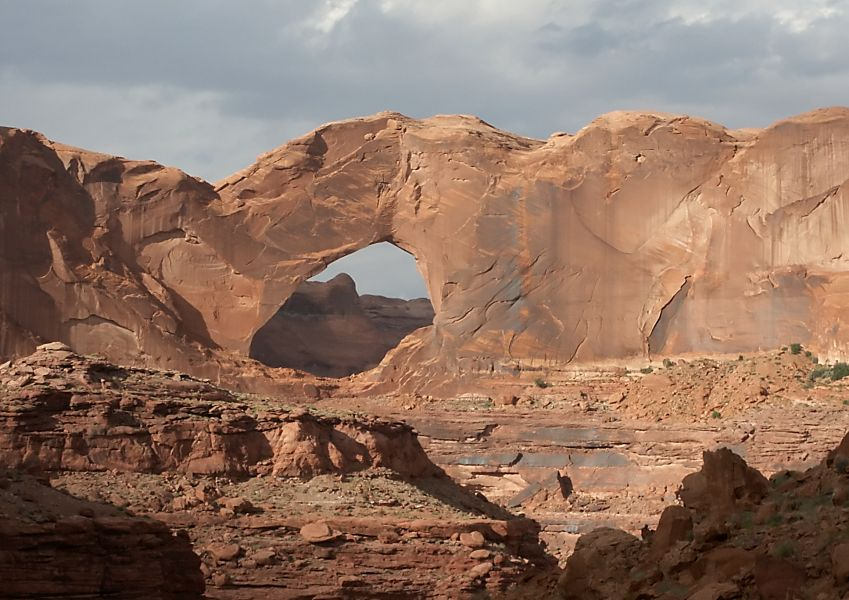
Stevens Arch

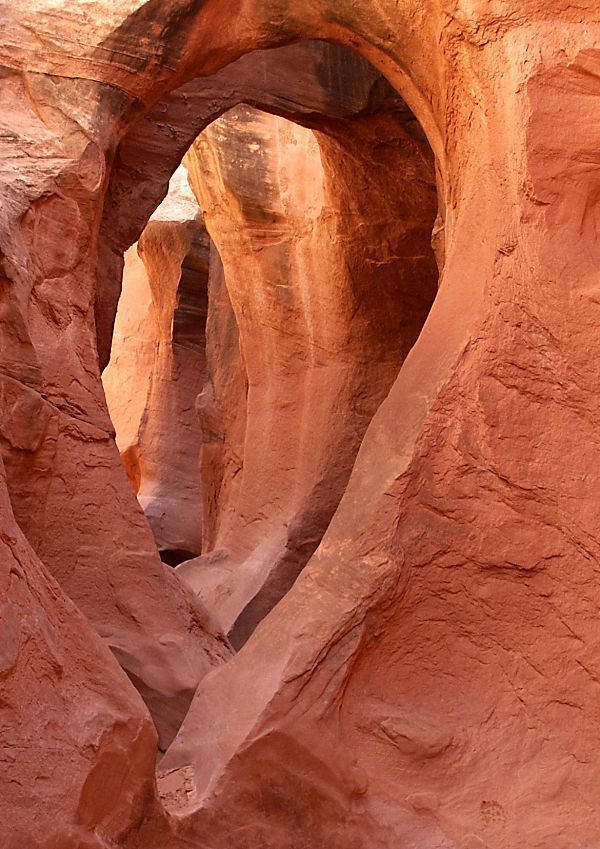
Peek-a-Boo Gulch

== See also ==
- List of canyons and gorges in Utah
- List of rivers of Utah
