= KXAZ =

- Page, Arizona; United States
- Frequency: 93.3 MHz
- Branding: Rewind 93

Programming
- Format: Classic hits

Ownership
- Owner: Southwest Broadcasting
- Sister stations: KPGE

History
- First air date: November 2, 1981

Technical information
- Licensing authority: FCC
- Facility ID: 36340
- Class: C2
- ERP: 12,500 watts
- HAAT: 281 meters (922 feet)
- Transmitter coordinates: 37°00′42″N 111°40′48″W
- Translator: 100.1 K261BX (Page)

Links
- Public license information: Public file; LMS

KXAZ (93.3 FM, "Rewind 93") is a radio station licensed to serve Page, Arizona, United States. The station is owned by Southwest Broadcasting and airs a classic hits music format.

The station was assigned the KXAZ call sign by the Federal Communications Commission on November 2, 1981.

== History ==
On April 2, 2012, KXAZ changed its format from adult contemporary to classic hits. On March 29, 2014, KXAZ changed its format from classic hits to Jack FM, which is their current format.

KXAZ began streaming online on February 6, 2017. Its online stream can be found at kxaz.streamon.fm.

The station went silent on December 31, 2022, upon the retirement of owner Janet Brown. In November 2023, KXAZ and sister station KPGE were purchased by Vance and Karey Barbee's Southwest Broadcasting and returned to the air.
