= KPGE =

- Page, Arizona; United States
- Frequency: 1340 kHz
- Branding: Kix 98.3

Programming
- Format: Country

Ownership
- Owner: Southwest Broadcasting, LLC
- Sister stations: KXAZ

History
- First air date: 1971
- Call sign meaning: Page

Technical information
- Licensing authority: FCC
- Facility ID: 36349
- Class: C
- Power: 1,000 watts (day); 1,000 watts (night)
- Transmitter coordinates: 36°54′20″N 111°27′28.6″W
- Translator: 98.3 K252FG (Page)

Links
- Public license information: Public file; LMS
- Website: kix98.com

KPGE (1340 AM) is a radio station broadcasting a country music format. Licensed to Page, Arizona, United States, the station is owned by Southwest Broadcasting, LLC.

The station's skywave signal was reported in Salt Lake City on 2007-11-27 and audio proof of the station was recorded.

The station went silent on December 31, 2022, upon the retirement of owner Janet Brown. In November 2023, KPGE and sister station KXAZ were purchased by Vance and Karey Barbee's Southwest Broadcasting and returned to the air.

Two earlier stations previously occupied on the 1340 AM Frequency in the 1960s, both of them being named KPGE.
