= Page Unified School District =

School district in Arizona, United States

Address
- 500 South Navajo Drive Page, Arizona, 86040; United States

District information
- Type: Public
- Grades: PreK–12
- NCES District ID: 0405820

Students and staff
- Students: 2,497
- Teachers: 125.0
- Staff: 154.5
- Student–teacher ratio: 19.98

Other information
- Website: www.pageud.org

The Page Unified School District is the school district for Page, Arizona, United States. It operates and oversees four schools: Early Childhood Learning Center, Lake View Elementary School, Page High School, and Manson Mesa High School. The superintendent is Dr. Bryce Anderson, serving since July 1, 2022. The student enrollment in the 2024-2025 school year is 2,265 students, serving over 80% of Native Americans, 11.39% White, and smaller percentages of other races.

The district serves a portion of Page as well as Bitter Springs, LeChee and most of Kaibito CDP.
