= Mary Woods =

Mary Woods may refer to:

- Mary Dixon-Woods, Irish social scientist and professor
- Mary Lee Woods (1924–2017), English mathematician and computer scientist
- Mary Tenison Woods (1893–1971), South Australian lawyer and social activist

== See also ==
- Mary Wood (disambiguation)
