= LeChee, Arizona =

CDP in Coconino County, Arizona

LeChee, Arizona Łichíiʼii (Navajo)
- Census-designated place
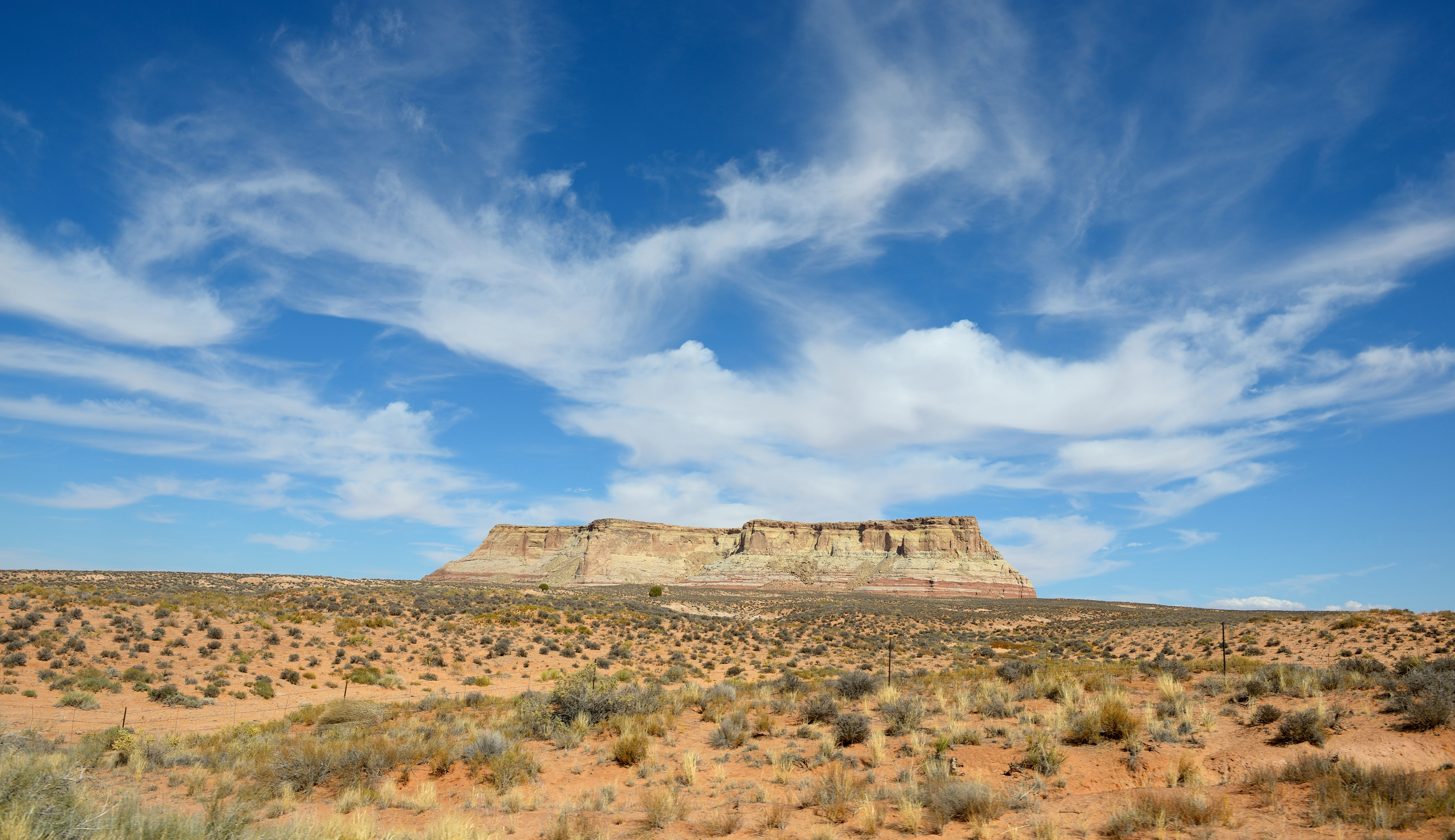
- LeChee Rock (the namesake of LeChee), as viewed from Arizona State Route 98 east of LeChee, October 2012

- Location in Coconino County and the state of Arizona

- Location in the United States
- Coordinates: 36°52′26″N 111°25′54″W
- Country: United States
- State: Arizona
- County: Coconino

Area
  - Total: 16.62 sq mi (43.05 km^{2})
  - Land: 16.62 sq mi (43.05 km^{2})
  - Water: 0 sq mi (0.00 km^{2})
- Elevation: 4,410 ft (1,340 m)

Population (2020)
  - Total: 1,236
  - Density: 74.4/sq mi (28.71/km^{2})
- Time zone: UTC-7 (MST)
- ZIP code: 86040
- Area code: 928
- FIPS code: 04-40415
- GNIS feature ID: 2408596

LeChee is a census-designated place (CDP) in Coconino County, Arizona, United States. The population was 1,443 at the 2010 census.

== Geography ==
LeChee lies in the northwest corner of the Navajo Nation adjacent to the southeastern side of the non-reservation city of Page.

According to the United States Census Bureau, the CDP has a total area of 16.9 square miles (44 km^{2}), all land.

== Demographics ==
Historical population
Census	Pop.	Note	%±
2020	1,236		—
U.S. Decennial Census

=== 2020 census ===
As of the 2020 census, LeChee had a population of 1,236. The median age was 33.5 years. 26.1% of residents were under the age of 18 and 12.0% of residents were 65 years of age or older. For every 100 females there were 102.6 males, and for every 100 females age 18 and over there were 97.6 males age 18 and over.

0.0% of residents lived in urban areas, while 100.0% lived in rural areas.

There were 348 households in LeChee, of which 36.2% had children under the age of 18 living in them. Of all households, 46.0% were married-couple households, 22.4% were households with a male householder and no spouse or partner present, and 25.9% were households with a female householder and no spouse or partner present. About 24.2% of all households were made up of individuals and 9.2% had someone living alone who was 65 years of age or older.

There were 388 housing units, of which 10.3% were vacant. The homeowner vacancy rate was 0.0% and the rental vacancy rate was 0.0%.

Racial composition as of the 2020 census
Race	Number	Percent
White	9	0.7%
Black or African American	3	0.2%
American Indian and Alaska Native	1,161	93.9%
Asian	1	0.1%
Native Hawaiian and Other Pacific Islander	0	0.0%
Some other race	1	0.1%
Two or more races	61	4.9%
Hispanic or Latino (of any race)	19	1.5%

=== 2000 census ===
As of the census of 2000, there were 1,606 people, 332 households, and 310 families living in the CDP. The population density was 94.8 inhabitants per square mile (36.6/km^{2}). There were 386 housing units at an average density of 22.8 per square mile (8.8/km^{2}). The racial makeup of the CDP was 98.4% Native American, 0.8% (or 12 people) White, and 0.9% (or 14 people) from two or more races. Fifteen members (or 0.9%) of the population were Hispanic or Latino of any race.

There were 332 households, out of which 74.1% had children under the age of 18 living with them, 62.7% were married couples living together, 23.8% had a female householder with no husband present, and 6.6% were non-families. 6.0% of all households were made up of individuals, and 1.8% had someone living alone who was 65 years of age or older. The average household size was 4.84 and the average family size was 4.95.

In the CDP, the age distribution of the population shows 49.9% under the age of 18, 9.7% from 18 to 24, 27.3% from 25 to 44, 10.6% from 45 to 64, and 2.5% who were 65 years of age or older. The median age was 18 years. For every 100 females, there were 102.0 males. For every 100 females age 18 and over, there were 98.3 males.

The median income for a household in the CDP was $48,375, and the median income for a family was $42,212. Males had a median income of $31,250 versus $27,188 for females. The per capita income for the CDP was $10,378. About 16.2% of families and 15.5% of the population were below the poverty line, including 20.5% of those under age 18 and none of those age 65 or over.

== Education ==
LeChee is served by the Page Unified School District. Page High School is the local high school.

== See also ==
- List of census-designated places in Arizona
