= Kaibeto Boarding School =

BIE school in Coconino County, Arizona

Coordinates: 36.5821°N 111.0939°W

Kaibeto Boarding School, formerly Kaibeto Day School, is a public K-8 boarding school in Kaibito, Arizona, operated by the Bureau of Indian Education (BIE). The school has a capacity of 640 students and has 22 classrooms, four dormitories, and one cafeteria.

== History ==
It opened in 1935 as a day school only, with 45 enrolled students in a group of stone buildings, after the area community asked for a local school from the federal authorities. The average daily attendance was 19. A boarding facility opened in former army barracks after the area residents requested boarding circa 1940. A new building, Kaibeto Primary School, which had four classrooms and two dormitory facilities along with a cafeteria, began construction circa 1953 with construction completed in 1954 as the result of a request Amos Singer made of federal authorities in 1948. However the original facility was used due to overcrowding that the newer buildings could not handle. Another dormitory along with a cafeteria expansion, new employee housing and apartments in converted older school buildings, a multipurpose room, and four classrooms were built or established in 1961. The elementary and junior high divisions became a consolidated institution in 1975.

Phyllis Newell-Yazzie became principal circa 2011. Previously a charitable program from Children Incorporated served 47 students and gave them school supplies and clothes, but after a woman embezzled money from the operation, the charity ended its service at Kaibeto School by 2013.

The school board voted to fire Newell-Yazzie on two occasions that the BIE overturned because the agency felt it lacked documentation. After an accountant made a presentation about improperly spent money on January 8, 2015, Newell-Yazzie fired the person on January 14. The board then attempted to meet two times to discuss whether she should be terminated: January 15 and January 20. When Newell-Yazzie learned of each attempt, she locked the room to obstruct the firing. After the second attempt the board met the same day at the Kaibeto Chapter House and voted to fire her a third time. In March 2015 the BIE announced that she was not the principal anymore.

During the COVID-19 pandemic in Arizona, Kaibeto Boarding stopped in-person classes and several employees tested positive for COVID. The school sought to do online learning once the start of in-person classes arrived, but the school was unable to have electronic equipment delivered for online learning, and staff were unable to find the proper equipment on the school premises. Kaibeto Boarding instead sent paper packets to students and students texted their teachers each morning to confirm attendance. The advisory council of Kaibeto School criticized the BIE for allowing COVID to affect the employees and pupils and sent a letter to Tony Dearman, the head of the BIE.
