= Mary Antonia Wood =

American artist

- Born: 1959 (age 66–67); Page, Arizona
- Education: Northern Arizona University

Mary Antonia Wood (born 1959 in Page, Arizona) is an American painter and sculptor of Mexican descent who creates two- and three-dimensional constructions. In 1981, she received her bachelor of fine arts degree from Northern Arizona University and continued her studies at the University of New Mexico. Wood's works explore traditions of pre-Hispanic Mexican and Central American art. They are created by applying plaster to wood panels with several coats of natural beeswax.
