= Page High School (Page, Arizona) =

Public school in Page, Arizona

Location
- 434 Lake Powell Blvd; Page, Arizona 86040; United States
- Coordinates: 36°54′42″N 111°27′24″W

Information
- School type: Public high school
- Established: 1959 (67 years ago)
- School district: Page Unified School District
- CEEB code: 030239
- Principal: Leigh Guenther
- Teaching staff: 36.75 (FTE)
- Grades: 9–12
- Enrollment: 812 (2023-2024)
- Student to teacher ratio: 22.10
- Colors: Red, black and white
- Nickname: Sand Devils
- Website: phs.pageud.org

Page High School is a high school in Page, Arizona, United States. It is part of the Page Unified School District. It opened in 1959. Serving over 750 students with a population over 7,000.

Page USD, and therefore Page High School, serves a portion of Page as well as Bitter Springs, LeChee and most of Kaibito CDP.
