= Page, Arizona =

City in Coconino County, Arizona, US

- City
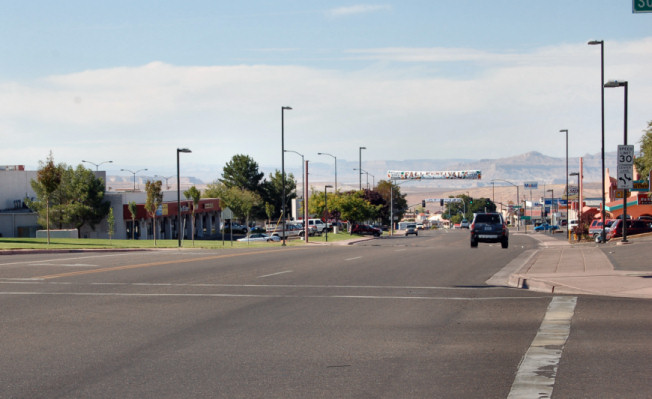
- View of Lake Powell Boulevard in Page

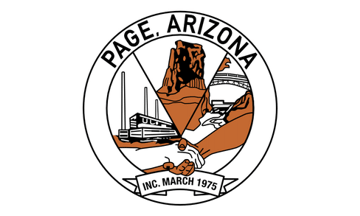
- Flag
- Motto: "The Center of Canyon Country"
- Location of Page in Coconino County, Arizona
- Location in the United States Page, Arizona (Arizona)
- Coordinates: 36°54′51″N 111°30′12″W
- Country: United States
- State: Arizona
- County: Coconino

Government
  - Type: Council-Manager
  - Mayor: Steve Kindman

Area
  - Total: 38.33 sq mi (99.27 km^{2})
  - Land: 38.18 sq mi (98.89 km^{2})
  - Water: 0.15 sq mi (0.38 km^{2})
- Elevation: 4,101 ft (1,250 m)

Population (2020)
  - Total: 7,440
  - Density: 194.8/sq mi (75.23/km^{2})
- Time zone: UTC−7 (MST)
  - Summer (DST): UTC−7 (no DST/PDT)
- ZIP codes: 86036, 86040
- Area code: 928
- FIPS code: 04-51810
- GNIS feature ID: 2411352
- Website: cityofpage.org

Page is a city in Coconino County, Arizona, United States, near the Glen Canyon Dam and Lake Powell. As of the 2020 census, Page had a population of 7,440.

== History ==
Page was founded in 1957 as a housing community for workers and their families during the construction of nearby Glen Canyon Dam on the Colorado River. Its 17-square-mile (44 km^{2}) site was obtained in a land exchange with the Navajo Nation. The city is perched atop Manson Mesa at an elevation of 4,300 feet (1,300 m) above sea level and 600 feet (180 m) above Lake Powell.

The city was originally called Government Camp, but was later named for John C. Page, commissioner of the Bureau of Reclamation, 1936–1943.

After the dam was completed in 1966, Page officially incorporated as a town on March 1, 1975. The city grew steadily to today's population over 7,000. Because of the new roads and bridge built for use during construction, it has become the gateway to the Glen Canyon National Recreation Area and Lake Powell, attracting more than 3 million visitors per year. Page is also the home of two of the largest electrical generation units in the western United States. Glen Canyon Dam has a 1,288,000-kilowatt capacity when fully online. The other power plant to the southeast is the Navajo Generating Station, which ceased operations in 2019. It was a coal-fired steam plant with an output capability of 2,250,000 kilowatts. On December 18, 2020, the three smokestacks of the Navajo Generating Station were demolished.

In 1997, Antelope Canyon was opened to tourism on Navajo land adjacent to Page. This natural slot canyon, formed by erosion, created an increased tourism for Page.

== Geography ==
According to the United States Census Bureau, the city has a total area of 16.6 square miles (43 km^{2}), of which 16.6 square miles (43 km^{2}) are land and 0.04 square miles (0.10 km^{2}), or 0.12%, is water.

=== Climate ===
Page has an arid climate (Köppen BWk) with hot, very dry summers and chilly winters with very little snow. It is located in the southern edge of the Great Basin Desert on the Colorado Plateau. It is very dry due to being in the rainshadow of the mountains of California and too far north to get consistent North American monsoons.

Climate data for Page, Arizona (1991–2020 normals, extremes 1997–present)
Month	Jan	Feb	Mar	Apr	May	Jun	Jul	Aug	Sep	Oct	Nov	Dec	Year
Record high °F (°C)	65 (18)	75 (24)	89 (32)	93 (34)	102 (39)	110 (43)	111 (44)	108 (42)	105 (41)	96 (36)	78 (26)	69 (21)	111 (44)
Mean maximum °F (°C)	56.8 (13.8)	64.6 (18.1)	77.3 (25.2)	85.8 (29.9)	95.0 (35.0)	102.7 (39.3)	105.7 (40.9)	101.3 (38.5)	96.5 (35.8)	86.1 (30.1)	69.8 (21.0)	57.5 (14.2)	106.2 (41.2)
Mean daily maximum °F (°C)	44.6 (7.0)	51.3 (10.7)	61.8 (16.6)	70.5 (21.4)	80.7 (27.1)	92.2 (33.4)	96.5 (35.8)	93.5 (34.2)	84.9 (29.4)	70.9 (21.6)	55.2 (12.9)	43.8 (6.6)	70.5 (21.4)
Daily mean °F (°C)	35.5 (1.9)	40.8 (4.9)	49.7 (9.8)	57.4 (14.1)	67.1 (19.5)	77.8 (25.4)	83.1 (28.4)	80.5 (26.9)	72.1 (22.3)	58.8 (14.9)	44.9 (7.2)	35.4 (1.9)	58.6 (14.8)
Mean daily minimum °F (°C)	26.4 (−3.1)	30.4 (−0.9)	37.6 (3.1)	44.4 (6.9)	53.6 (12.0)	63.4 (17.4)	69.7 (20.9)	67.6 (19.8)	59.4 (15.2)	46.8 (8.2)	34.5 (1.4)	26.9 (−2.8)	46.7 (8.2)
Mean minimum °F (°C)	19.6 (−6.9)	22.7 (−5.2)	29.8 (−1.2)	36.1 (2.3)	43.9 (6.6)	54.5 (12.5)	64.8 (18.2)	62.6 (17.0)	50.8 (10.4)	37.6 (3.1)	26.1 (−3.3)	19.1 (−7.2)	17.3 (−8.2)
Record low °F (°C)	−11 (−24)	6 (−14)	18 (−8)	25 (−4)	31 (−1)	44 (7)	56 (13)	46 (8)	40 (4)	24 (−4)	16 (−9)	1 (−17)	−11 (−24)
Average precipitation inches (mm)	0.65 (17)	0.51 (13)	0.54 (14)	0.38 (9.7)	0.44 (11)	0.13 (3.3)	0.58 (15)	0.93 (24)	0.93 (24)	0.92 (23)	0.45 (11)	0.42 (11)	6.88 (176)
Average snowfall inches (cm)	1.4 (3.6)	0.4 (1.0)	0.2 (0.51)	0.1 (0.25)	0.0 (0.0)	0.0 (0.0)	0.0 (0.0)	0.0 (0.0)	0.0 (0.0)	0.0 (0.0)	0.0 (0.0)	1.0 (2.5)	3.1 (7.86)
Average precipitation days (≥ 0.01 in)	4.1	5.3	4.5	3.6	2.7	1.4	3.5	6.5	4.6	4.1	2.9	4.2	47.4
Average snowy days (≥ 0.1 in)	0.8	0.2	0.2	0.0	0.0	0.0	0.0	0.0	0.0	0.0	0.0	0.6	1.8
Source 1: NOAA
Source 2: National Weather Service

== Demographics ==
Historical population
Census	Pop.	Note	%±
1960	2,960		—
1970	1,439		−51.4%
1980	4,907		241.0%
1990	6,598		34.5%
2000	6,809		3.2%
2010	7,247		6.4%
2020	7,440		2.7%
U.S. Decennial Census

=== Racial and ethnic composition ===
Page city, Arizona – Racial composition Note: the US Census treats Hispanic/Latino as an ethnic category. This table excludes Latinos from the racial categories and assigns them to a separate category. Hispanics/Latinos may be of any race.
Race (NH = Non-Hispanic)	2020	2010	2000	1990	1980
White alone (NH)	43.3% (3,221)	54% (3,915)	65.4% (4,450)	70.8% (4,673)	79.9% (3,923)
Black alone (NH)	0.6% (46)	0.3% (24)	0.4% (27)	0.5% (35)	2.1% (101)
American Indian alone (NH)	39.8% (2,961)	33.2% (2,408)	26.4% (1,795)	22.9% (1,511)	13.6% (667)
Asian alone (NH)	1.6% (121)	0.8% (60)	0.7% (45)	0.7% (48)	0.2% (9)
Pacific Islander alone (NH)	0.2% (12)	0% (2)	0.2% (13)		
Other race alone (NH)	0.3% (25)	0.2% (11)	0% (0)	0% (2)	0.2% (8)
Multiracial (NH)	5.4% (404)	4.2% (301)	2.3% (159)	—	—
Hispanic/Latino (any race)	8.7% (650)	7.3% (526)	4.7% (320)	5% (329)	4.1% (199)

=== 2020 census ===
As of the 2020 census, Page had a population of 7,440. The median age was 32.9 years. 27.9% of residents were under the age of 18 and 12.9% of residents were 65 years of age or older. For every 100 females, there were 100.6 males, and for every 100 females age 18 and over, there were 97.5 males age 18 and over.

94.4% of residents lived in urban areas, while 5.6% lived in rural areas.

There were 2,580 households in Page, of which 39.0% had children under the age of 18 living in them. Of all households, 43.2% were married-couple households, 20.1% were households with a male householder and no spouse or partner present, and 26.6% were households with a female householder and no spouse or partner present. About 23.1% of all households were made up of individuals, and 9.6% had someone living alone who was 65 years of age or older.

There were 2,992 housing units, of which 13.8% were vacant. The homeowner vacancy rate was 0.6% and the rental vacancy rate was 7.3%.

The most reported ancestries in 2020 were:

- Navajo (40.8%)
- English (13%)
- German (10.7%)
- Irish (8.3%)
- Mexican (6.7%)
- Scottish (2.2%)
- French (1.6%)
- Italian (1.5%)
- Norwegian (1.1%)
- Swedish (1%)

=== 2010 census ===
As of the 2010 census, 7,247 people, 2,518 households, and 1,822 families resided in the city. The population density was 426.3 inhabitants per square mile (164.6/km^{2}). The 2,787 housing units averaged 163.9 per square mile (63.3/km^{2}). The racial makeup of the city was 57.6% White, 0.3% African American, 34.0% Native American, 0.9% Asian, 2.1% from other races, and 5.0% from two or more races. About 7.3% of the population was Hispanic or Latino of any race.

Of the 2,518 households, 40.6% had children under the age of 18 living with them, 51.9% were married couples living together, 12.9% had a female householder with no husband present, and 27.6% were not families. Around 20.7% of all households were made up of individuals, and 7.7% had someone living alone who was 65 years of age or older. The average household size was 2.87, and the average family size was 3.32.

In the city, the population was distributed as 29.6% under the age of 18, 10.4% from 18 to 24, 26.2% from 25 to 44, 26.0% from 45 to 64, and 9% who were 65 years of age or older. The median age was 32.5 years. For every 100 females, there were 101.5 males. For every 100 females age 18 and over, there were 100.9 males.

=== Income and poverty ===
As of the 2015 American Community Survey, the median income for a household in the city was $57,161, and for a family was $64,135. Males had a median full-time income of $47,779 versus $37,656 for females. The per capita income for the city was $24,338. About 14.1% of families and 14.4% of the population were below the poverty line, including 18.7% of those under age 18 and 1.5% of those age 65 or over.

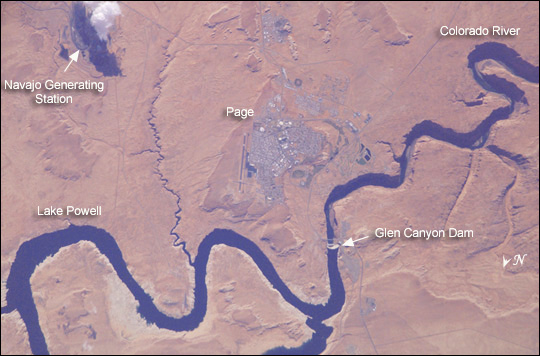
Satellite photo showing Page, Lake Powell, Glen Canyon Dam, Navajo Generating Station, and the Colorado River

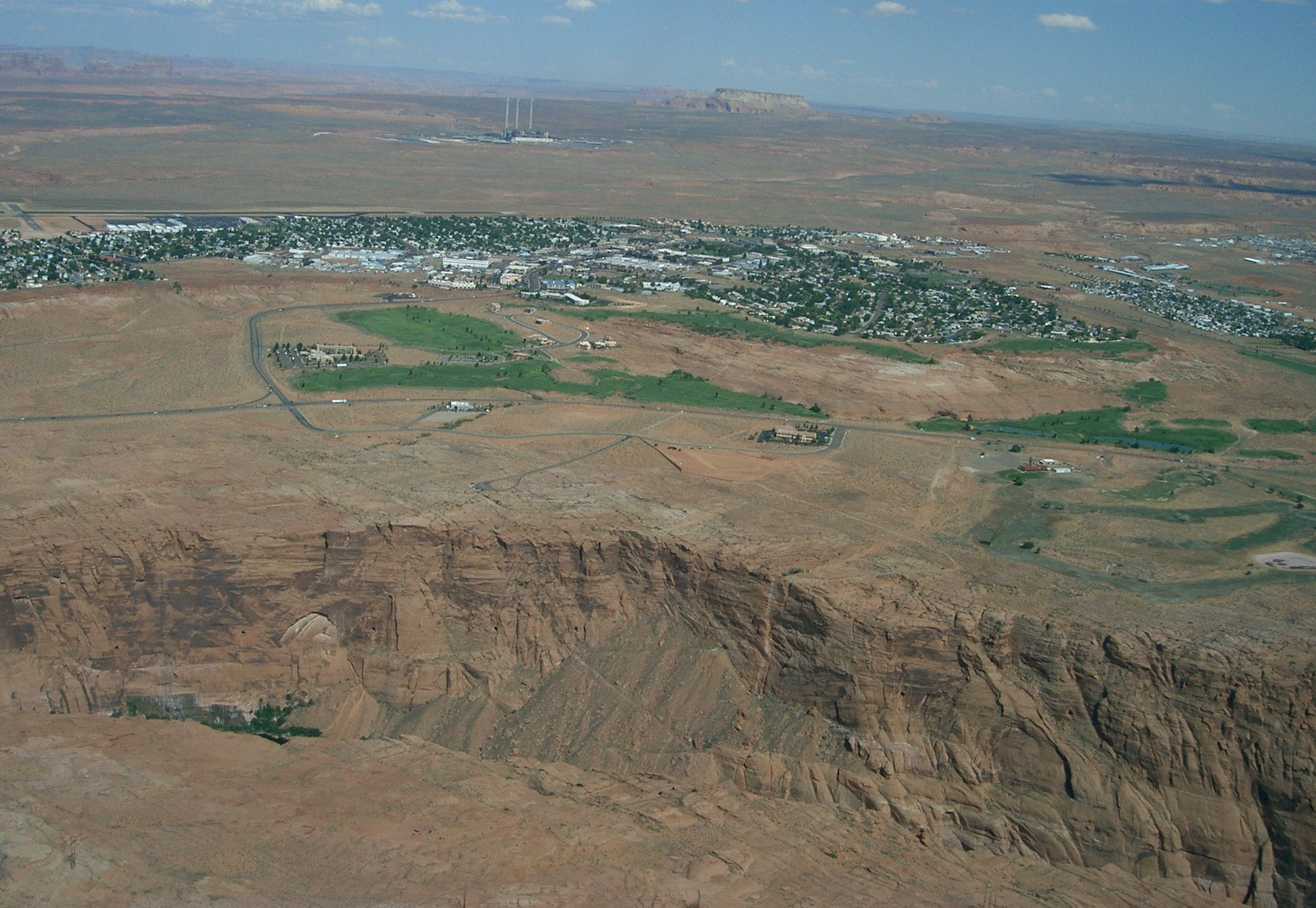
Aerial view of Page

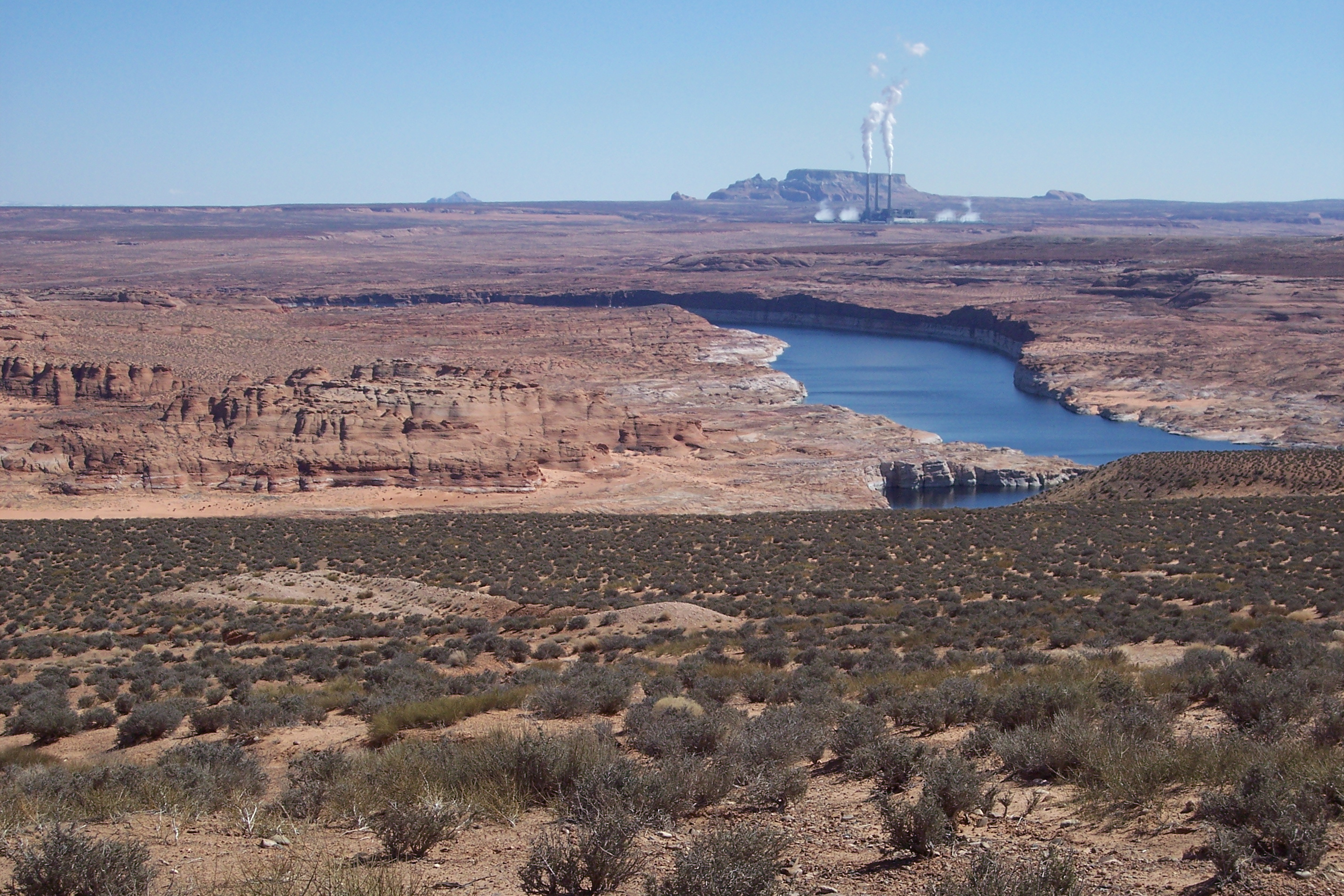
Colorado River, Page city area on the right and Navajo Generating Station in the background

== Economy ==
=== Top employers ===
According to Page's 2023 Annual Comprehensive Financial Report, the top employers in the city are:

#	Employer	# of Employees
1	Aramark	1,100
2	Page Unified School District	532
3	Walmart	222
4	National Park Service	200
5	City of Page	181
6	Infinity of Page Home Health Services Llc	150
7	Banner Health	135
8	GSM Outdoors	122
9	Page Steel Inc	87
10	Canyonlands Community Health Care Inc	77

== Education ==
Much of Page is served by the Page Unified School District. The public schools are Lake View Primary School; Desert View Intermediate School, Page Middle School, Page High School, Manson Mesa High School, and Tse Yaato High School. The Glen Canyon Outdoor Academy is the only charter school.

Portions of Page are in the Fredonia-Moccasin Unified School District.

== Media ==
- KNAD 91.7 NPR repeater station.
- KXAZ 93.3 Page
- KPLD 105.1 Kanab
- KPGE 1340 AM

The Lake Powell Chronicle is the weekly newspaper in Page.

The 2001 movie Evolution was filmed in Page.

== Infrastructure ==
=== Transportation ===
Page is located on U.S. Route 89. Arizona State Route 98 heads east into the Navajo Reservation.

Public transportation is provided by Helping Hands Agency, a local nonprofit, under the name Express, with service extending to Tuba City, Cameron, Shonto, and Wahweap.

National Park Express provides a daily shuttle between Page and Las Vegas and Page and Grand Canyon Village.

Page Municipal Airport serves Page with scheduled, charter, and general aviation.

== Notable people ==
- Matt Haryasz, professional basketball player
- Fred Keller, politician
- Mary Antonia Wood, artist
