= Buckskin Mountain (Arizona-Utah) =

Landform in Coconino County, Arizona and Kane County, Utah

- Location within the United States

Highest point
- Elevation: 6,668 ft (2,032 m)
- Coordinates: 36°58′33″N 112°06′16″W

Dimensions
- Length: 15 mi (24 km) NNE–SSW

Geography
- Country: United States
- States: Arizona and Utah
- Regions: Kaibab Plateau and Vermilion Cliffs
- Counties: Coconino County, AZ and Kane County, UT
- Borders on: White Cliffs, Vermilion Cliffs, Grand Staircase–Escalante, Coyote Buttes, Paria Plateau, Cooper Ridge, Kaibab Plateau and Kanab Plateau
- Topo map: USGS Buckskin Mountain

Buckskin Mountain is a 16-mile (26 km) mountain ridge that spans from Coconino County, Arizona, to Kane County, Utah in the United States, that is divided almost equally between the two counties.

== Description ==
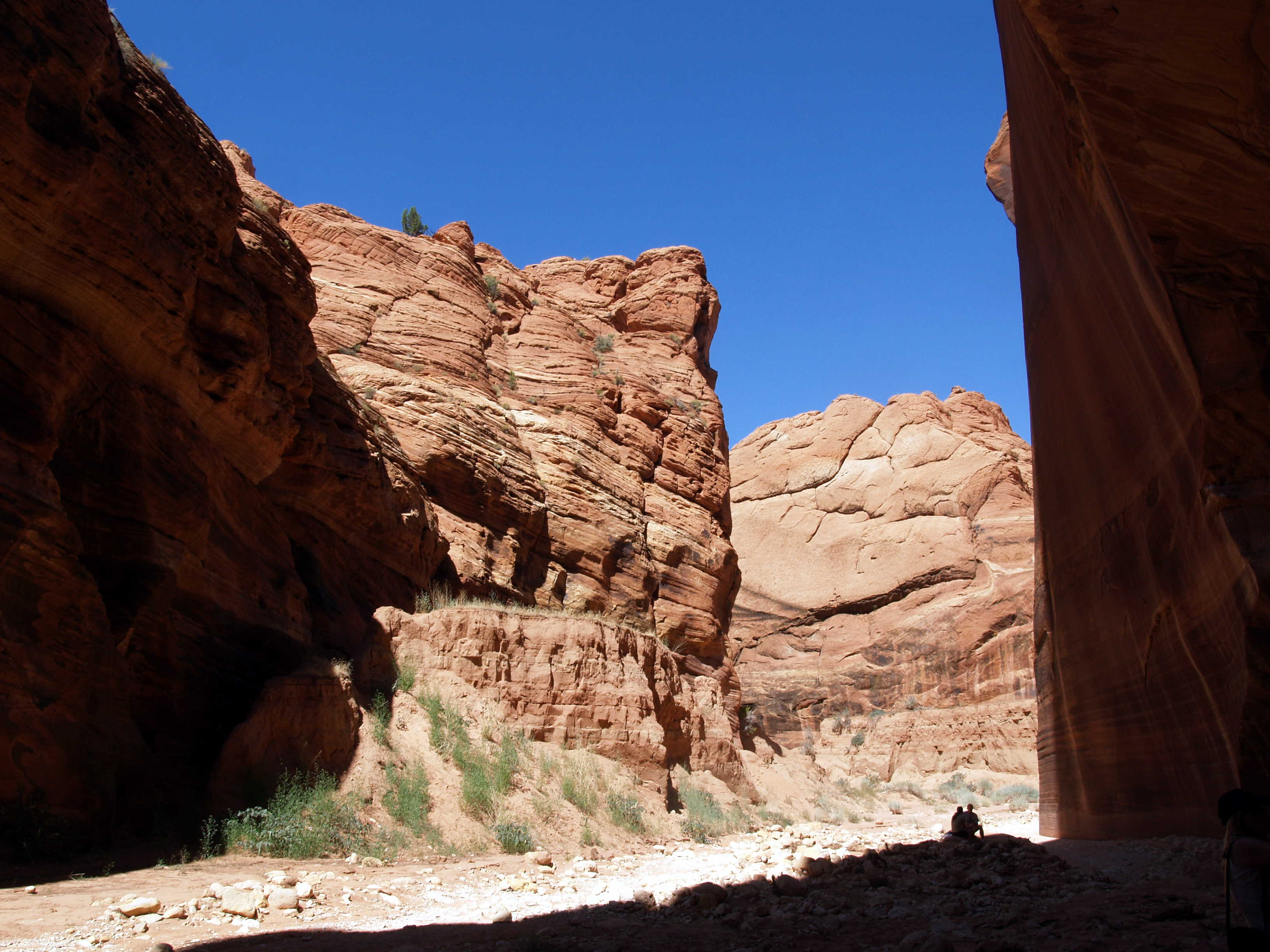
Buckskin Gulch region at the northeast end of Buckskin Mountain, August 2009

The ridge lies at the north end of the Kaibab Plateau, of the North Rim of the Grand Canyon; the Kanab and Paria plateaus of Arizona lie southwest and southeast. Buckskin Mountain borders the Vermilion Cliffs National Monument, southeast. The north portion of the ridge in Utah was located in the Grand Staircase–Escalante National Monument, but was in one of the sections that was later removed from the monument. The northeast ridge terminus is Buckskin Gulch. To the ridge's east, across the narrow Coyote Valley, of the north-flowing Coyote Wash, lies the Coyote Buttes of Arizona. The ridge trends approximately north-northeast and descends steeply on its southeast flank to Coyote Wash. The ridge's highpoint is located just south of the state border in Arizona at 6,668 feet (2,032 m).

Before 1989, the United States Geological Survey (USGS) had identified three different mountains in the area named Buckskin Mountain: two in northern Coconino County, Arizona. and one near the southern edge of central Kane County, Utah. While the USGS database still lists all three, a decision card for one of the Coconino County landforms, dated February 9, 1989, indicates two significant changes. First, it defined the landform as a ridge, rather than a summit. Second, it provided a description (with associated coordinates) that ran from the Rock Canyon immediately north of the border of the Kaibab National Forest, northeasterly to the western part of the Kaibab Gulch (also known as Buckskin Gulch). This new description and the new coordinates encompass the locations of the three summits, effectively combining the three into a single landform.

== Access ==
The northeast, east, and south of Buckskin Mountain can be accessed from U.S. Route 89A (US 89A) from House Rock, Arizona, via the House Rock Road (BLM Road 1065). The road is almost due-north trending, and in Utah, the road becomes the House Rock Valley Road, connecting to U.S. Route 89 (US‑89), 17 miles (27 km) west of Big Water.

Regions around the west and northwest of Buckskin Mountain can be accessed from Kanab, and Canyon Point, Utah, 8 miles (13 km) east of Kanab, on US‑89. At the ridge's northwest flank, US‑89 turns northeasterly, with access by unimproved roads.

The unimproved routes on the west and southeast also connect to an improved route at the south terminus of the ridge. The route comes from House Rock Valley Road, east, and its west route terminus, at US 89A, 7 miles (11 km) east of Fredonia, Arizona.
