= Vermilion Cliffs =

Landform in Utah and Arizona in the United States

Coordinates: 36°48′23″N 111°44′28″W

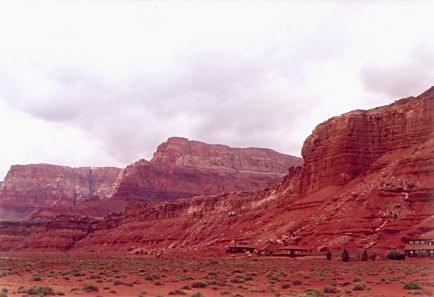
Vermilion Cliffs, view from Glen Canyon near Lee's Ferry.

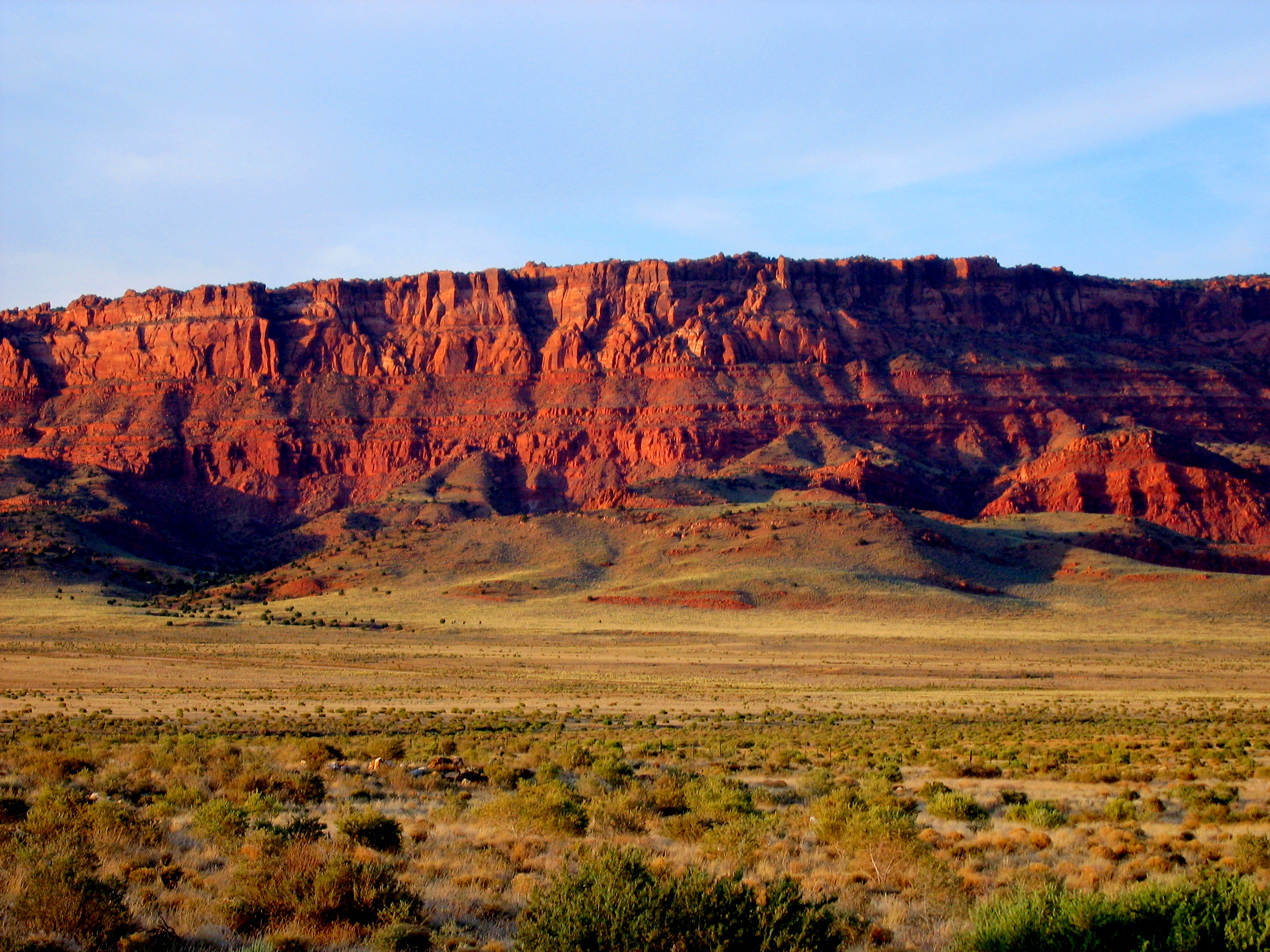
Vermilion Cliffs — view from Arizona Hwy 89.

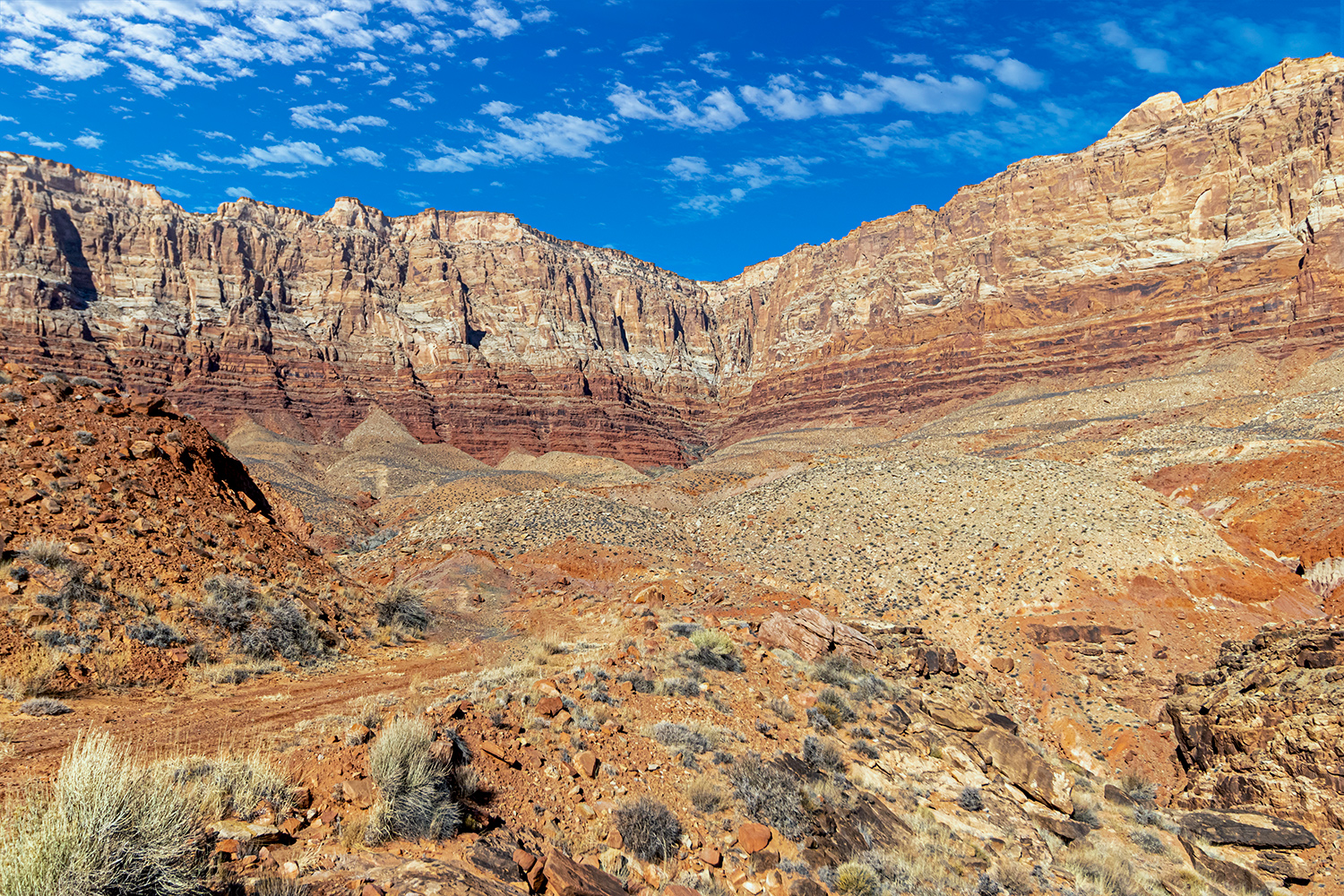
The Vermilion Cliffs Close Up

The Vermilion Cliffs are the second "step" up in the five-step Grand Staircase of the Colorado Plateau, in northern Arizona and southern Utah in the southwestern United States. They extend west from near Page, Arizona, for a considerable distance, in both Arizona and Utah.

In 1984, 112,500 acres (45,500 ha) of the region were designated as the Paria Canyon-Vermilion Cliffs Wilderness. An even greater area was protected within Vermilion Cliffs National Monument in 2000.

== Geology ==
The Vermilion Cliffs are composed of the resistant red sandstone beds of the Lower Jurassic Moenave and Kayenta Formations. They are made up of deposited silt and desert dunes, cemented by infiltrated carbonates and intensely colored by red iron oxide and other minerals, particularly bluish manganese. They are in the physiographic High Plateaus Section and Canyon Lands Section of the Colorado Plateau Province.

== History ==
The Vermilion Cliffs were on an important route from Utah to Arizona used by settlers during the 19th Century. The area was explored by the Mormon pioneer and missionary Jacob Hamblin, who started a ranch at the base of the cliffs in House Rock Valley. Present day U.S. Highway 89A basically follows the old wagon route past the cliffs through House Rock Valley and up the Kaibab Plateau to Jacob Lake.

Famous locations in the cliff area include Lee's Ferry, Glen Canyon and the Glen Canyon National Recreation Area, The Wave, Coyote Buttes, and others.

== Geography ==
Reddish or vermilion-colored cliffs are found along U.S. Highway 89A near Navajo Bridge, and may be seen from U.S. Highway 89 close to Bitter Springs. Highway 89A runs alongside the Vermilion Cliffs for most of its route between Jacob Lake and Marble Canyon, and offers a great view of the cliffs.

In the spring, after a good winter rain, the valley between Highway 89 and the Vermilion Cliffs will be covered with a carpet of desert mallow and other spring flowers.

In the image below, Highway 89A is atop the yellow rocks capping the first step of the series, the Chocolate Cliffs, and will turn east (to the right) upon entry to the valley below, ultimately crossing the Colorado River at Marble Canyon via the Navajo Bridge.

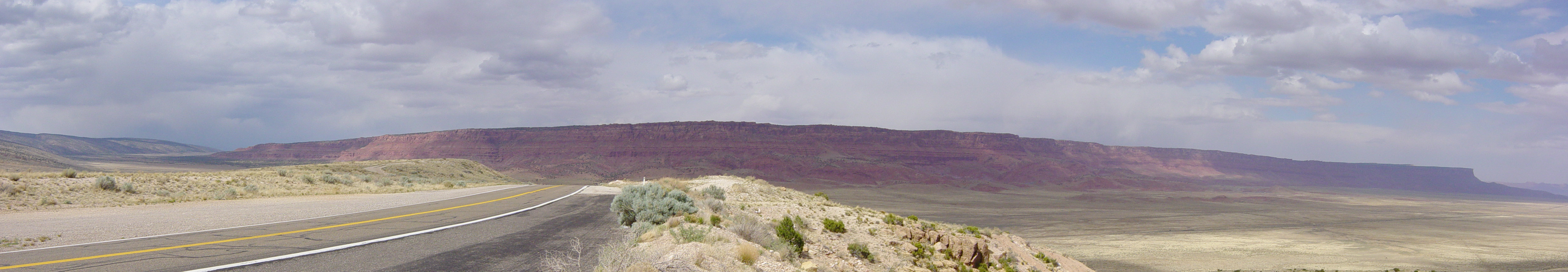
Panoramic view north from Highway 89A

== See also ==
- Vermilion Cliffs National Monument
- Paria Canyon-Vermilion Cliffs Wilderness
- California condor – Vermilion Cliffs are a release site.
