= The Wave (Arizona) =

Rock formation in the Vermilion Cliffs National Monument in Arizona, US

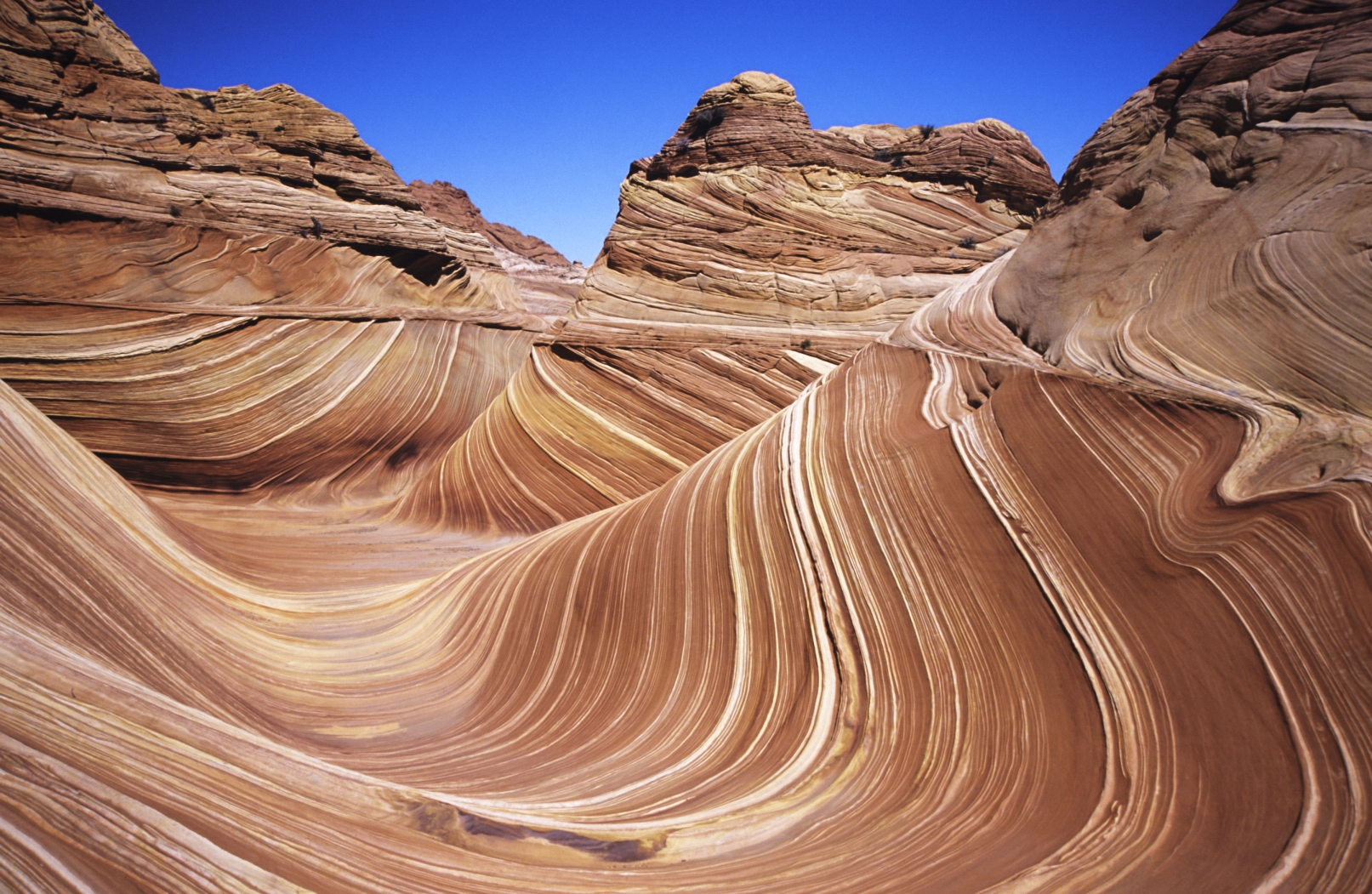

Highest point
- Elevation: 5,225 ft (1,593 m)
- Coordinates: 36.9961°N 112.0061°W

Geography
- Location within Arizona
- Location: Coconino County, Arizona, U.S.

Geology
- Rock age: Jurassic

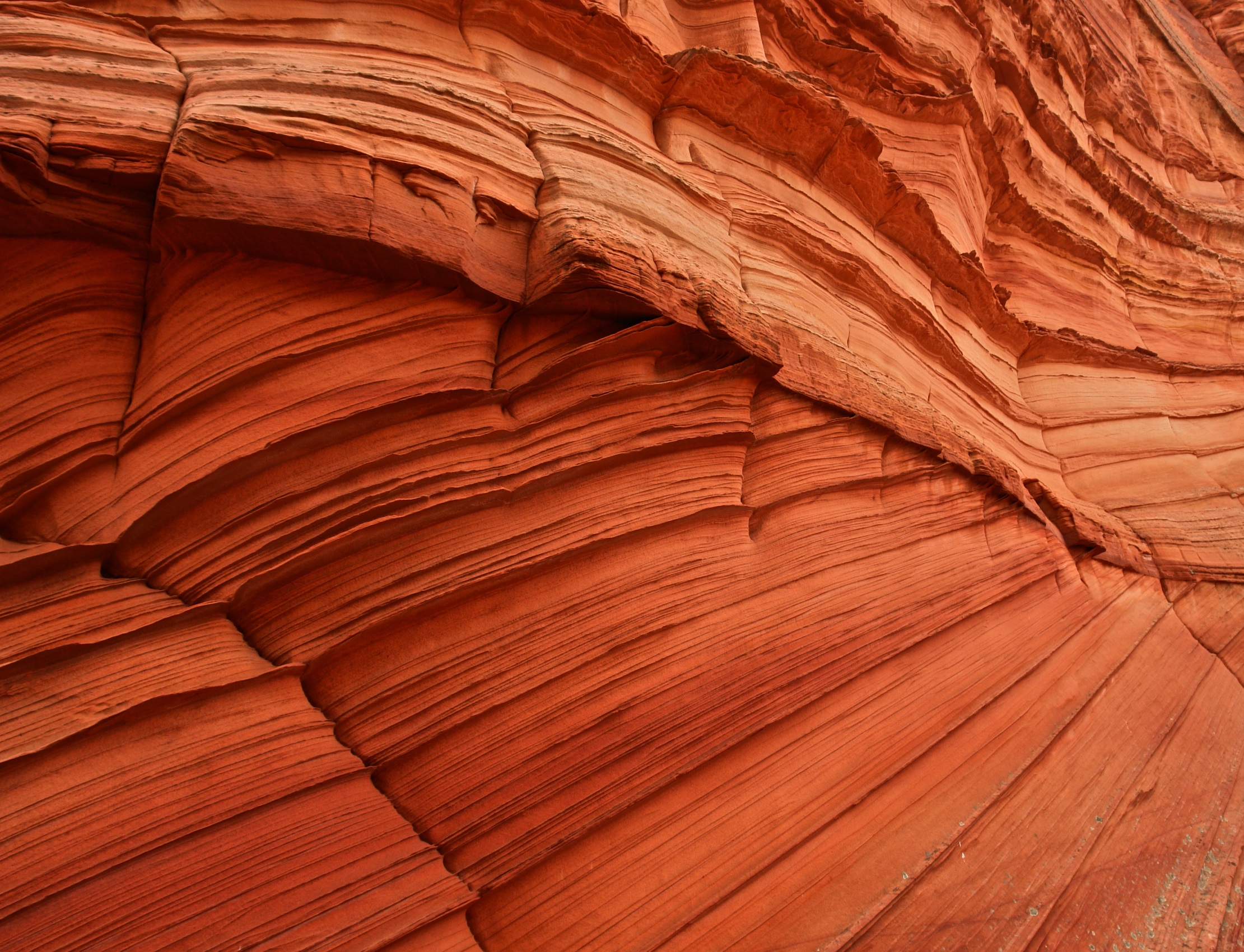
Thin ridges created by the erosion of differentially cemented, large-scale eolian cross bedding within Navajo sandstone

The Wave is a sandstone rock formation located in Arizona, US, near its northern border with Utah. The formation is situated on the slopes of the Coyote Buttes in the Paria Canyon-Vermilion Cliffs Wilderness of the Colorado Plateau. The area is administered by the Bureau of Land Management (BLM) at the Grand Staircase–Escalante National Monument visitor center in Kanab, Utah.

The formation is well known among hikers and photographers for its colorful, undulating forms and the difficult hike required to reach it. Due to the fragile nature of the formation and the large number of people wishing to visit it, a daily lottery system is used to dispense permits for up to 16 people and/or 4 groups (whichever comes first) two days before (visitors must apply within a geofence area encompassing the greater Kanab visitor center, Vermilion Cliffs, and Page areas). Additionally, 48 online permits (for people and/or groups, whichever comes first) are available 4 months in advance of a planned trip. A map and information about the hike are supplied to those who have obtained permits.

== Geology ==
The Wave consists of intersecting U-shaped troughs that have been eroded into Navajo Sandstone of Jurassic age. The two major troughs which comprise this rock formation are 62 feet (19 m) wide by 118 feet (36 m) long and 7 feet (2 m) wide by 52 feet (16 m) long. Initially, infrequent runoff eroded these troughs along joints within the Navajo Sandstone. After their formation, the drainage basin, which fed rainwater to these troughs, shrank to the point that the runoff became insufficient to contribute to the cutting of these troughs. As a result, the troughs are now almost exclusively eroded by wind, as indicated by the orientation of erosional steps and risers cut into the sandstone along their steep walls. These erosional steps and risers are oriented relative to the predominant direction of the wind, as it is now naturally funneled into and through these troughs.

The Wave exposes large-scale sets of cross-bedded eolian sandstone composed of rhythmic and cyclic alternating grainflow and windripple laminae. The rhythmic, cyclic alternating laminae represent periodic changes in the prevailing winds during the Jurassic period, as large dunes migrated across a sandy desert. The thin ridges and ribbing seen within The Wave are the result of the differential erosion of rhythmic and cyclic alternating grainflow and windripple laminae within the Navajo Sandstone. These laminae have differing resistance to erosion because they have been differentially cemented according to variations in the grain size of the sand that composes them. The soft sandstone is fragile, especially the ridges and ribbing of The Wave. As a result, visitors must walk carefully to avoid breaking the small ridges.

In some areas, The Wave exposes deformed laminae within the Navajo Sandstone. These laminae were deformed before the sand lithified to form sandstone. Judging from their physical characteristics, this deformation likely represents the trampling and churning of these sands by dinosaurs after their deposition. Dinosaur tracks and the fossil burrows of desert-dwelling arthropods, such as beetles and other insects, have been found in the Navajo Sandstone within the North Coyote Buttes Wilderness Area.

== Artistic significance ==
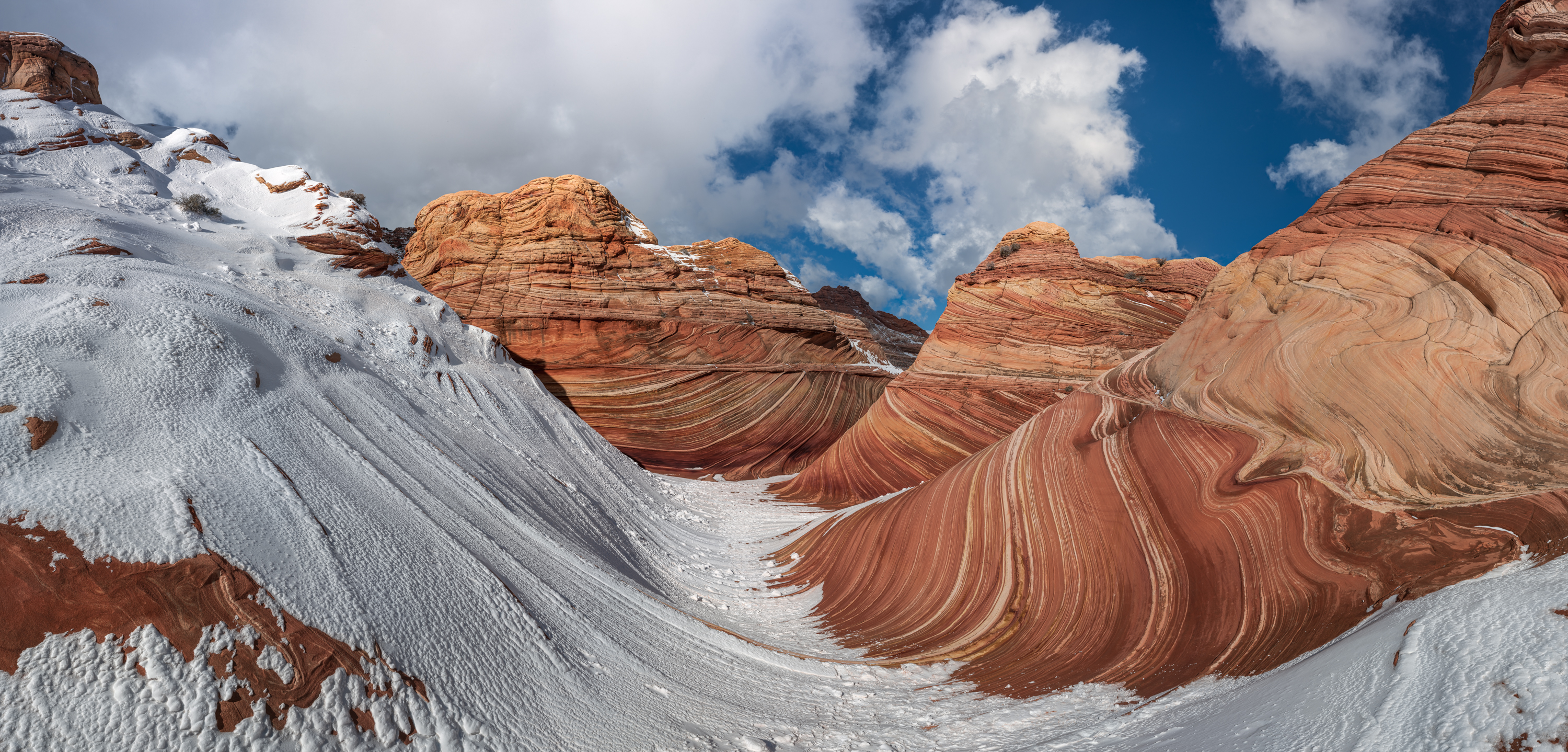
Main Wave canyon with snow, rare event during winter

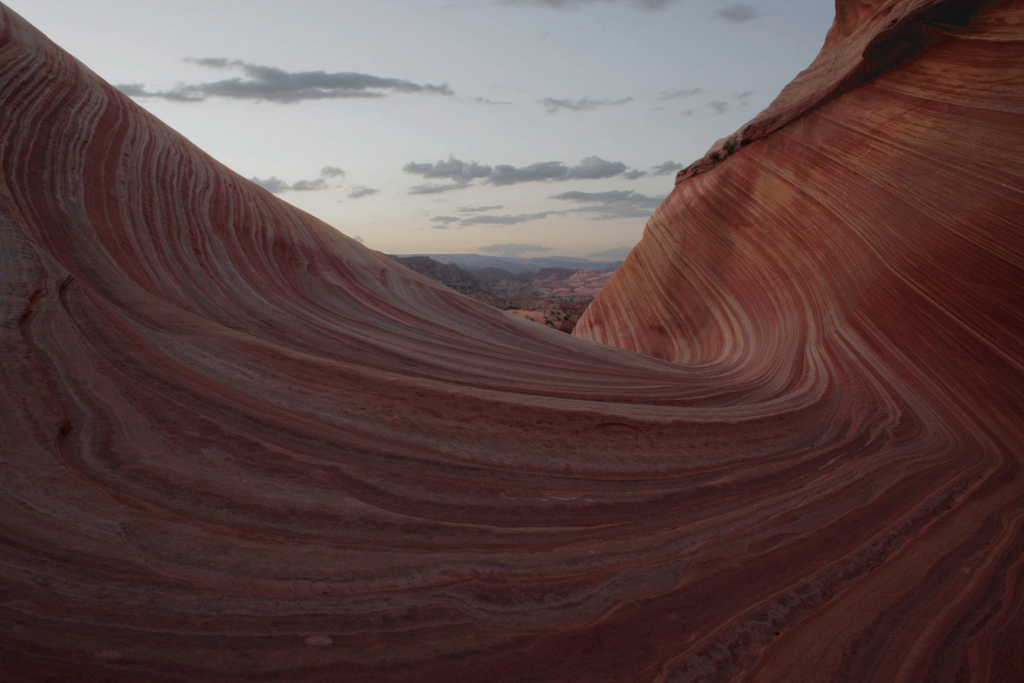
Subdued colors at evening twilight

An ideal time to photograph The Wave is the few hours around midday when there are no shadows in the center, although early morning and late afternoon shadows can also make for dramatic photos. After a rainstorm, numerous pools form, which can contain hundreds of tadpole shrimps (Lepidurus apus). These pools can be present for several days.

Above and slightly west of The Wave is what many call "the Second Wave", or "the middle Wave", which has fainter colors but is still of interest to most visitors and photographers. Hugo Martin from the Los Angeles Times said, "You can't call yourself a landscape photographer if you haven't snapped a photo or two of the Wave."

== Access policy ==
The Wave is located within the Paria Canyon-Vermilion Cliffs Wilderness. This wilderness is administered by the Bureau of Land Management (BLM), part of the United States Department of the Interior. A day-use permit from BLM is required to visit The Wave.

BLM limits access to the North Coyote Buttes Wilderness Area to just 64 permits per day. 48 of the permits are available in advance by an online lottery conducted four months before the month for which the permit is sought. The remaining 16 permits are made available by a geofenced daily lottery two days before one's intended hike. The legacy walk-in lottery has transitioned to the new Daily Lottery. While within the geofence area on a mobile device this lottery is only available by going to Recreation.gov in your browser or by installing the Recreation.gov app. Spring and autumn are the most popular times of year to visit, but the popularity of The Wave is such that the chances of obtaining a permit by either advance lottery or the day-before lottery are much less than 50% from March through November. The Wave is particularly well known among European tourists, partly because it appeared in the German documentary film Fascinating Nature (1996) and a compilation called Faszination Natur – Seven Seasons (2004).

== Access trails ==
There are four trailheads which provide access to Paria Canyon and The Wave. However, in an effort to maintain the natural integrity of the region, there are no formal trails or signage to guide hikers to The Wave from any of the trailheads. The White House trailhead is the main entrance, and the one most commonly used. The Buckskin Gulch and Wire Pass trailheads offer more experienced hikers access to Buckskin Gulch, the main tributary of Paria Canyon. The Lee's Ferry trailhead, at the lower end of Paria Canyon, is the usual exit point for hikers who travel the entire length of the canyon.

The shortest hike to The Wave begins at the Wire Pass Trailhead, about 8.3 miles (13.4 km) south of U.S. Route 89 along House Rock Valley Road, a dirt road about 35.4 miles (57.0 km) west of Page, Arizona, or 38.6 miles (62.1 km) east of Kanab, Utah, that is accessible to most vehicles in good weather. During and after a storm, the road may be impassable, even with a four-wheel-drive vehicle. The Wire Pass Trailhead includes a wide parking lot with restrooms, but no water. It is also accessible from the Arizona side by taking U.S. Route 89A from Jacob Lake on the Kaibab Plateau toward Navajo Bridge, turning north onto the House Rock Valley Road, after descending from the Kaibab. This is a longer access route over dirt road than from the Utah side.

From the Wire Pass Trailhead, The Wave can be reached by hiking approximately 3 miles (4.8 km) across open desert, making the round-trip to and from The Wave nearly 6 miles (9.7 km), climbing about 350 feet (110 m) in altitude. Although this is the shortest route, it is also a slightly more challenging hike than several of the other available routes. Temperatures in this area typically climb above 100 °F (38 °C) in the summer, so it is best to start the hike early. Anyone attempting the hike in any season is wise to be prepared for harsh desert conditions, including fierce winds, blowing sand, and little shade.

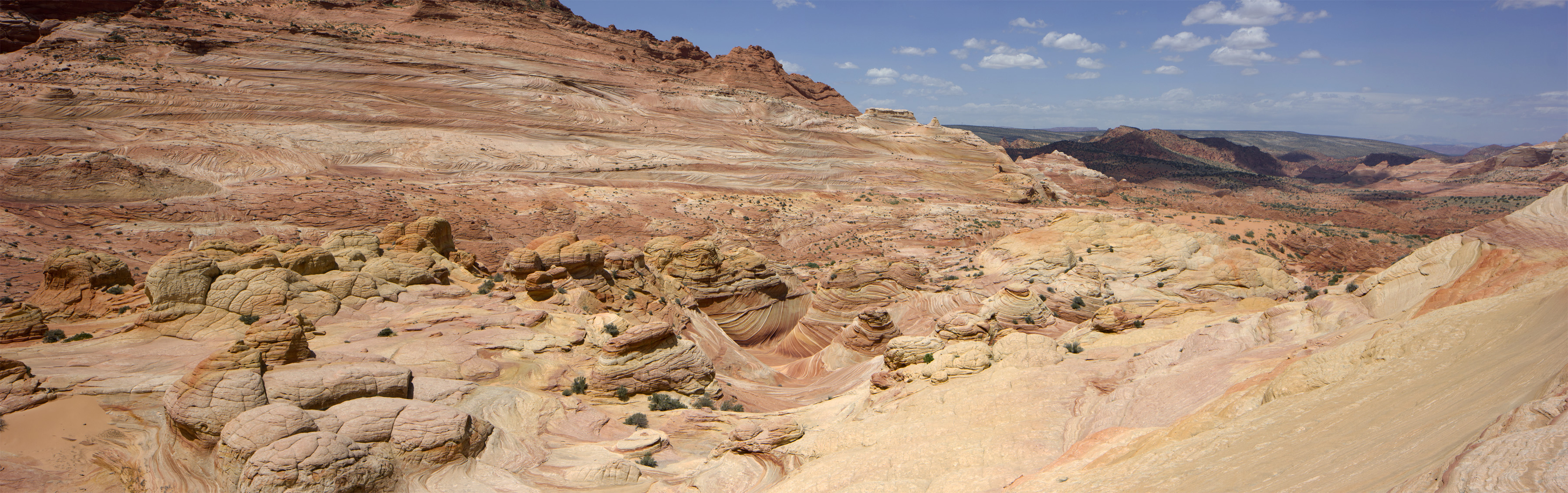
A panoramic view looking north-northwest over The Wave toward the Arizona/Utah border. The shortest route back to the Wire Pass Trailhead runs around the base of the tall sandstone ridge visible in the upper left of the photo.

The Wave can be challenging to locate due to the lack of an established, marked trail. Hikers must choose their own route across the open desert, which requires traversing exposed sandstone, dunes, and sandy wash bottoms. A formal guide sheet for navigating to The Wave is now provided to every permitted hiker by the BLM. The guide is designed for use with compass, GPS, or visual navigation. There are six checkpoints, one for each leg of the outbound hike to The Wave and the return to the trailhead. Each checkpoint includes a marked color photo of the terrain ahead, the azimuth, latitude, longitude, UTM coordinates, northing, and easting. Visitors are well advised to closely study the guide sheet before starting their hike.

While not required, the Bureau of Land Management provides a list of authorized guides for those hikers who may be uncomfortable in a wilderness situation.
