= Kanab, Utah =

City in and county seat of Kane County, Utah, United States

- City
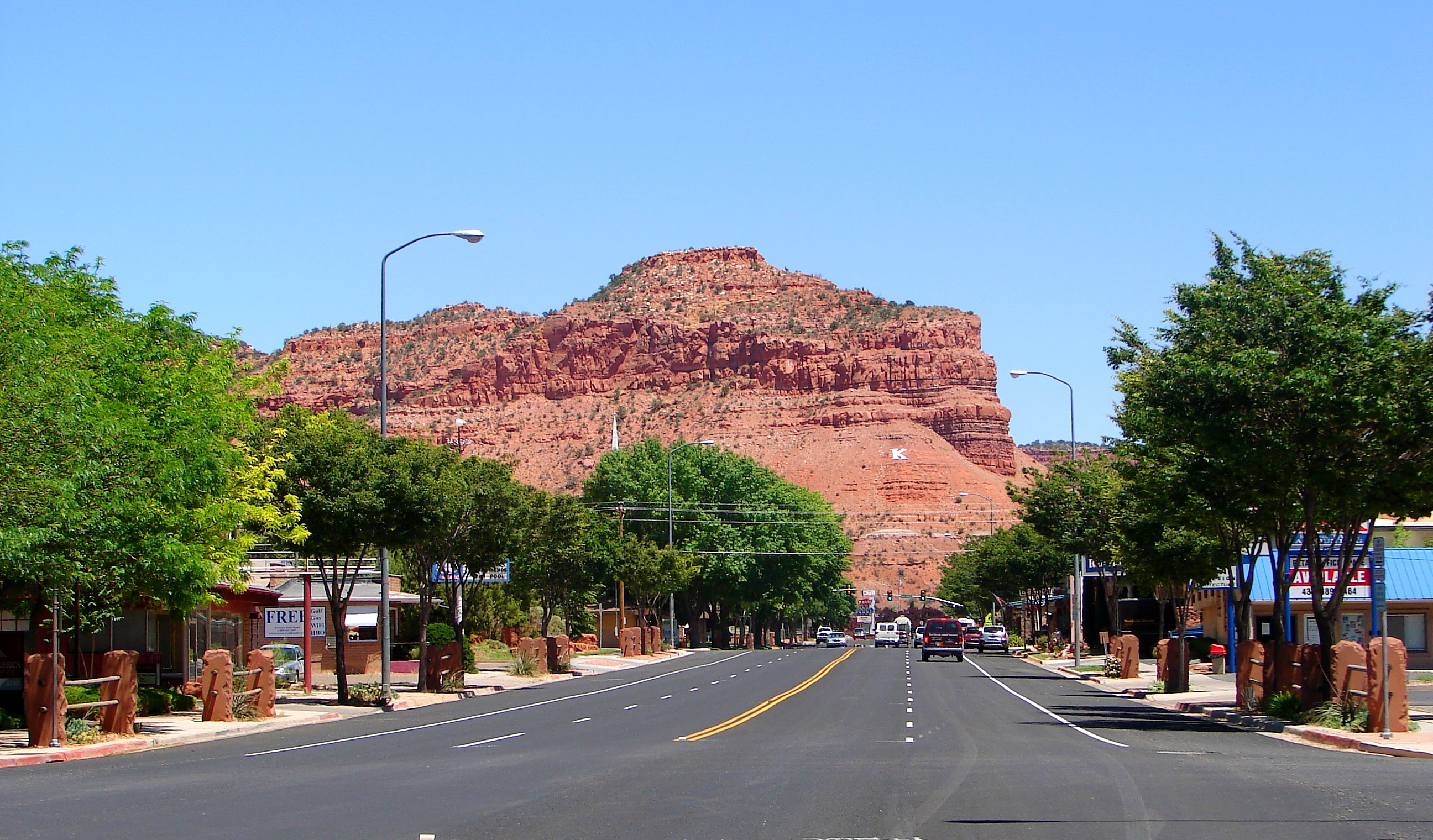
- U.S. Route 89 through Kanab, March 2013
- Nickname: Utah's Little Hollywood
- Location in Kane County and the state of Utah

- Location of Utah in the United States
- Coordinates: 37°2′8″N 112°31′52″W
- Country: United States
- State: Utah
- County: Kane
- Settled: 1870
- Incorporated: 1935
- Founder: Jacob Hamblin
- Named for: Southern Paiute for 'willow'

Government
  - Type: Council-manager
  - Mayor: Colten Johnson

Area
  - Total: 14.47 sq mi (37.48 km^{2})
  - Land: 14.44 sq mi (37.39 km^{2})
  - Water: 0.035 sq mi (0.09 km^{2})
- Elevation: 4,970 ft (1,515 m)

Population (2020)
  - Total: 4,683
  - Density: 324.4/sq mi (125.2/km^{2})
- Time zone: UTC-7 (Mountain (MST))
  - Summer (DST): UTC-6 (MDT)
- ZIP code: 84741
- Area code: 435
- FIPS code: 49-39920
- GNIS feature ID: 1429276
- Website: kanab.utah.gov

Kanab (/kəˈnæb/ kə-NAB) is a city in and the county seat of Kane County, Utah, United States. As of the 2020 census, Kanab had a population of 4,683. It is located on Kanab Creek just north of the Arizona state line.

== Description ==
The area where Kanab is located was first settled in 1864, and the town was founded in 1870 when 10 Mormon families moved into the area. Named for a Paiute word meaning "place of the willows," Fort Kanab was built on the east bank of Kanab Creek in 1864 for defense against attack and as a base for exploration of the area. The population was 4,683 at the 2020 census.

Kanab is situated in the "Grand Circle" area, centrally located among Vermilion Cliffs National Monument, Bryce Canyon National Park, the Grand Canyon (North Rim), Zion National Park, Pipe Spring National Monument, Monument Valley Navajo Tribal Park, and Lake Powell. Other nearby attractions include Grand Staircase–Escalante National Monument, Coral Pink Sand Dunes State Park, the privately owned Moqui Cave, and the largest animal sanctuary in the United States, Best Friends Animal Society.

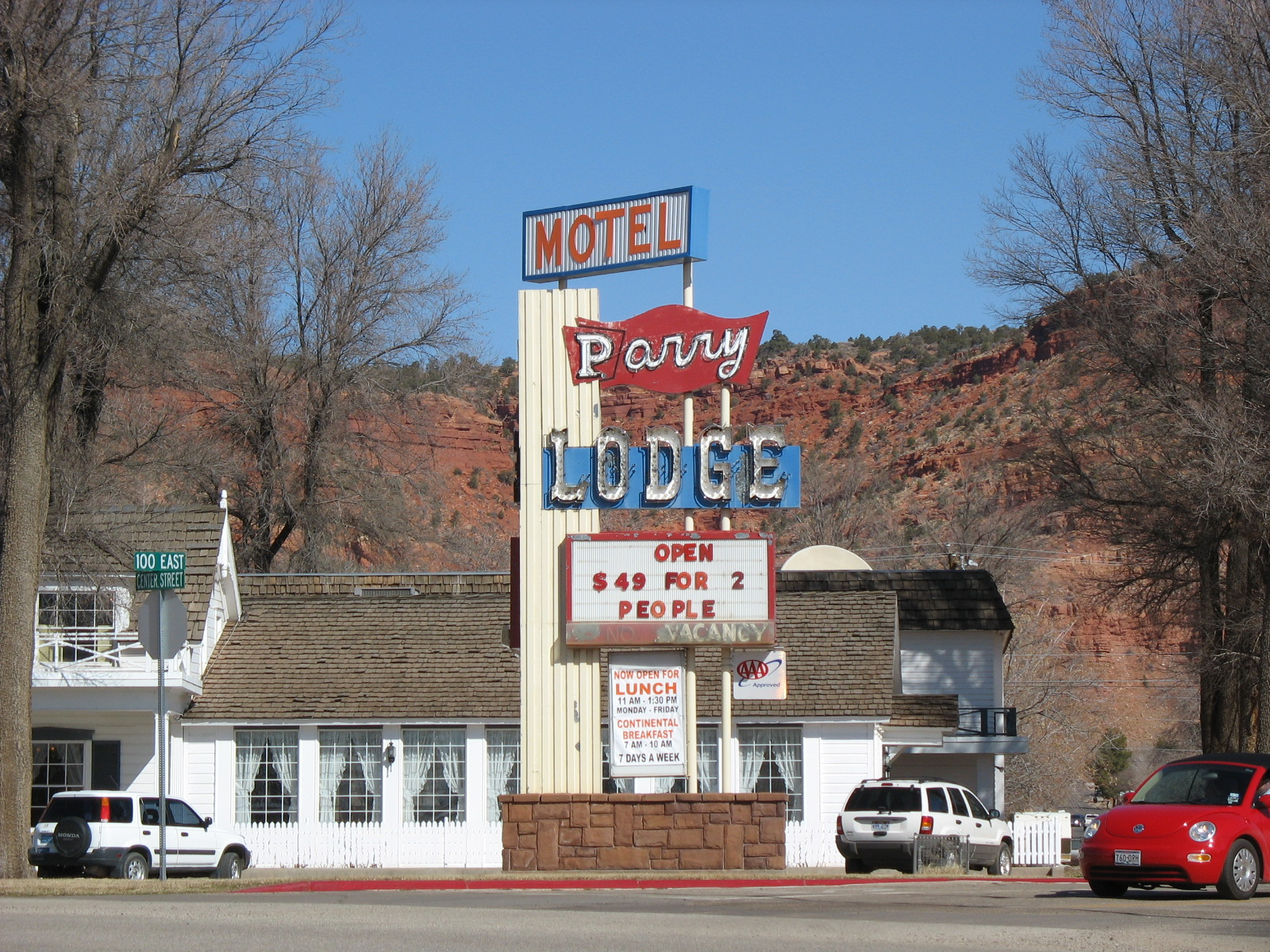
The historic Parry Lodge in Kanab, February 2009

Referring to Kanab's proximity to the many spectacular rock formations, a welcome sign to the town calls it "The Greatest Earth on Show."

Locals refer to Kanab as "Little Hollywood" due to its history as a filming location for many movies and television series, prominently Westerns such as Stagecoach (1939), The Lone Ranger, Death Valley Days. Gunsmoke, Daniel Boone, El Dorado (1966), Planet of the Apes (1968), Mackenna's Gold, WindRunner: A Spirited Journey, Western Union (1941), The Desperadoes (1943), In Old Oklahoma (1943), Buffalo Bill (1944), Westward the Women (1952), The Yellow Tomahawk (1954), Tomahawk Trail (1957), Fort Bowie (1958), Sergeants Three (1962), Duel at Diablo (1966), Ride in the Whirlwind (1965), Convict Stage (1965), The Shooting (1966), and The Outlaw Josey Wales (1976).

== Demographics ==
Historical population
Census	Pop.	Note	%±
1890	409		—
1900	710		73.6%
1910	733		3.2%
1920	1,102		50.3%
1930	1,195		8.4%
1940	1,397		16.9%
1950	1,287		−7.9%
1960	1,645		27.8%
1970	1,381		−16.0%
1980	2,148		55.5%
1990	3,289		53.1%
2000	3,564		8.4%
2010	4,312		21.0%
2020	4,683		8.6%
U.S. Decennial Census

=== Racial and ethnic composition ===
Kanab city, Utah – Racial composition Note: the US Census treats Hispanic/Latino as an ethnic category. This table excludes Latinos from the racial categories and assigns them to a separate category. Hispanics/Latinos may be of any race.
Race (NH = Non-Hispanic)	2020	2010	2000	1990	1980
White alone (NH)	90.1% (4,221)	93.2% (4,017)	95.8% (3,414)	98.1% (3,227)	98% (2,105)
Black alone (NH)	0.3% (16)	0.3% (11)	0.1% (2)	0.3% (10)	0% (0)
American Indian alone (NH)	1.1% (53)	1% (43)	0.9% (33)	0.2% (7)	1.3% (27)
Asian alone (NH)	0.9% (42)	0.3% (12)	0.3% (9)	0.2% (6)	
Pacific Islander alone (NH)	0% (0)	0% (0)	0% (1)		
Other race alone (NH)	0.2% (10)	0% (0)	0% (0)	0% (0)	
Multiracial (NH)	2.4% (112)	1.1% (49)	1.1% (38)	—	—
Hispanic/Latino (any race)	4.9% (229)	4.2% (180)	1.9% (67)	1.2% (39)	0.7% (16)

=== 2020 census ===
As of the 2020 census, Kanab had a population of 4,683. The median age was 42.0 years. 23.9% of residents were under the age of 18 and 23.9% of residents were 65 years of age or older. For every 100 females there were 98.3 males, and for every 100 females age 18 and over there were 95.3 males age 18 and over.

0.0% of residents lived in urban areas, while 100.0% lived in rural areas.

There were 1,815 households in Kanab, of which 27.1% had children under the age of 18 living in them. Of all households, 52.5% were married-couple households, 15.5% were households with a male householder and no spouse or partner present, and 27.7% were households with a female householder and no spouse or partner present. About 31.2% of all households were made up of individuals and 17.4% had someone living alone who was 65 years of age or older.

There were 2,209 housing units, of which 17.8% were vacant. The homeowner vacancy rate was 1.2% and the rental vacancy rate was 11.4%.

Racial composition as of the 2020 census
Race	Number	Percent
White	4,351	92.9%
Black or African American	19	0.4%
American Indian and Alaska Native	56	1.2%
Asian	44	0.9%
Native Hawaiian and Other Pacific Islander	0	0.0%
Some other race	28	0.6%
Two or more races	185	4.0%
Hispanic or Latino (of any race)	229	4.9%

=== 2010 census ===
As of the 2010 census, 4,312 people, 1,729 households, and 1,130 families resided in the township. The population density was 308 people per square mile (98.2/km^{2}). The 1,999 housing units had an average density of 141.8 per square mile (41.1/km^{2}). The racial makeup of the town was 96.2% White, 0.3% African American, 1.0% Native American, 0.3% Asian, 0.8% from other races, and 1.4% from two or more races. Hispanics or Latinos of any race were 4.2% of the population.

Of the 1,729 households, 25.7% had children under 18 living with them, a decrease of 6.4% compared to the 2000 census; 65.4% were married couples living together, 6.7% had a female householder with no husband present, and 34.6% were nonfamilies, an increase of 7.9% over the 2000 census. 30.9% of all households were made up of individuals, and 13% had someone living alone who was 65 or older. The average household size was 2.44 and the average family size was 3.08.

The median income for a household in the town was $42,286, and for a family was $48,008. Males had a median income of $30,018 versus $22,205 for females. 4.0% of families and 5.6% of the population were below the poverty line, including 4.6% of those under 18 and 4.9% of those 65 or over.

== Geography and climate ==
Kanab is located on the western Colorado Plateau. U.S. Routes 89 and 89A meet in the center of town. US 89 leads north 21 miles (34 km) to Orderville and southeast 74 miles (119 km) to Page, Arizona, while US 89A leads south 7 miles (11 km) to Fredonia, Arizona.

According to the United States Census Bureau, the city has a total area of 14.6 square miles (37.9 km^{2}), of which 0.03 square miles (0.09 km^{2}), or 0.24%, is covered by water. The city's downtown sits on flat ground to the east of Kanab Creek, which flows south to meet the Colorado River in the Grand Canyon.

Kanab has a borderline semiarid climate (Köppen BSk), more typical of exposed regions around Arizona's Mogollon Rim. The town is rather wetter, especially during the winter, and hotter than the typical Mountain West cool, semiarid climate. The dry spring season from April to June is warm to hot during the day and very clear, but the hot sun and thin air typical of Utah mean that nights remain cool and frosts can occur even in May. In the summer, monsoon thunderstorms break up the dry weather between July and October. The winters are mild during the day and cold at night, but get more snow than most places in southern Utah. Snowfall varies a considerably from year to year, with some years receiving almost none to 74.5 inches (189 cm) falling in 2001. On average, 70.9 days will reach 90 °F (32 °C) and 7.6 will reach 100 °F (38 °C). Although Kanab is in hardiness zone of 7A with an average yearly low of just under 5 °F (−15 °C), only 1.5 days fail to climb above freezing on average.

Climate data for Kanab, Utah 1991–2020, extremes 1899-
Month	Jan	Feb	Mar	Apr	May	Jun	Jul	Aug	Sep	Oct	Nov	Dec	Year
Record high °F (°C)	72 (22)	77 (25)	85 (29)	90 (32)	101 (38)	107 (42)	108 (42)	106 (41)	104 (40)	94 (34)	81 (27)	74 (23)	108 (42)
Mean daily maximum °F (°C)	49.4 (9.7)	54.0 (12.2)	62.2 (16.8)	69.2 (20.7)	78.2 (25.7)	89.7 (32.1)	94.2 (34.6)	91.5 (33.1)	84.8 (29.3)	72.7 (22.6)	59.3 (15.2)	48.5 (9.2)	71.1 (21.8)
Mean daily minimum °F (°C)	24.8 (−4.0)	27.8 (−2.3)	32.6 (0.3)	37.3 (2.9)	44.7 (7.1)	52.5 (11.4)	60.6 (15.9)	59.5 (15.3)	52.0 (11.1)	41.2 (5.1)	31.4 (−0.3)	24.6 (−4.1)	40.8 (4.9)
Record low °F (°C)	−20 (−29)	−12 (−24)	1 (−17)	8 (−13)	16 (−9)	23 (−5)	31 (−1)	35 (2)	24 (−4)	9 (−13)	−4 (−20)	−12 (−24)	−20 (−29)
Average precipitation inches (mm)	1.71 (43)	1.92 (49)	1.40 (36)	0.88 (22)	0.59 (15)	0.29 (7.4)	1.25 (32)	1.45 (37)	1.62 (41)	1.51 (38)	0.97 (25)	1.37 (35)	14.96 (380.4)
Average snowfall inches (cm)	5.4 (14)	5.8 (15)	1.8 (4.6)	1.8 (4.6)	0 (0)	0 (0)	0 (0)	0 (0)	0 (0)	0.2 (0.51)	1.8 (4.6)	5.3 (13)	22.1 (56.31)
Average precipitation days (≥ 0.01 inch)	6.1	6.8	5.8	5.1	4.0	2.2	5.5	6.9	4.7	4.3	3.6	5.5	60.5
Average snowy days (≥ 0.1 inch)	2.0	2.0	1.0	0.7	0	0	0	0	0	0.1	1.6	2.3	9.7
Source 1: NCEI
Source 2: Nowdata

== Transportation ==
Kanab is served by the Kanab Municipal Airport, a general aviation facility. U.S. Route 89 (US 89) passes through the city and U.S. Route 89A within Utah is entirely within the city limits and has its northern terminus at US 89.

National Park Express provides bus service from Kanab to St. George and Las Vegas.

== Jackson Flat Reservoir ==
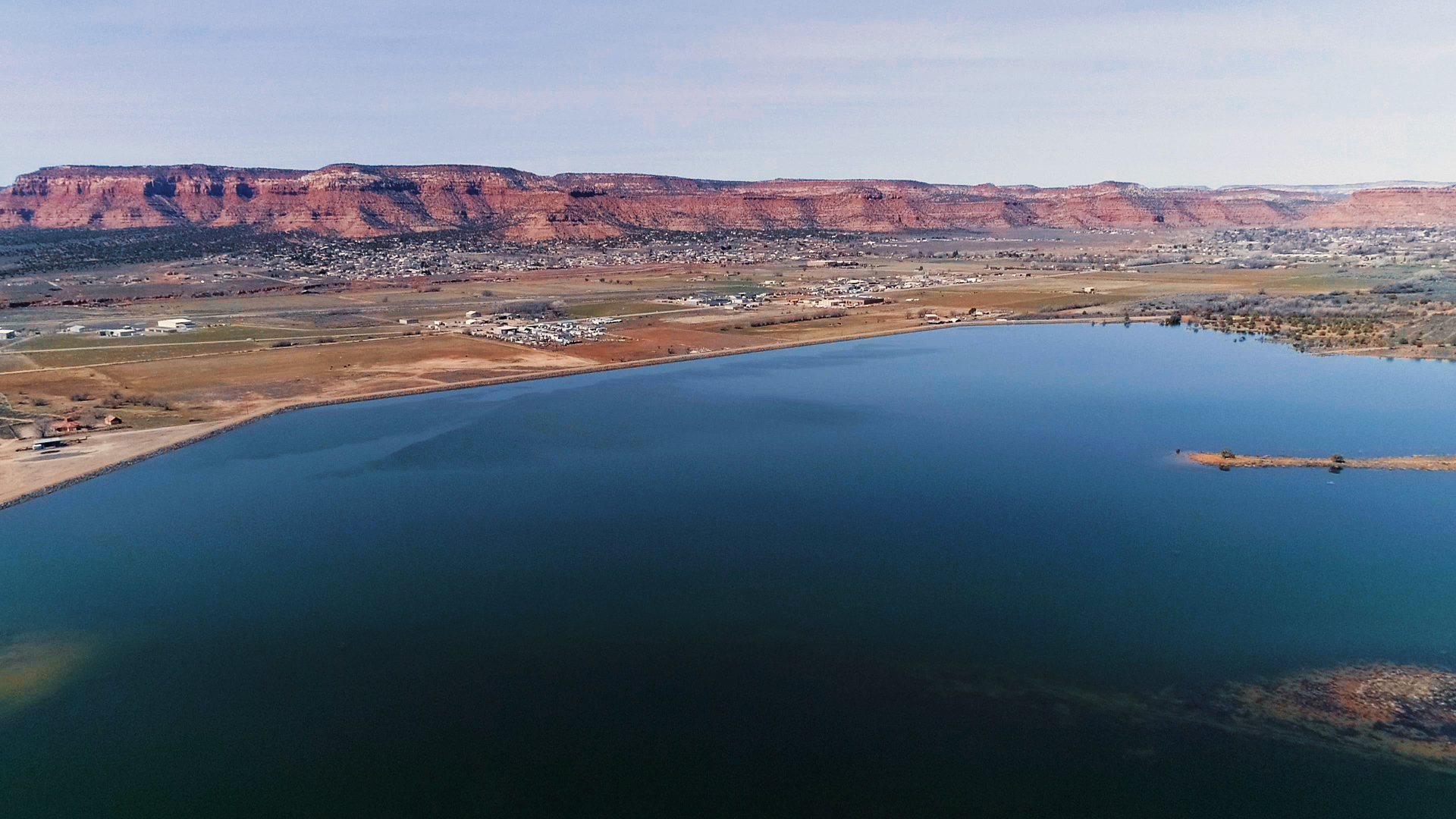
The Jackson Flat Reservoir, March 2017

In 2010, construction began on the Jackson Flat Reservoir under the direction of the Kane County Water Conservancy District. The reservoir had been in various stages of planning for 19 years. Completion of the reservoir took two years of construction, and one year of filling. The dam structure is composed of 800,000 yards of clay, dirt, and rock. The project was supervised by four engineering firms, including the Utah state engineer of Dam Safety and the Army Corps of Engineers. The 4,228 acre-feet reservoir is an off-stream site fed by a 24-inch pipe capable of transferring 23 acre-feet of water per day. The average depth of the reservoir is 28 feet (8.5 m), with a conservation pool that will sustain a 400 acre-foot pool of water. In April 2015, the reservoir reached 3,000 acre-feet of water. Water volumes vary throughout the year as reserves are tapped during summer to supplement local irrigation needs, and are then refilled during the winter based on annual rainfall. The reservoir is located directly south of Kanab, east of the municipal airport, and is visible from Highway 89A.

During planning and construction, crews discovered 10 sites of prehistoric Anasazi ruins, including human remains. Sites that would be below the water line were fully excavated and remains turned over to the local Paiute tribe for proper care and burial ceremonies. Sites above the projected water line remain unexcavated.

The Jackson Flat Reservoir has been stocked with trout, catfish, and bluegill fish varieties. The site supports nonmotorized boating, fishing, swimming, concerts, and stargazing.

== Education ==
Kane School District is the school district for the entire county. Kanab High School is in Kanab.

== Controversies ==
=== Natural Family Resolution ===
On January 10, 2006, then-mayor Kim Lawson and the city council unanimously passed Resolution 1-1-06R, titled "The Natural Family: A Vision for the City of Kanab":

On the fifth anniversary of the Sutherland Institute it was said that "words matter". They have to be followed by deeds, and you have to be prepared to communicate them clearly, vividly, simply, and with repetition that is unending. Today there are large waves coming towards us in all directions, the most serious (in my opinion said the Mayor) is the denigration of the natural family as the fundamental unit of society. It has been determined that the natural family results in healthier, happier, more productive, and more civically-engaged adults as well as healthier, happier, safer, and better educated children. We envision a local culture that upholds the marriage of a woman to a man, and a man to a woman, as ordained of God. This culture affirms marriage as the best path to health, security, fulfillment, and joy. It casts the home built on marriage as the source of true political sovereignty and ordered liberty. We envision parents as the first educators of their children.

The nonbinding resolution was formulated by the Sutherland Institute, a conservative advocacy group in Salt Lake City. The symbolic resolution created controversy within the city. Hundreds of tourists canceled trips to Kanab after learning about the resolution.

In Arthur Frommer's monthly travel column, Frommer called the city "homophobic" and urged readers to boycott the city.

A local civic group, the Kanab Boosters, published an open letter to ask Frommer to reconsider his boycott, making it clear that "only a small number of people agree with our city council regarding the Natural Family Proclamation." The Boosters also designed and provided stickers for citizens and resident business owners opposed to the resolution. The stickers featured a string of rainbow-colored human figures underneath the red rocks of Kanab and the words "Everyone welcome here".

In response to the criticism of the resolution, the Sutherland Institute clarified, saying that the resolution said that children are reared properly when a mother is home a significant amount of time and that a gay relationship is not a natural family.

=== Bikini ban ===
In June 2008, Kanab's city council voted to prohibit the wearing of bikinis and men's swim briefs at the city's new swimming pool. The ban was rescinded within a month.

== Kanab ambersnail ==
Three Lakes, a privately owned wet meadow near Kanab, is one of only two natural habitats for the Kanab ambersnail, a species listed as endangered in 1992 by the U.S. Fish and Wildlife Service and as a species of conservation priority for the Arizona Game and Fish Department.

== Notable people ==
- LaVoy Finicum – born here
- Jacob Hamblin
- William Thomas Stewart
- Kelly Sweet
- Mary Elizabeth Woolley

== Gallery ==
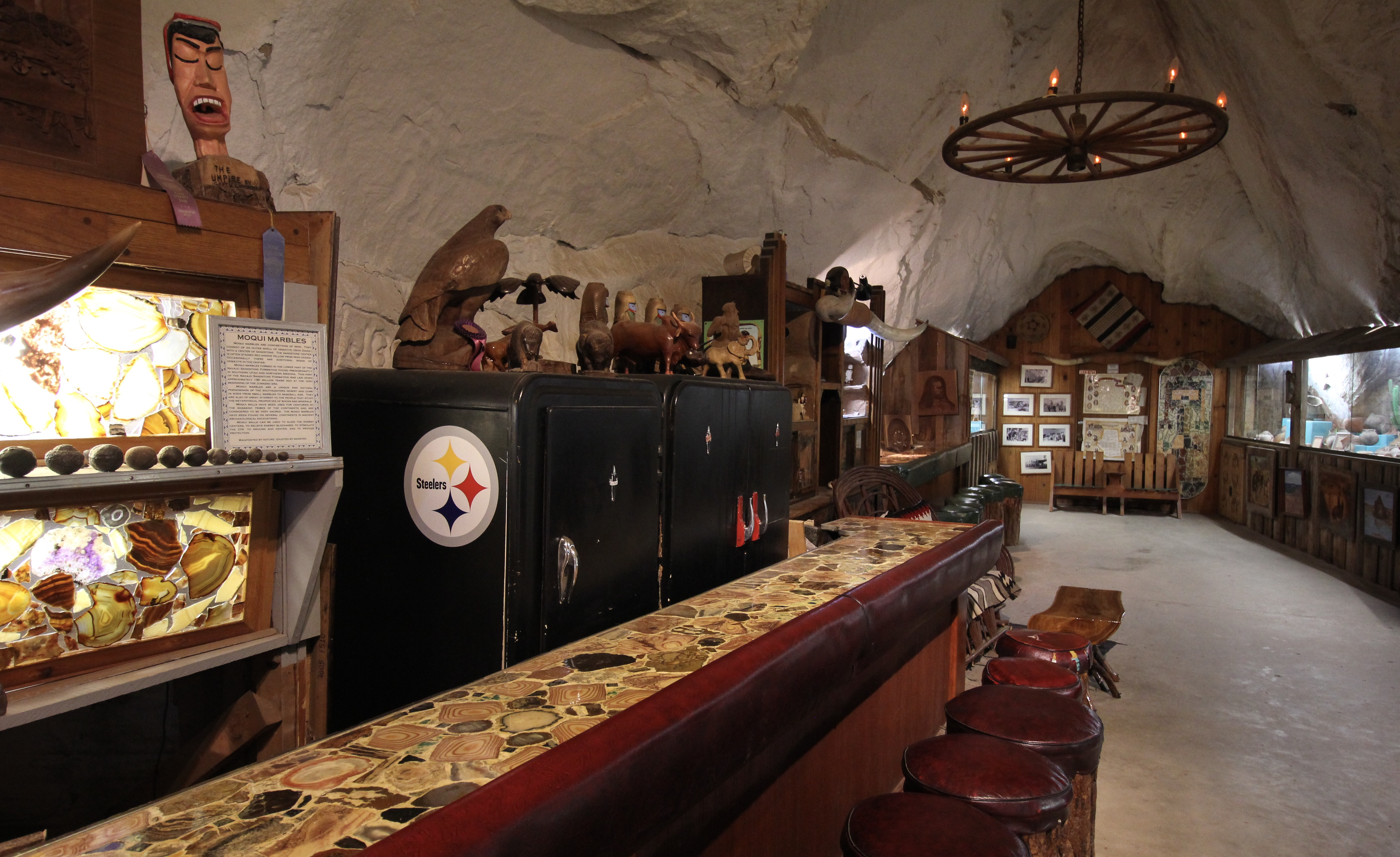
Moqui Cave

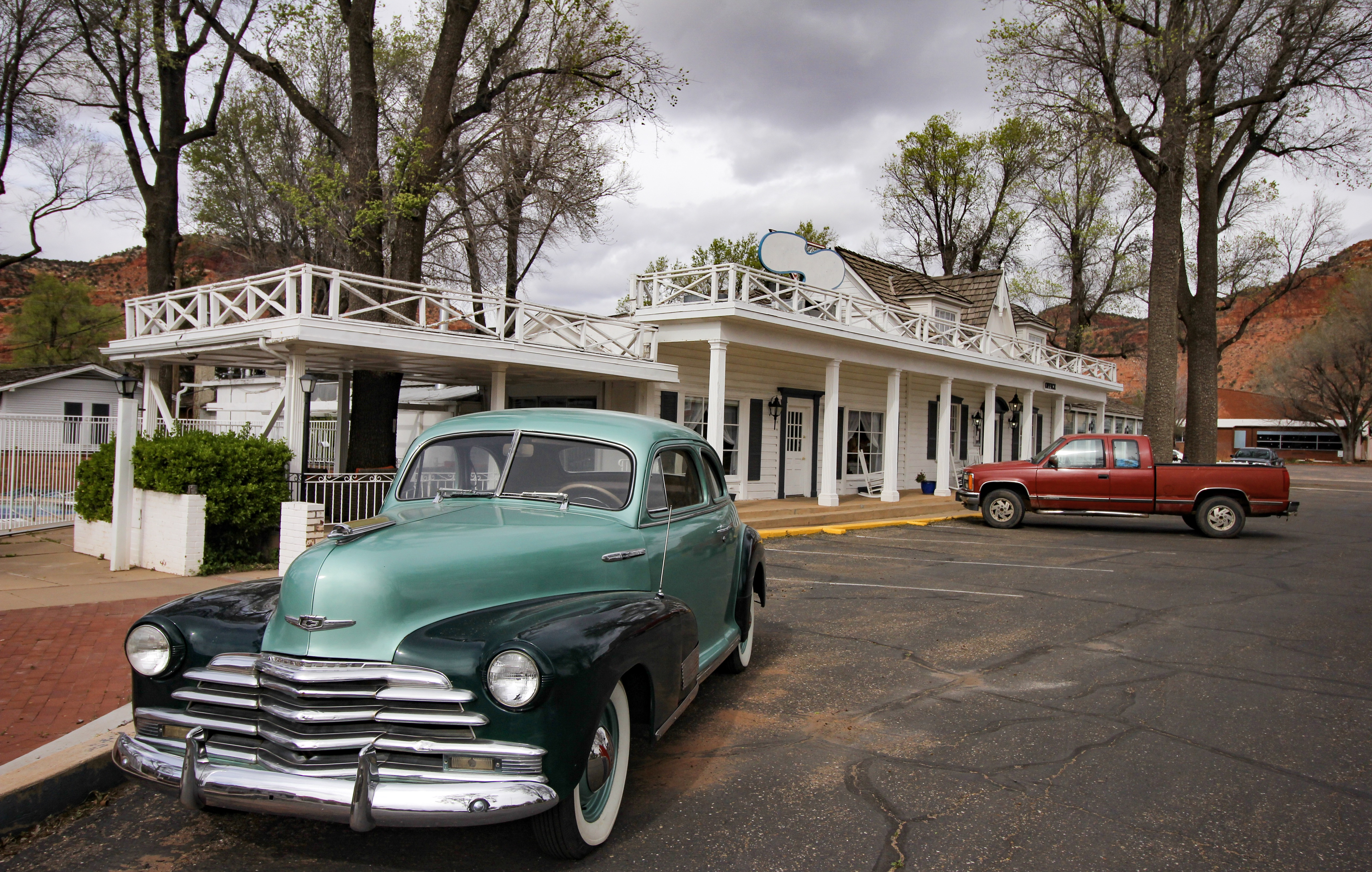
Parry Lodge, Historic Movie Motel

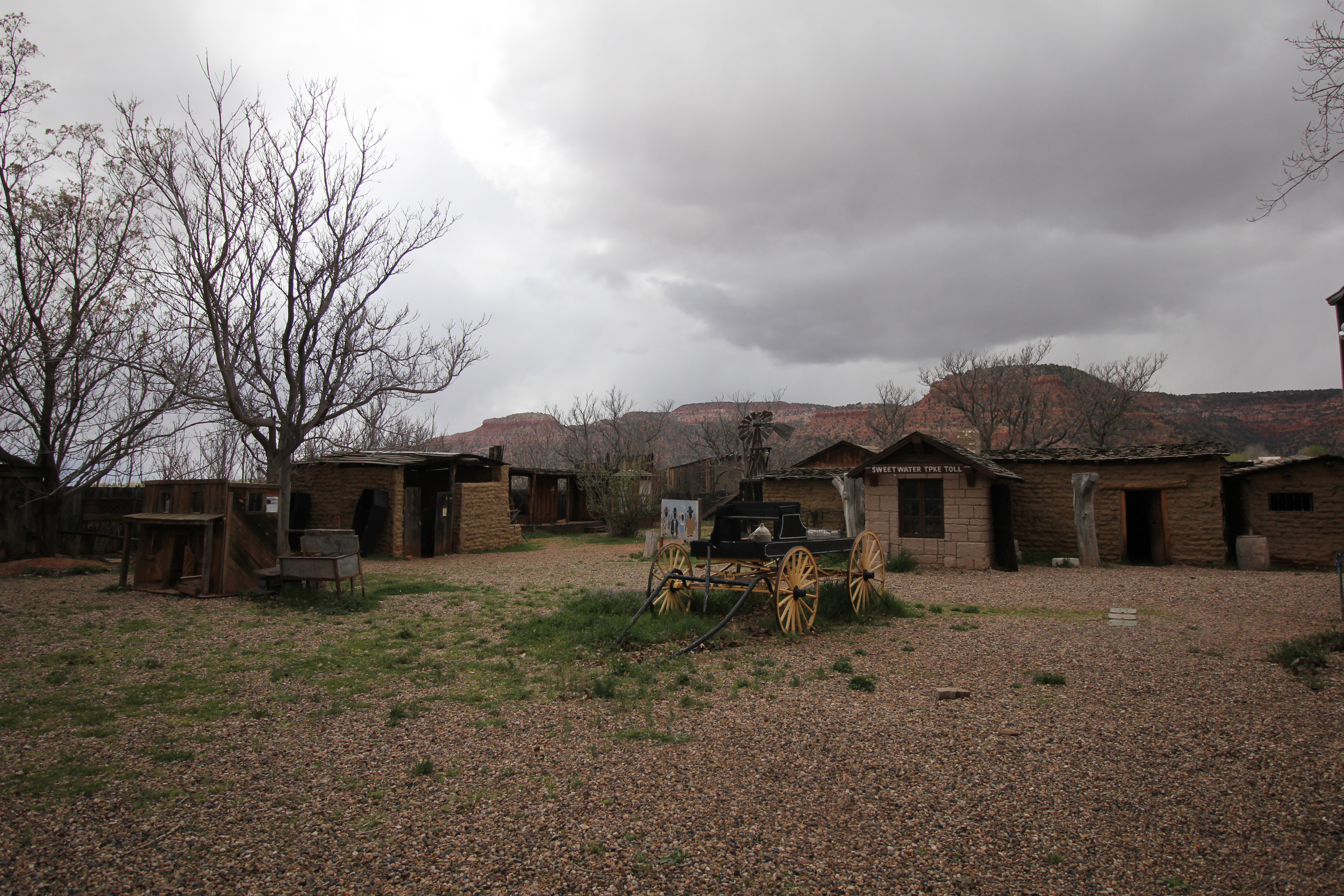
Little Hollywood Museum of Western Film

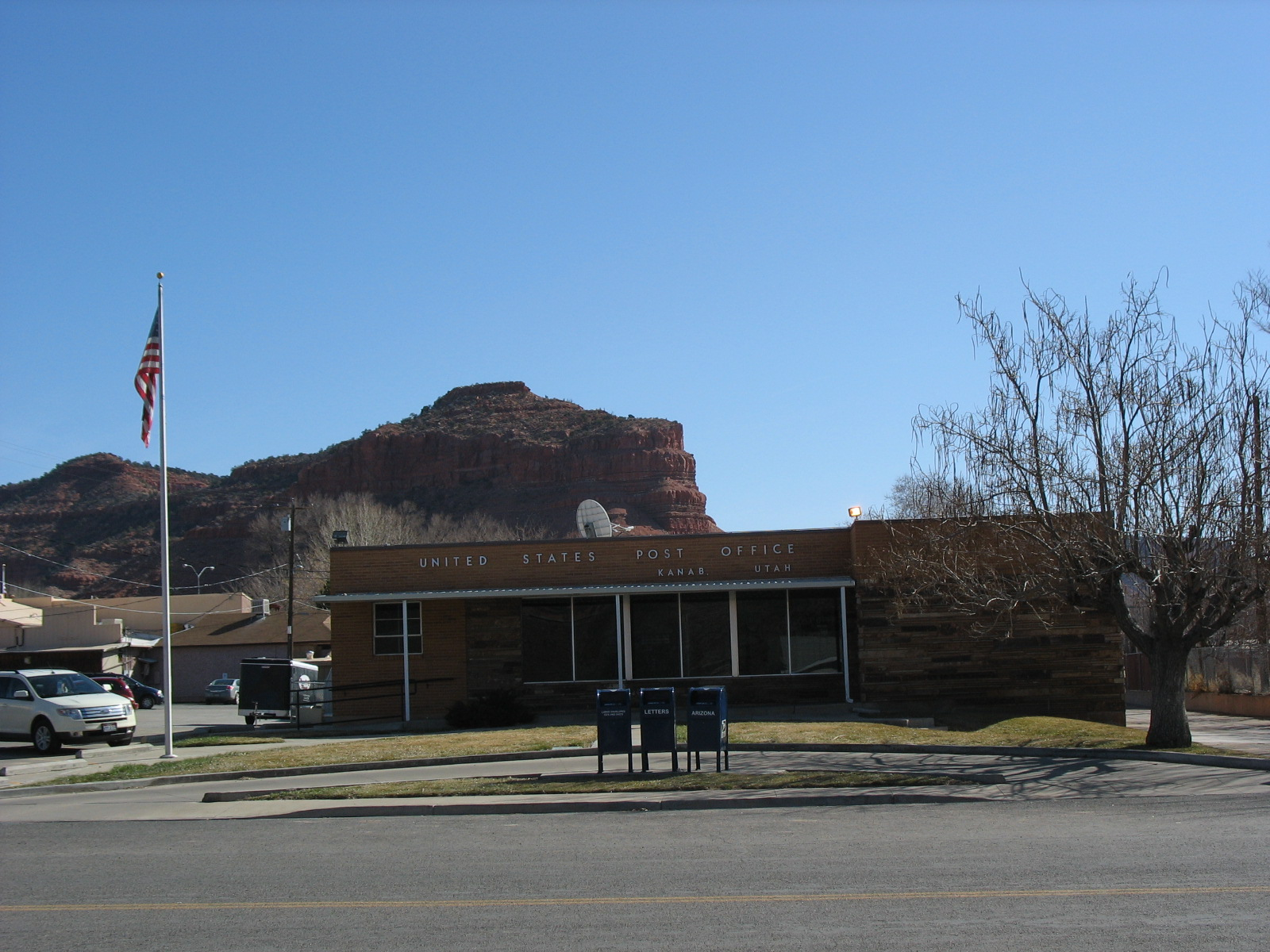
Kanab Post Office

== See also ==
- List of municipalities in Utah
- Buckskin Gulch
- Coyote Buttes
- Paria Canyon-Vermilion Cliffs Wilderness
- The Wave (Arizona)
- Wire Pass Trailhead
