= Moqui Cave =

Show cave in Kanab, Utah

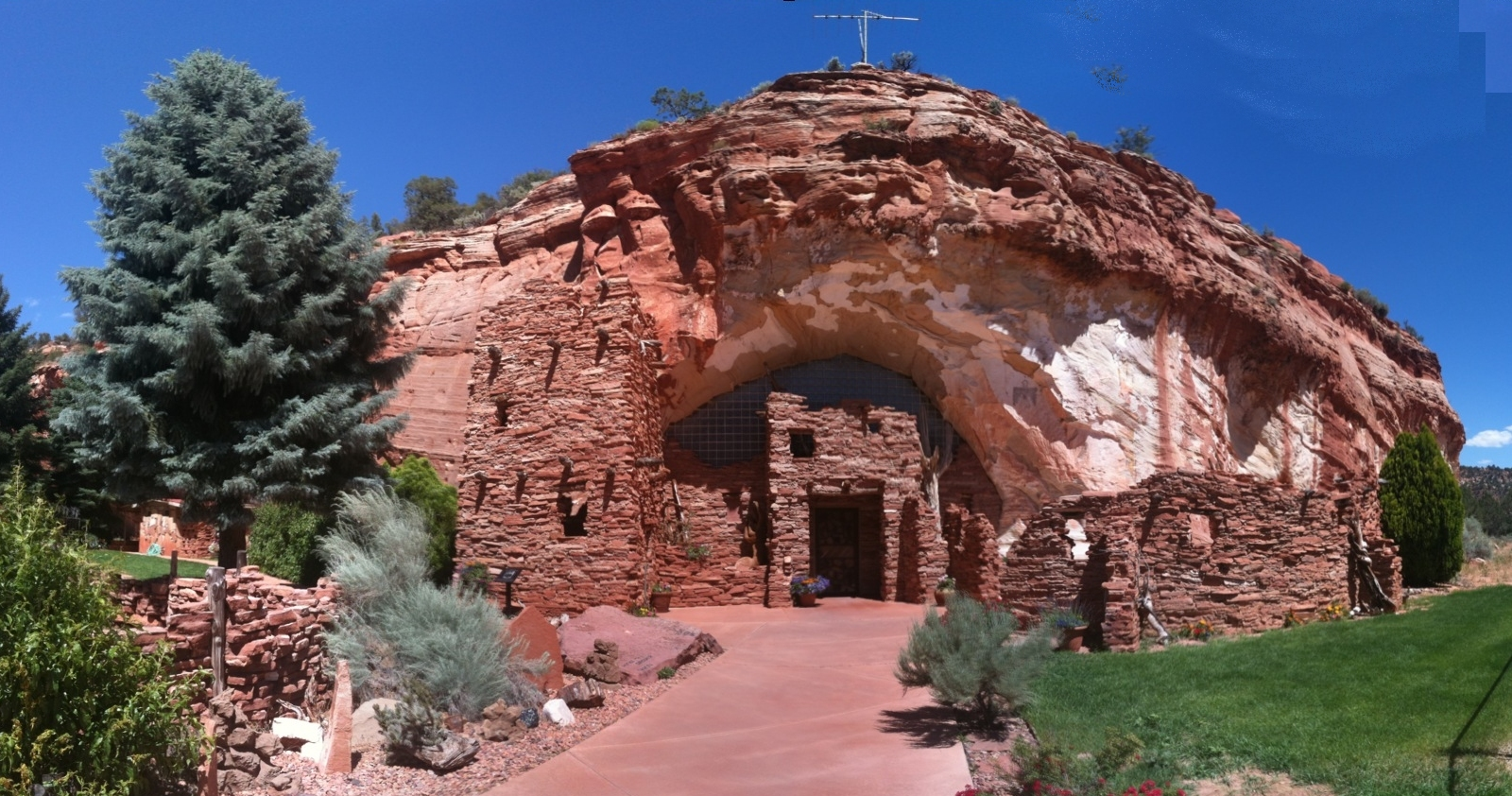
- Moqui Cave entrance
- Location: Kanab, Utah
- Coordinates: 37°07′15″N 112°33′50″W
- Type: museum
- Owner: Chamberlain family

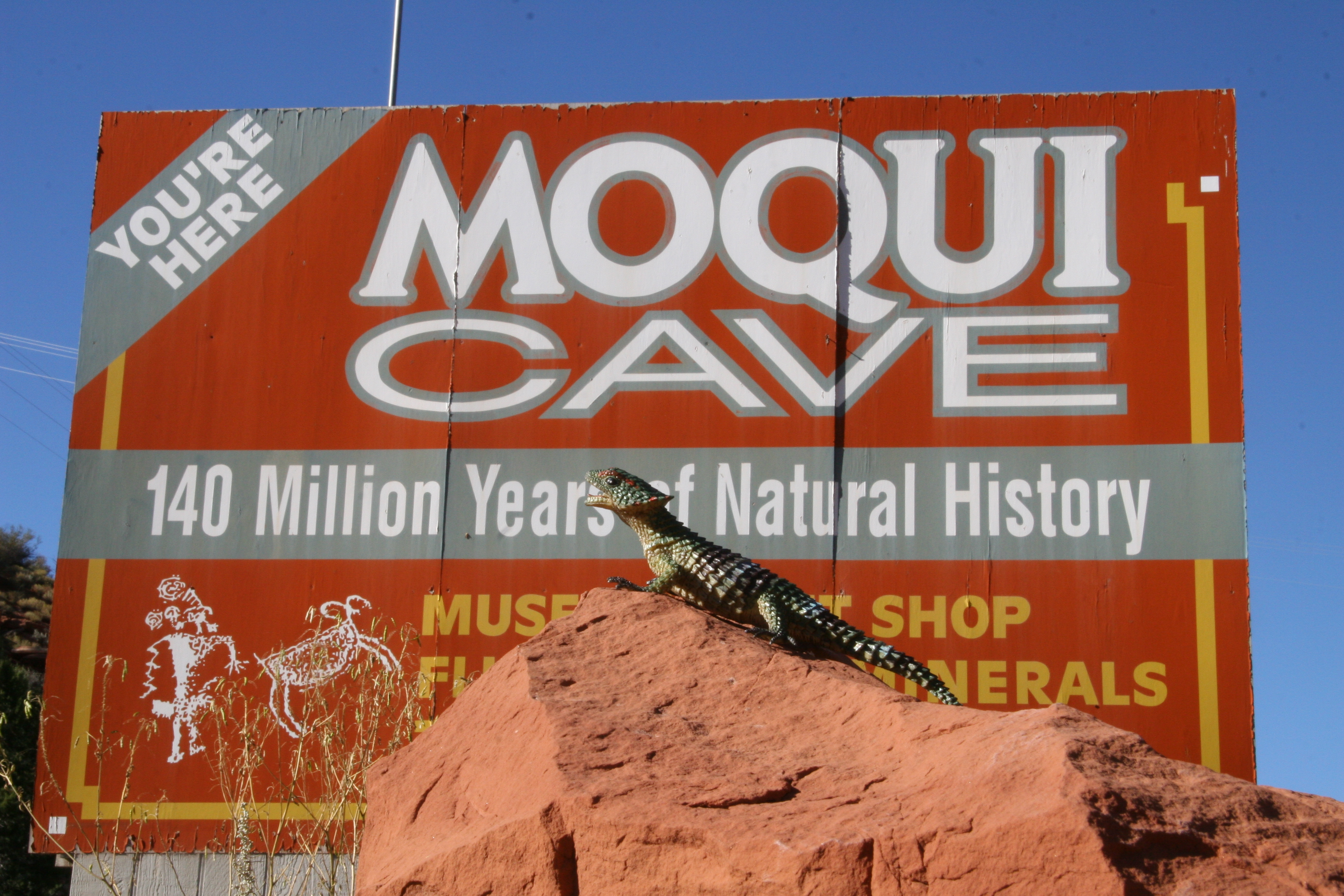
Moqui Cave signpost

Moqui Cave is a sandstone erosion cave in southern Utah, United States. It is located roughly 5 miles (8.0 km) north of Kanab, along U.S. Route 89.

== Etymology ==
The name comes from the Moqui (or Moki), which some archeologists believe to be an ancient tribe in the Anasazi-Hopi area at an unknown time period. They are not attested historically, and the name has been used to simply refer to ancient peoples of the area and by white people to refer to Indians in general. They originated as an explanation for moqui marbles, strange geologic concretions in the Navajo Sandstone Formation. More likely, the name comes from a Hopi language word meaning "[the] dead", moki, being related to religious beliefs. For the cave, the name is more related to the myths of the tribe than to the 'marbles', the Hopi, or the dead.

== History ==
Moqui Cave was once used by Anasazi people as a shelter or food store, according to archaeological digs in the area. It was rediscovered by white settlers in the 19th century, and served as a speakeasy in the 1920s during Prohibition.

In 1951, the cave was purchased by Laura and Garth Chamberlain, who opened a tavern and dance hall the following year, and it became a tourist attraction and museum.

== Collections ==
Its museum exhibits include a rock collection, including fluorescent minerals, fossils, pottery, spear points, American Indian artifacts and art, dinosaur tracks (estimated to be over 140 million years old).

It has displays about the Anasazi. There is also display about the Ancestral Puebloan.

In the saloon, the original mosaic bar-top and bar stools from the tavern days still exist. Behind the bar, there are moqui marbles in various sizes.

== Location ==
The cave lies along U.S. Route 89, about 5 miles (8.0 km) north of Kanab. It extends roughly 200 feet (61 m) into a Navajo Sandstone formation in the bottom of Three Lakes Canyon.

The cave referred to as the "Moqui Cave" is not a natural cave at all. It was a sand mine to obtain sand to make glass. The Indian lore and history may be authentic to the area, but the cave itself has nothing to do with the Moqui Indians or any other Indians. That component of the site is completely manufactured.
