= Mary E. Woolley Chamberlain =

American politician

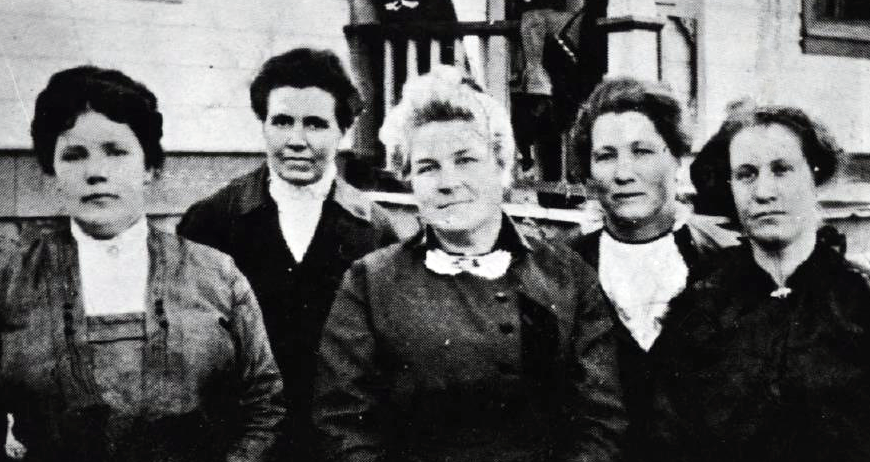
- Chamberlain (center) with Kanab's all-women town board she headed 1912–1914

Board President of Kanab, Utah
- In office 1912–1914

Personal details
- Born: January 31, 1870; St. George, Utah, U.S.
- Died: August 20, 1953 (aged 83); Pocatello, Idaho, U.S.

Mary Elizabeth Woolley Chamberlain (January 31, 1870 – August 20, 1953) was an American politician who served as the board president of Kanab, Utah, from 1912 to 1914. She presided over an all-women town board, and had earlier been elected as Utah's first female county clerk in 1896. She used the pseudonym Mary Howard during her time on the board.

== Early life ==
Mary Elizabeth Woolley was born on January 31, 1870, in St. George, Utah. She was the second child of Edwin Dilworth Woolley Jr. and Emma Geneva Bentley. She was named after both of her grandmothers. She grew up in Kane County, Utah in Kanab, just north of the Utah/Arizona border. Her father was stake president of the Kanab Stake of The Church of Jesus Christ of Latter-day Saints for more than 20 years.

== Career ==
Mary Chamberlain attended LDS College in Salt Lake City in fall of 1890. She gave the commencement address in June 1891 on "woman's mission". When she returned home, she worked at her father's mercantile store Bowman & Company. She was elected as the first woman county clerk in Utah in 1896. In 1911, she was elected to be president of an all-women board in Kanab; this position was equivalent to mayor. She was elected under the name Mary W. Howard, as she had married Thomas Chamberlain as his sixth wife when The Church of Jesus Christ of Latter-day Saints was ending the practice of plural marriage. Chamberlain wrote in 1936 that they were not actively seeking office and their candidacy was a practical joke as their ticket was formed on the day of the elections, as nobody in the town was concerned with who was elected in the positions. They were visited by Susa Young Gates who was excited about their work and wanted to learn more about what they were doing. Mary's letter to Gates, who called her "Mayor", was published in the July 1914 Improvement Era. When her husband Thomas Chamberlain died, she had to support herself and her children by selling homemade goods to travelers and offering up her home as a board house. She also carried a line of ladies' hats to make ends meet.

In 1923, she obtained a job as a traveling sales representative selling silk ladies clothes throughout Utah, Arizona, Idaho, and Wyoming; she maintained that job for 10 years. She remained active in church callings and in the Daughters of Utah Pioneers, moving frequently and living in Provo and Salt Lake City. She died on August 20, 1953, at the age of 84 from blood clot in Pocatello, Idaho, while visiting her granddaughter. She was buried in the Kanab cemetery.

== Town Board in Kanab ==
Mary Chamberlain was elected to be chairman of an all-women town board in 1911; the board served for two years. At the time they incorrectly supposed that this was the first all-woman town council in history. In reality, a newspaper cites Mary D. Lowman as a recently elected female mayor with an all-woman council in Oskaloosa, Kansas in 1888, 23 years before the election of Mary Chamberlain. She was, however, the first female board president of Kanab, Utah. The town board in Kanab consisted of five women: Vinnie Jepson, Tamar Hamblin, Blanche Hamblin, Luella McAllister, and Mary Chamberlain (then Howard) as president. Chamberlain and her town board took office on January 2, 1912, and reportedly had meetings in their own homes rather than at the courthouse. During a time when women were expected to stay at home and raise a family rather than work, all five newly elected politicians had families ranging from two to seven children, and were expected to simultaneously tend to their individual housework and church duties while in office.

In fact, because of the circumstances of the election, the women were actually taken more seriously than they would have been. Seeking election on a feminist platform would have likely created a more hostile attitude towards the board members, making it more difficult for them to have accomplished everything they were able to accomplish. They passed eight ordinances and initiated other measures focused on cleaning up the town of Kanab.

On February 23, they passed an act requiring traveling salesman to pay a tax per day to conduct business in order to protect local merchants. In May, they passed a law that regulated livestock and stray animals as well as a dog leash and registration law in July. They outlawed slingshots in town in order to protect wildlife. One of their large projects was related to alcohol and alcohol sales, at one point forbidding the mailing of alcohol to Kanab. On July 11, 1913, they passed an ordinance forbidding all sales and alcohol consumption without a medical prescription. They also passed ordinances forbidding disruptive and boisterous activities on the Sabbath and prohibiting gambling. They initiated projects to improve the town including cleaning up the local cemetery, building bridges over ditches, building a dike to protect the town from flooding, and finally appointing September 12, 1912 as "Stink Weed Day" offering monetary prizes for the individuals who best spruced up the town. They were encouraged to run for reelection, but they wanted to allow the honor to go to somebody else, hoping more women would be inclined to run for election. However, in 1914, an all-male board was elected, ending the short-lived era that the women conceived.

== Marriage ==
Mary Woolley married Thomas Chamberlain in Mexico (his sixth and last wife) on August 6, 1900. She was 30; he was 46. It was 10 years after Wilford Woodruff declared the Manifesto to end plural marriage in The Church of Jesus Christ of Latter-day Saints. The law forced them to marry in Mexico, where it was still legal. They lived apart for much of their marriage. In 1901, she used the name "Mrs. Thomas" as opposed to her legal surname "Chamberlain" to avoid persecution as her husband had spent 1888–1889 in the state penitentiary for unlawful cohabitation. She changed her name to "Howard" in 1904. They met because she worked in the store that he partly owned and managed. He was also county treasurer while she was county clerk and he was a counselor in her father's presidency. He proposed marriage and they decided they should marry three years later.

In July 1900, Thomas traveled to Mexico to determine if marriage would be possible, there he met President George Q. Cannon, who advised him on how to proceed with the marriage. Mary joined Thomas in Mexico to be married. They went home separately and she continued to work at the store for another year. She quit her job to go into hiding in Salt Lake City due to being pregnant with her first son as a result of a plural marriage. She began using the pseudonym "Thomas" as a surname to avoid detection, this way of living lasted six years.

Her first son, Royal Reward "Thomas" (Thomas Chamberlain's 50th child) was born in 1903. She was forced to move several times to avoid being caught. In June 1904, she headed to Mexico for a short period of time, changing her name again to "Howard". Her last child and Thomas Chamberlain's 53rd child, Edwin Dilworth "Howard" was born in 1905. Mary moved back to Kanab to live with her parents in October 1907, believing she would be safer there. At this time, she went back to work and became active in church callings. In fall 1911, she moved across the street from her parents. Mary did not publicly use her legal last name until 1916. Thomas Chamberlain died on March 17, 1918, of complications from diabetes, during a time when Mary Chamberlain was suffering from debilitating rheumatism.

== Children ==
Mary and Thomas Chamberlain had two sons. Royal Reward Chamberlain was born on February 3, 1902, and Edwin "Dee" Dilworth Chamberlain was born on August 19, 1905. Royal Chamberlain died in 1951 at the age of 49 due to complications from a brain tumor, two years before his mother Mary Chamberlain.

== Autobiography ==
Mary E. Woolley Chamberlain's autobiography resides in L. Tom Perry Special Collections at the Harold B. Lee Library at Brigham Young University.
