= Wire Pass Trailhead =

Trailhead in Kane County, Utah, United States

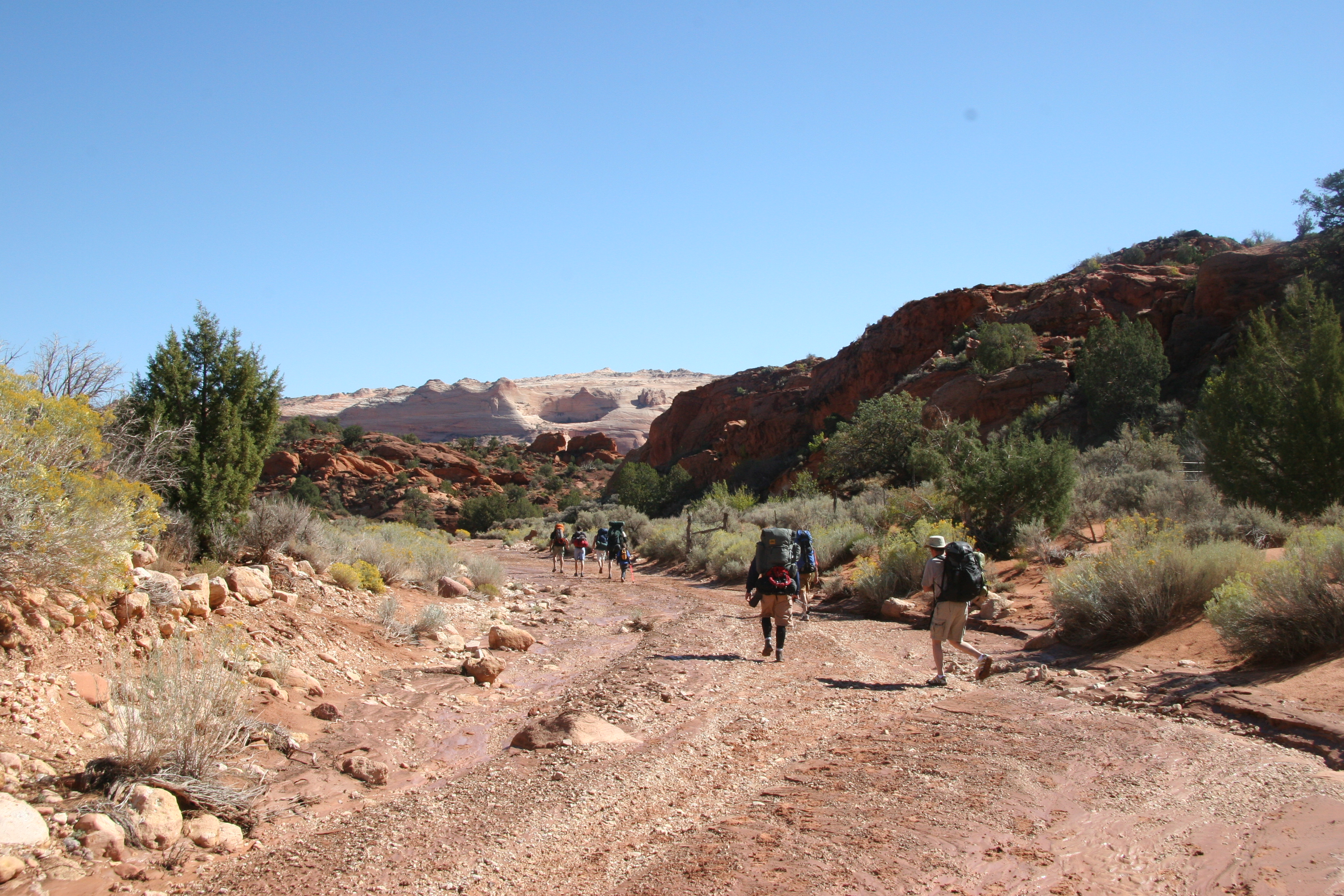
Wire Pass Trailhead
Elevation	4870 ft (1484 m)
Latitude	37° 1′ 8.76″ N
Longitude	112° 1′ 29.52″ W
Location	Kane County, Utah, US
USGS Topo Map	Pine Hollow Canyon
Facilities:	Parking and Restrooms – No water

Wire Pass Trailhead is a recreation access point in Kane County, Utah that features several trails leading to natural points of interest.

== Description ==
The trailhead is located in Paria Canyon–Vermilion Cliffs Wilderness Area of southern Utah and northern Arizona, about halfway between Kanab, Utah and Page, Arizona. Located about 8.3 miles (13.4 km) south of US 89 along House Rock Valley Road on the Utah side of the Utah–Arizona border in Utah, the road is normally accessible in a passenger vehicle, though the dirt road turns slick and muddy with rain.

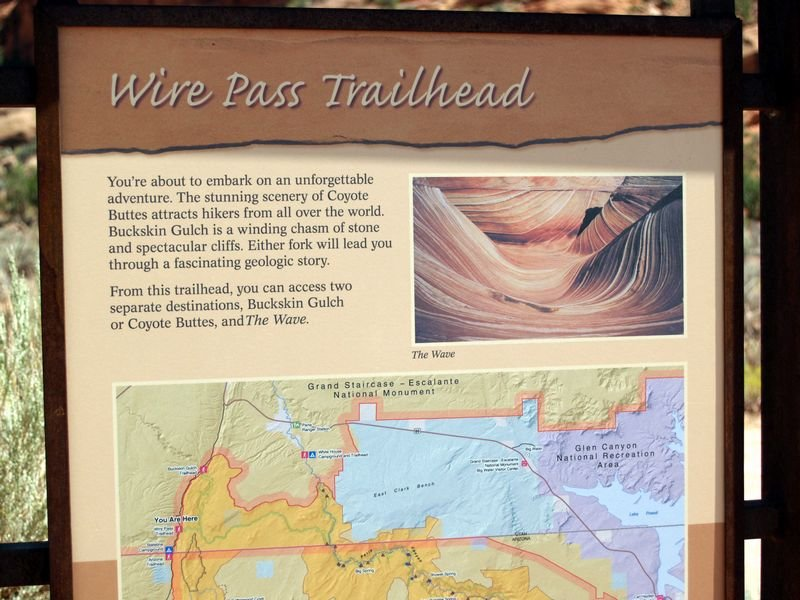
Sign at the Wire Pass Trailhead

From this trailhead, some of the hike options are the North Coyote Buttes to the Wave, to Wire Pass Narrows and onward to Buckskin Gulch.

The Bureau of Land Management (BLM) limits access to the North and South Coyote Buttes Wilderness Areas.

The day hike to Wire Pass Narrows begins opposite the trailhead in the wash. Following the wash northward takes you to the Wire pass narrows and subsequently to Buckskin Gulch.

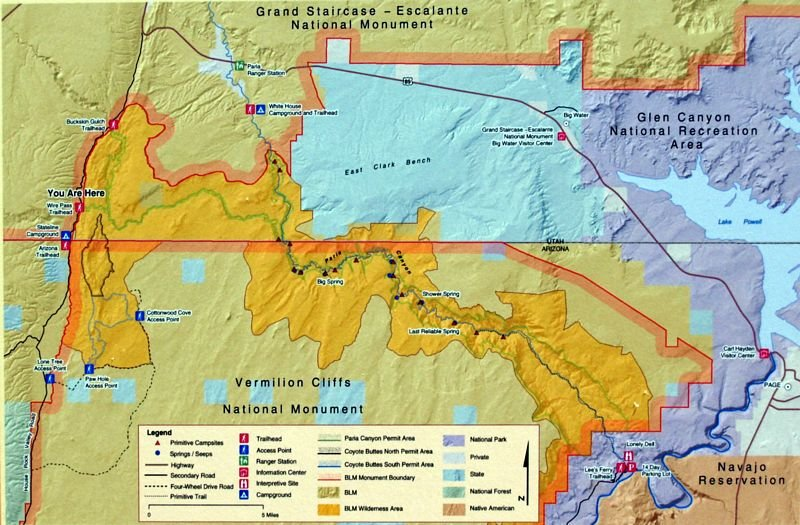
Map at the Wire Pass Trailhead

There is a pit toilet at the parking lot but no campsites. There is a campsite with pit toilet 2 miles (3.2 km) further south down House Rock Valley Road.
