= Coyote Buttes =

Rock formation in Coconino County, Arizona, US

Coordinates: 36°58′04″N 112°00′41″W

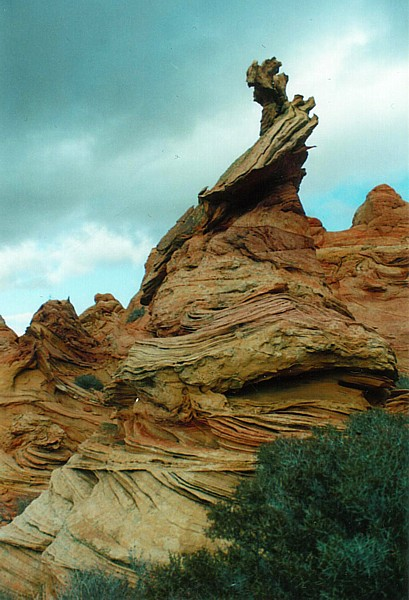
The Magic Crest of South Coyote Buttes.

Coyote Buttes is a section of the Paria Canyon-Vermilion Cliffs Wilderness managed by the Bureau of Land Management (BLM). It spans extreme south-central Utah and north-central Arizona, south of US 89 halfway between Kanab, Utah and Page, Arizona. It is divided into two areas: Coyote Buttes North and Coyote Buttes South. A hiking permit is required to visit either of the Coyote Buttes areas.

The Coyote Buttes area is an exposure of cross-bedded aeolian Jurassic Navajo Sandstone. The variable coloration of the sandstones is a result of various iron oxide pigments within the layers. A dinosaur trackway or trample surface is found in the area and provides evidence of a variety of dinosaurs. The area includes dramatic swirling erosional rock formations such as The Wave.

The Wave and Buckskin Gulch share the Wire Pass Trailhead on House Rock Valley Road.

== Dinosaur trackway ==
The dinosaur trackway within the area is a site of 0.75 acres (3,000 m^{2}) that has densely packed dinosaur footprints within the area. The trackway contains more than 1,000 footprints which were made approximately 190 million years ago. Tracks of three genera of Eubrontes, Anchisauripus and Grallator are present along with a Sauropodomorph that has not been identified.

== Gallery ==
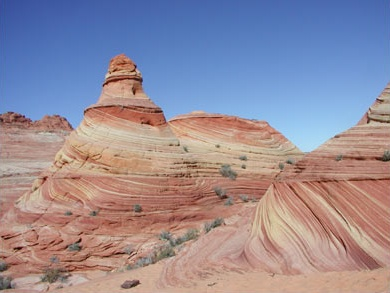
Coyote Buttes

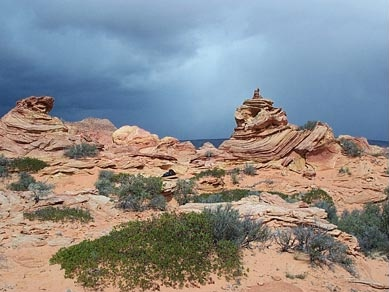
Coyote Buttes

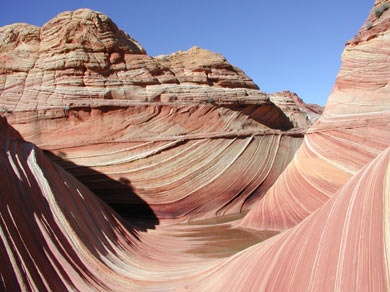
The Wave

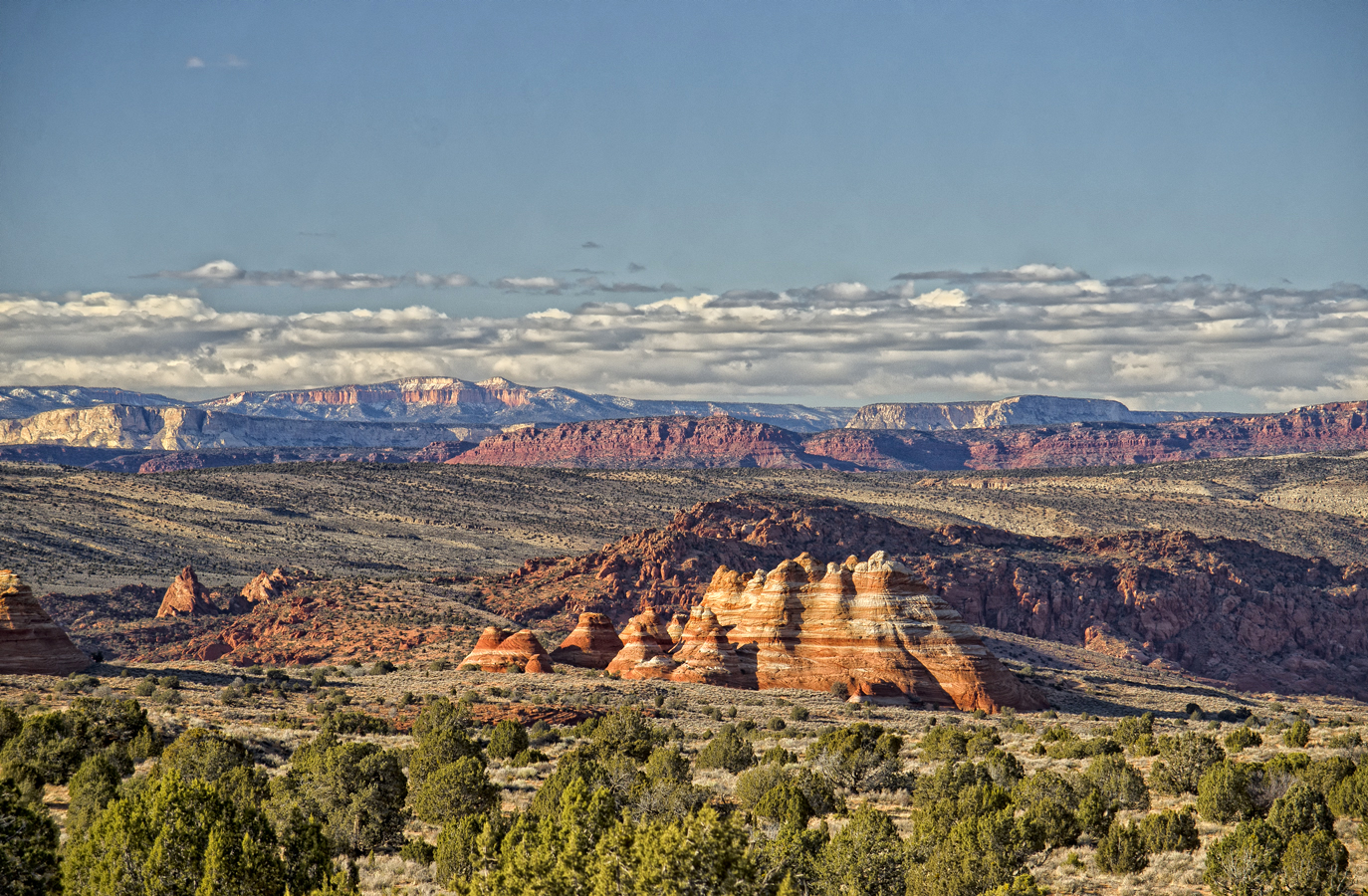
Looking north past the teepees, in Coyote Buttes South
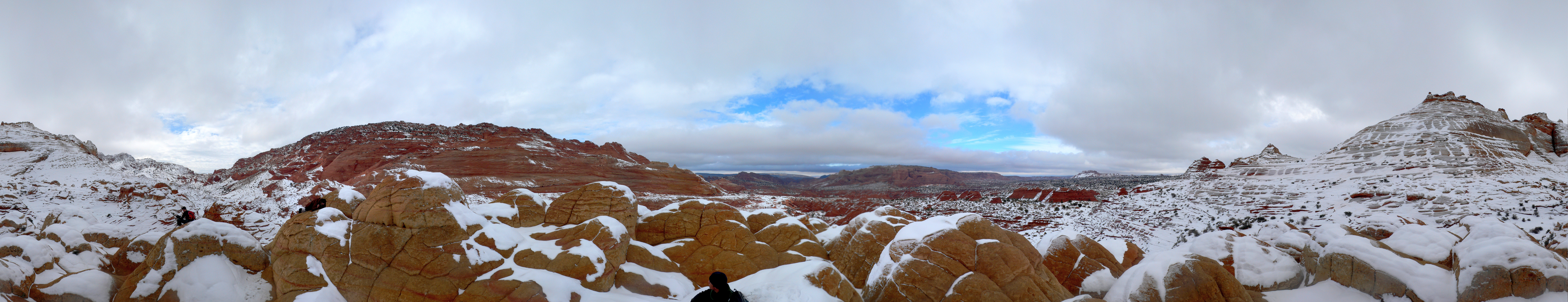
Panorama, Brain Rock Garden, Coyote Buttes
