= Paria Canyon-Vermilion Cliffs Wilderness =

Wilderness area in Arizona and Utah, U.S.

- IUCN category Ib (wilderness area)
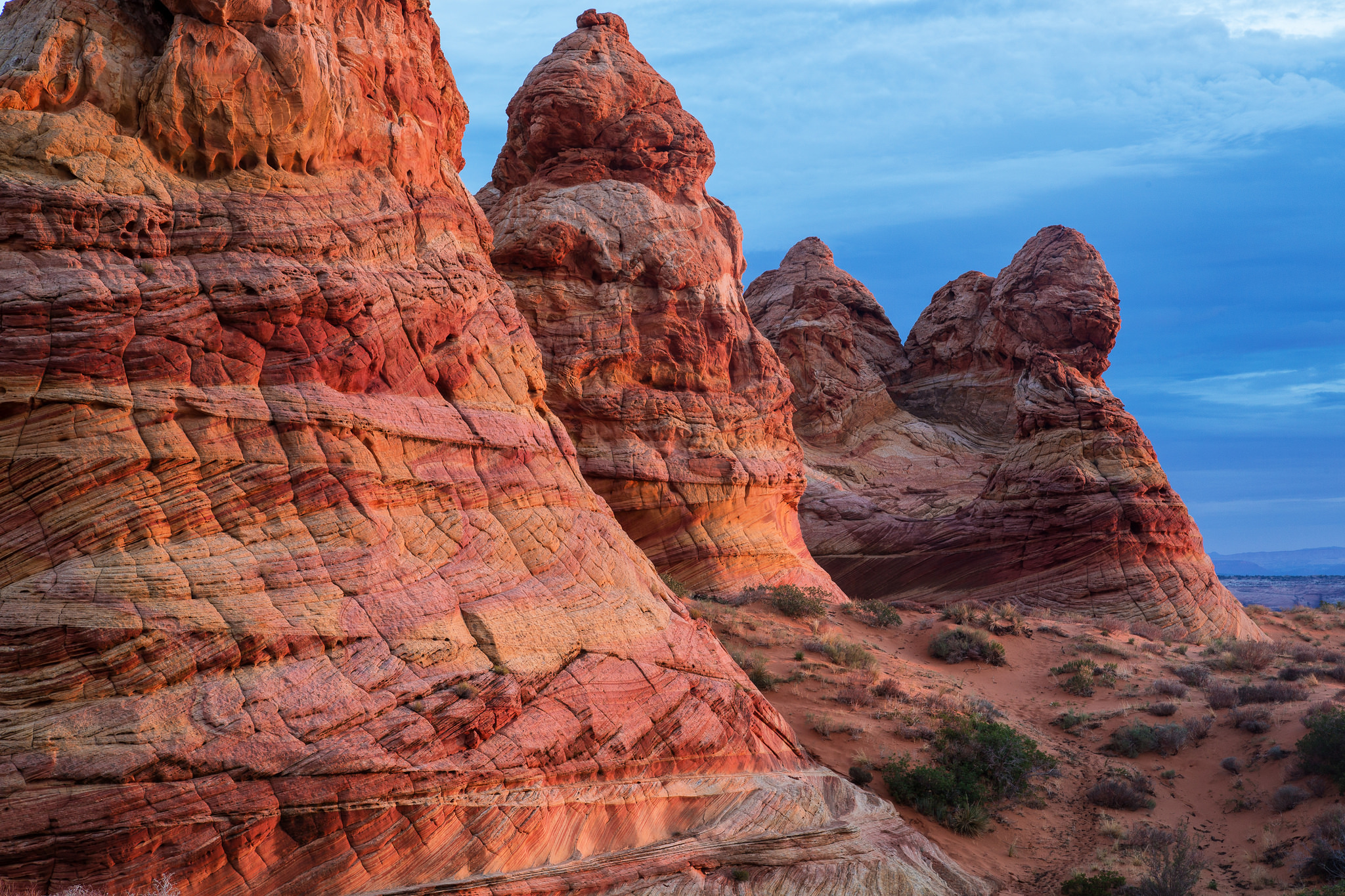
- Location: Coconino County, Arizona / Kane County, Utah, United States
- Nearest city: Page, Arizona
- Coordinates: 36°53′46″N 111°49′37″W
- Area: 112,500 acres (455 km^{2})
- Established: August 28, 1984
- Governing body: U.S. Bureau of Land Management

The Paria Canyon-Vermilion Cliffs Wilderness is a 112,500 acres (455 km^{2}) wilderness area located in northern Arizona and southern Utah, United States, within the arid Colorado Plateau region. The wilderness is composed of broad plateaus, tall escarpments, and deep canyons.

The Paria River flows through the wilderness before joining the Colorado River at Lee's Ferry, Arizona.

The U.S. Congress designated the wilderness area in 1984 and it was largely incorporated into the new Vermilion Cliffs National Monument proclaimed in 2000 by executive order of President Bill Clinton.

Both the wilderness area and the National Monument are administered by the federal Bureau of Land Management.

The Colorado Plateau and its river basins are of immense value in the Earth sciences, specifically chronostratigraphy, as the region contains multiple terrain features exposing miles-thick contiguous rock columns that geologists and paleobiologists use as reference strata of the geologic record.

== Human history ==
Ancient petroglyphs, granaries, and campsites indicate that ancestral Puebloan people utilized the Wilderness between AD 200 and AD 1200. They hunted mule deer and bighorn sheep and grew corn, beans, and squash in the lower end of the canyon. Paiute people later occupied and traveled much of the area before Europeans arrived. Because no habitations or large villages have been found in the canyon, researchers believe the canyon was primarily used as a travel route.

The first documented Europeans in the area were Fathers Francisco Atanasio Domínguez and Silvestre Vélez de Escalante of the Domínguez–Escalante expedition. The expedition stopped at the mouth of the Paria River in 1776 after they unsuccessfully attempted to establish a route from Santa Fe, New Mexico, to Monterey, California. The 19th century drew outlaws who hid out in the Wilderness and prospectors who mined gold, uranium, and other minerals.

== Wildlife ==
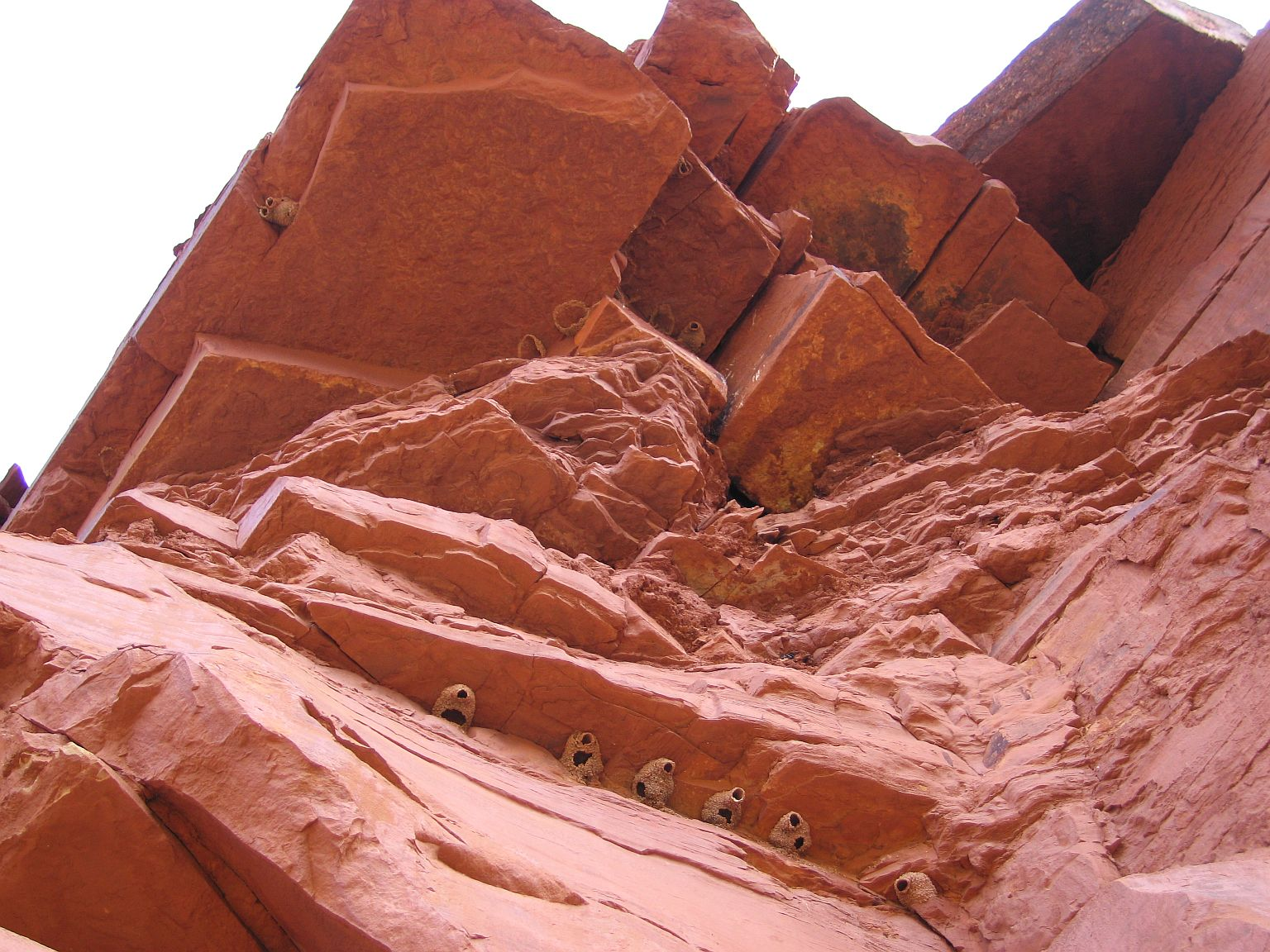
Cliff swallow nests

A variety of wildlife makes its home in the Paria Canyon-Vermilion Cliffs Wilderness.

=== Birds ===
Many bird species are found in the Wilderness, including bald eagle, golden eagle, peregrine falcon, red-tailed hawk, great horned owl, and Cooper's hawk. Other birds seen in the Wilderness include white-throated swift, violet-green swallow, rock wren, canyon wren, killdeer, cliff swallow, black-throated sparrow, ruby-crowned kinglet, blue-gray gnatcatcher, black-chinned hummingbird, great blue heron, flycatchers and various species of duck. The Wilderness was the location of a 1996 release of captively-bred endangered California condors in an attempt to re-introduce them to the wild.

=== Mammals ===
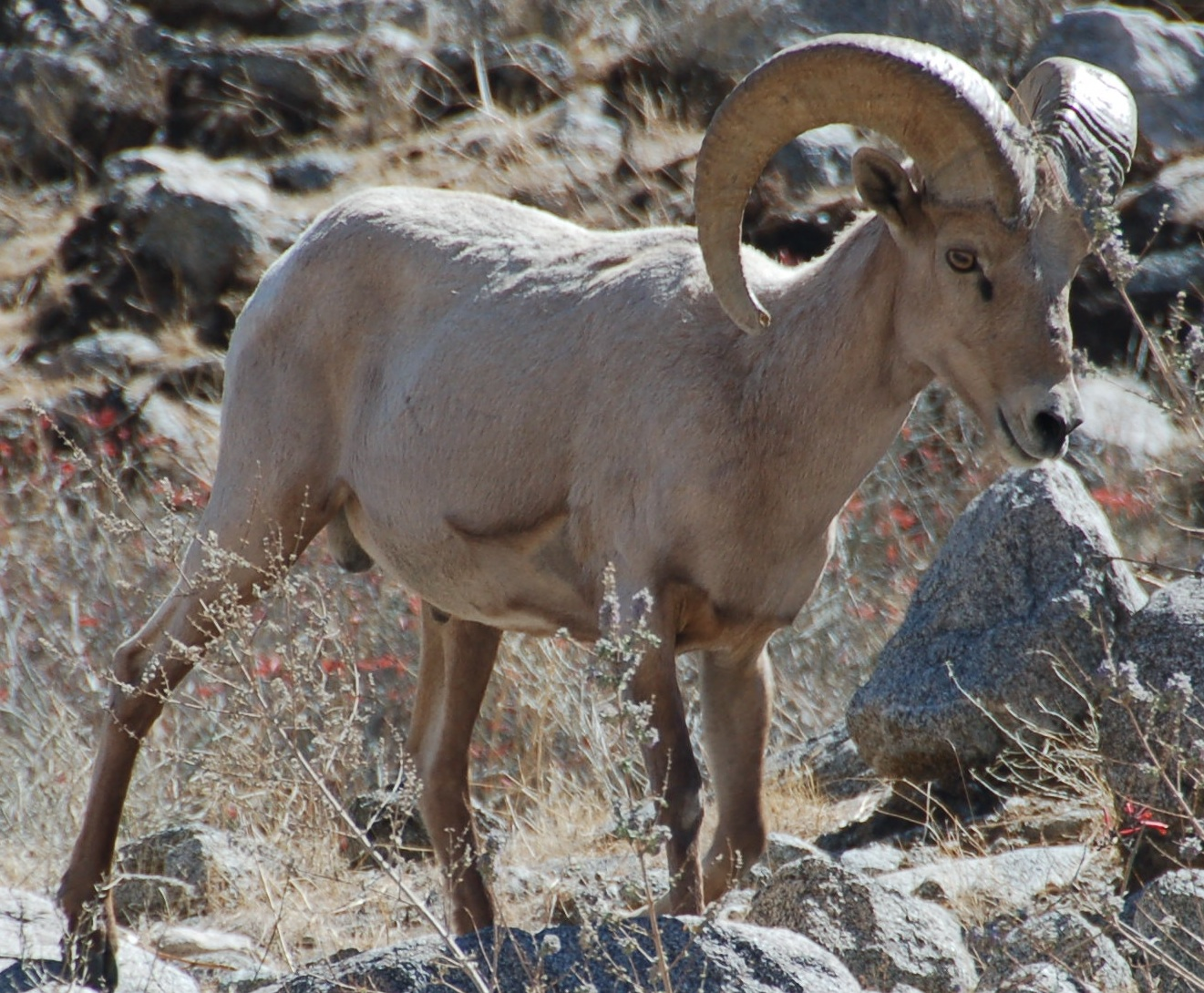
Desert bighorn sheep

Mammals found in the Wilderness include mule deer, bobcat, fox, mountain lion, porcupine, beaver, coyote, jack rabbit, cottontail rabbit, ground squirrels, kangaroo rat, and various other rodent species. Desert bighorn sheep were successfully reintroduced to Paria Canyon in the 1980s and are usually found in the cliffs and crags of the lower canyon.

=== Reptiles and amphibians ===
A variety of reptiles live in the Wilderness, including rattlesnake, chuckwalla, side-blotched lizard, leopard lizard, desert spiny lizard, and collared lizard. The red-spotted toad can be spotted in the canyon and four species of fish are occasionally found in the Paria River - the flannel mouth sucker, bluehead sucker, razorback sucker, and speckled dace.

== Vegetation ==
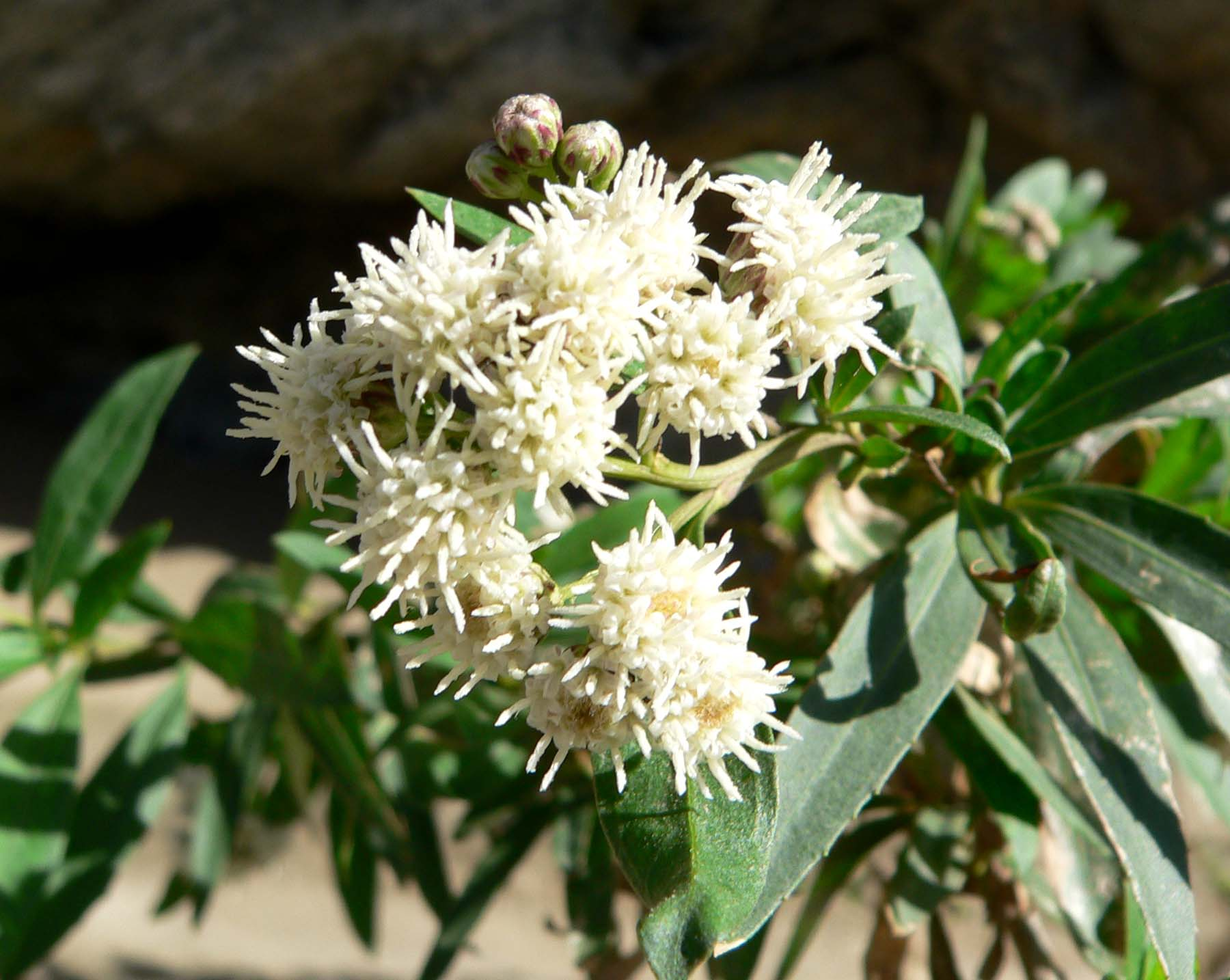
Seep willow (Baccharis salicifolia)

Vegetation in the Paria Canyon-Vermilion Cliffs Wilderness can be divided into three different zones of riparian vegetation communities, which run parallel to each side of the river. Plants found closest to the water include cattails, common reeds, sedges, rushes, and horsetails.

Drier soil farther from the water makes a good environment for woody vegetation which has survived the repeated flooding, such as coyote willow, cottonwood, ash, tamarisk, and seep-willow. This zone is referred to as the "regeneration site" because some of the trees that grow here survive to produce the next generation of mature canopy.

Beyond the regeneration site trees grow strong and tall. Dominant vegetation includes cottonwood, willow, ash, and tamarisk. This zone is the fringe between riparian and desert uplands, often sharing vegetation like rabbitbrush, Indian ricegrass, arrowweed, and sand dropseed.

Other vegetation found in the Wilderness include pinyon pine, juniper, boxelder, various species of cactus, and other desert flora.

== Recreation ==
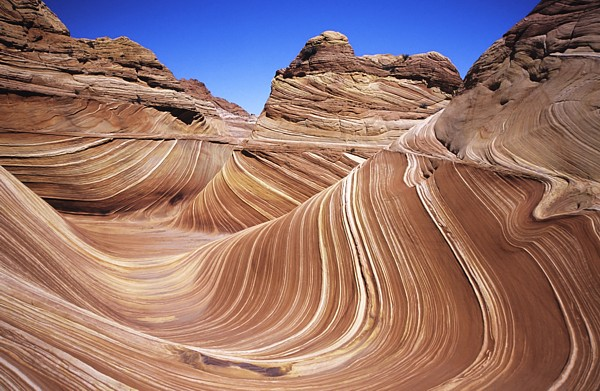
The Wave formation in Coyote Buttes

Hiking is the most common recreational activity in the Paria Canyon-Vermilion Cliffs Wilderness, followed by camping, photography, and canyoneering. Hikes through Paria Canyon are popular. The White House Trailhead is the main entrance and, therefore, more popular than the other trailheads in the Wilderness. Wire Pass Trailhead is the starting point for hiking into the canyon via Buckskin Gulch, as well as to spectacular sandstone formations such as The Wave on the slopes of the Coyote Buttes.

The BLM has placed a limit on overnight camping in the Paria Canyon portion of the Wilderness in order to protect it from overuse. It is also necessary to obtain a permit for the popular hike to the Wave formation in Coyote Buttes.

== See also ==
- Wilderness Act
- List of U.S. Wilderness Areas
- List of Arizona Wilderness Areas
