= Buckskin Gulch =

Canyon in Utah, United States

Coordinates: 37°00′06″N 111°51′58″W

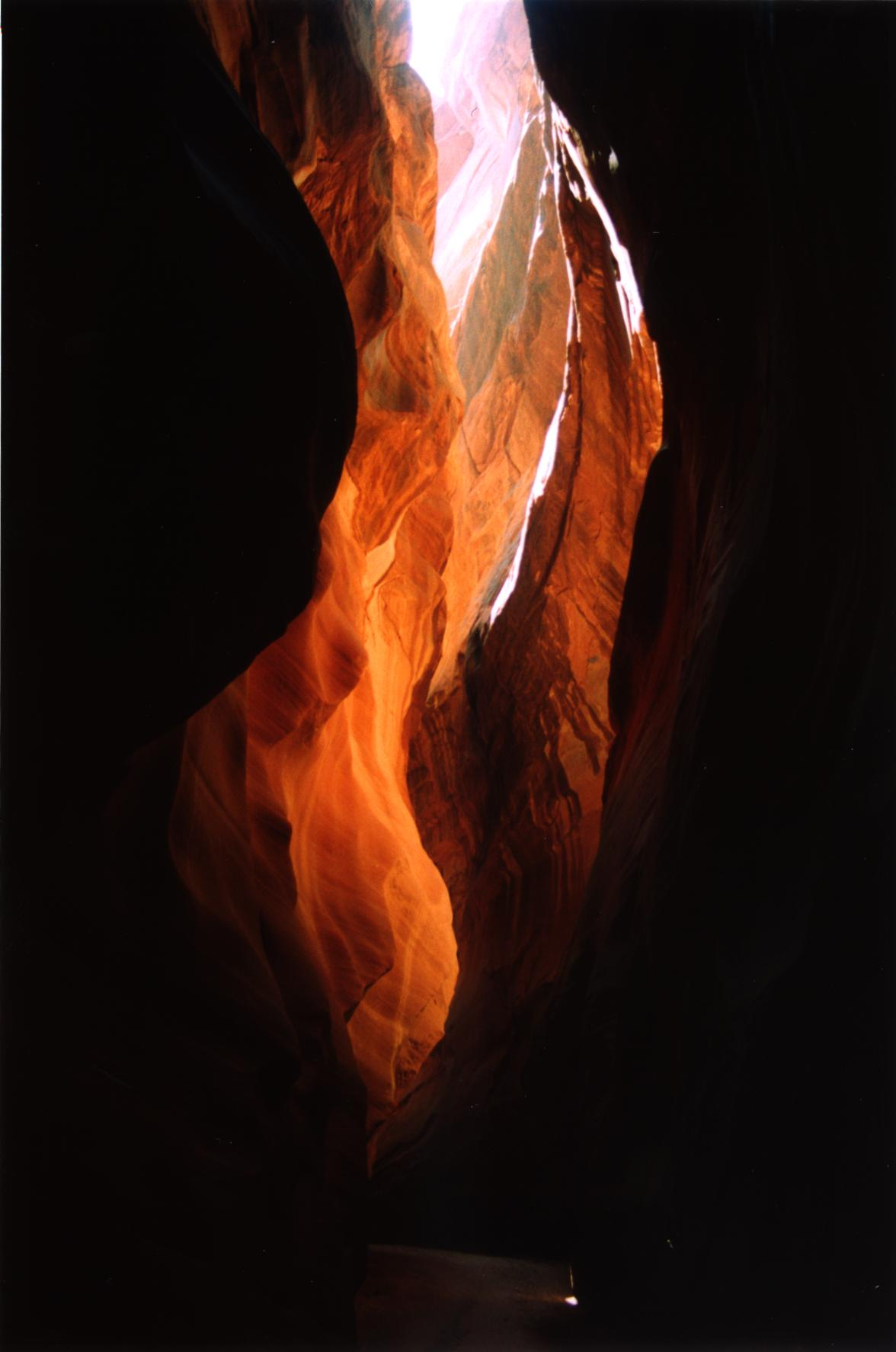
Inside Buckskin Gulch

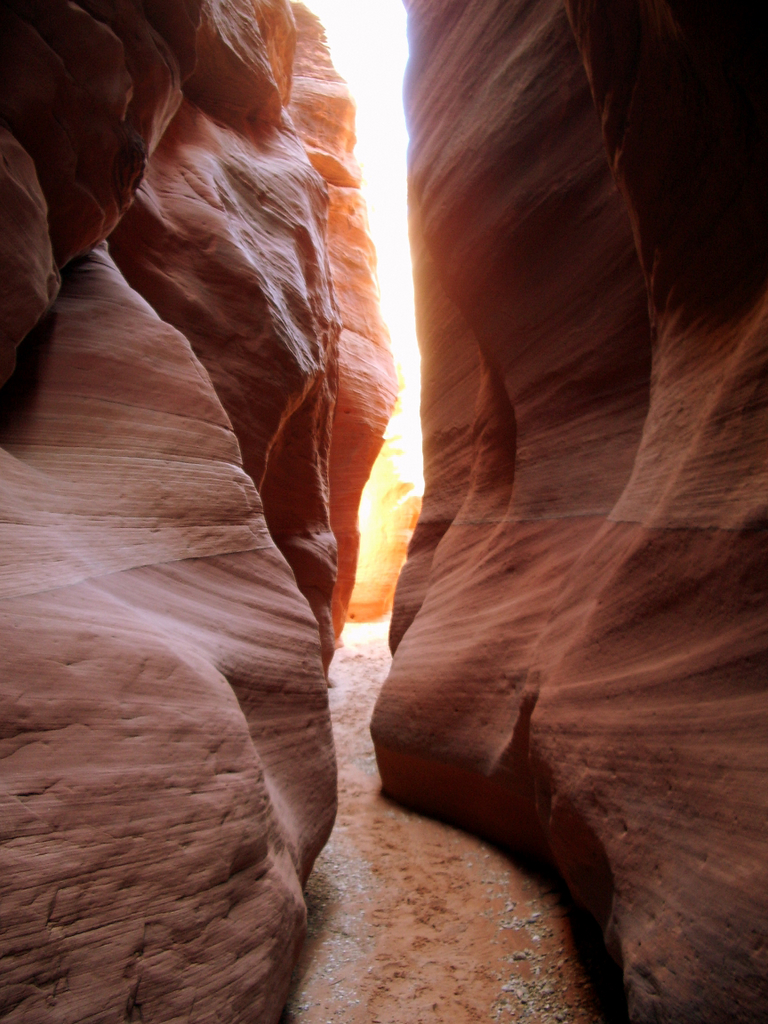
Inside Wire Pass slot canyon, the primary entrance into Buckskin Gulch

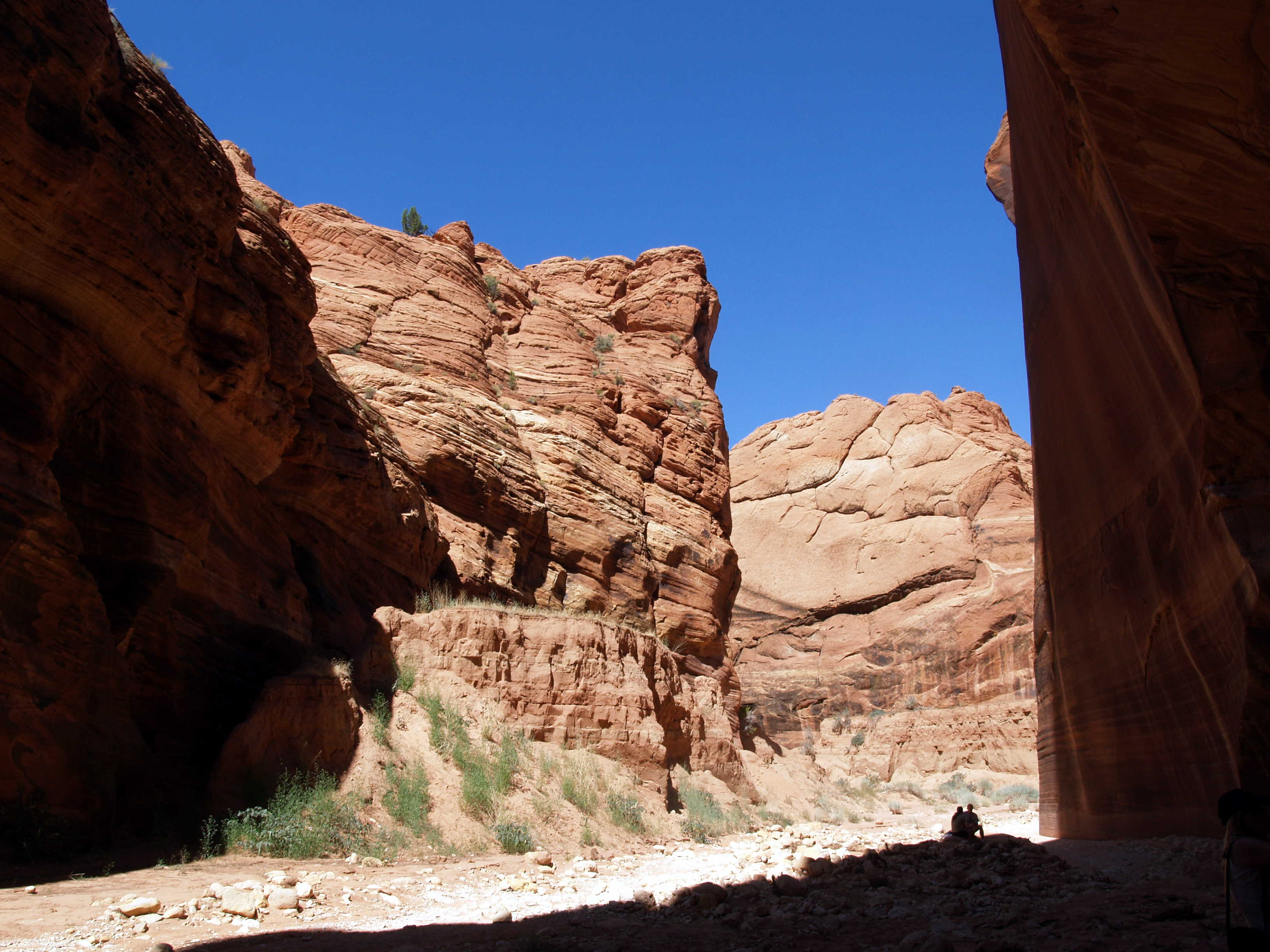
Confluence of Wire Pass canyon and Buckskin Gulch.

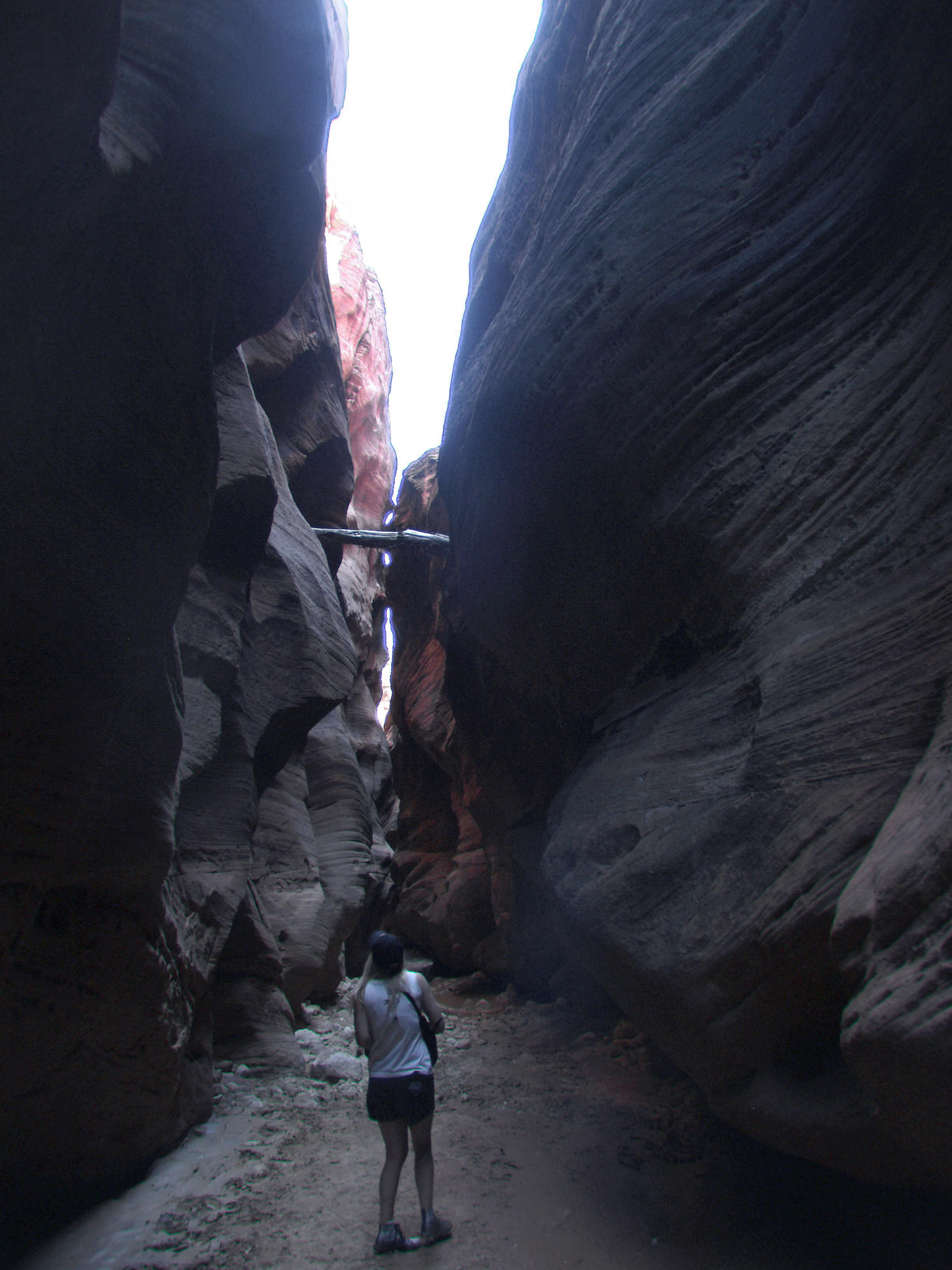
A log stuck in the narrow walls of Buckskin Gulch, about 40 feet (12 m) above ground level

Buckskin Gulch (also known as Buckskin Creek, Buckskin Wash, and Kaibab Gulch) is a gulch and canyon located in southern Kane County, Utah, near the Arizona border in the Paria Canyon-Vermilion Cliffs Wilderness. With a length of over 16 miles (26 km), it is one of the main tributaries of the Paria River, a tributary of the Colorado River.

Buckskin Gulch is one of the longest and deepest slot canyons in the Southwestern United States.

Wire Pass, a short tributary to Buckskin (and the most common means by which Buckskin Gulch is accessed), have features of narrow, curving features of the slot canyons.

== Access ==
Buckskin Gulch is reached via U. S. Route 89 (US‑89) in Utah, roughly halfway between the towns of Kanab, Utah, and Page, Arizona. There are five access routes to the canyon, including Buckskin Trailhead, Wire Pass Trailhead, White House trailhead, and Lee's ferry trailhead.

== Regulations ==
Permits are required for overnight backpacking as well as day hiking in Buckskin Gulch and the Paria Canyon-Vermilion Cliffs Wilderness. Permits can be obtained from the Bureau of Land Management (BLM) official website.

Only twenty overnight permits per day are allowed, and group sizes are limited to ten people. Campfires are prohibited, and human waste cannot be buried and must be packed out in order to preserve the condition of the environment.

== See also ==
- List of rivers of Utah
- Antelope Canyon
