= Canoga Park, Los Angeles =

Neighborhood in California, US

- Neighborhood of Los Angeles
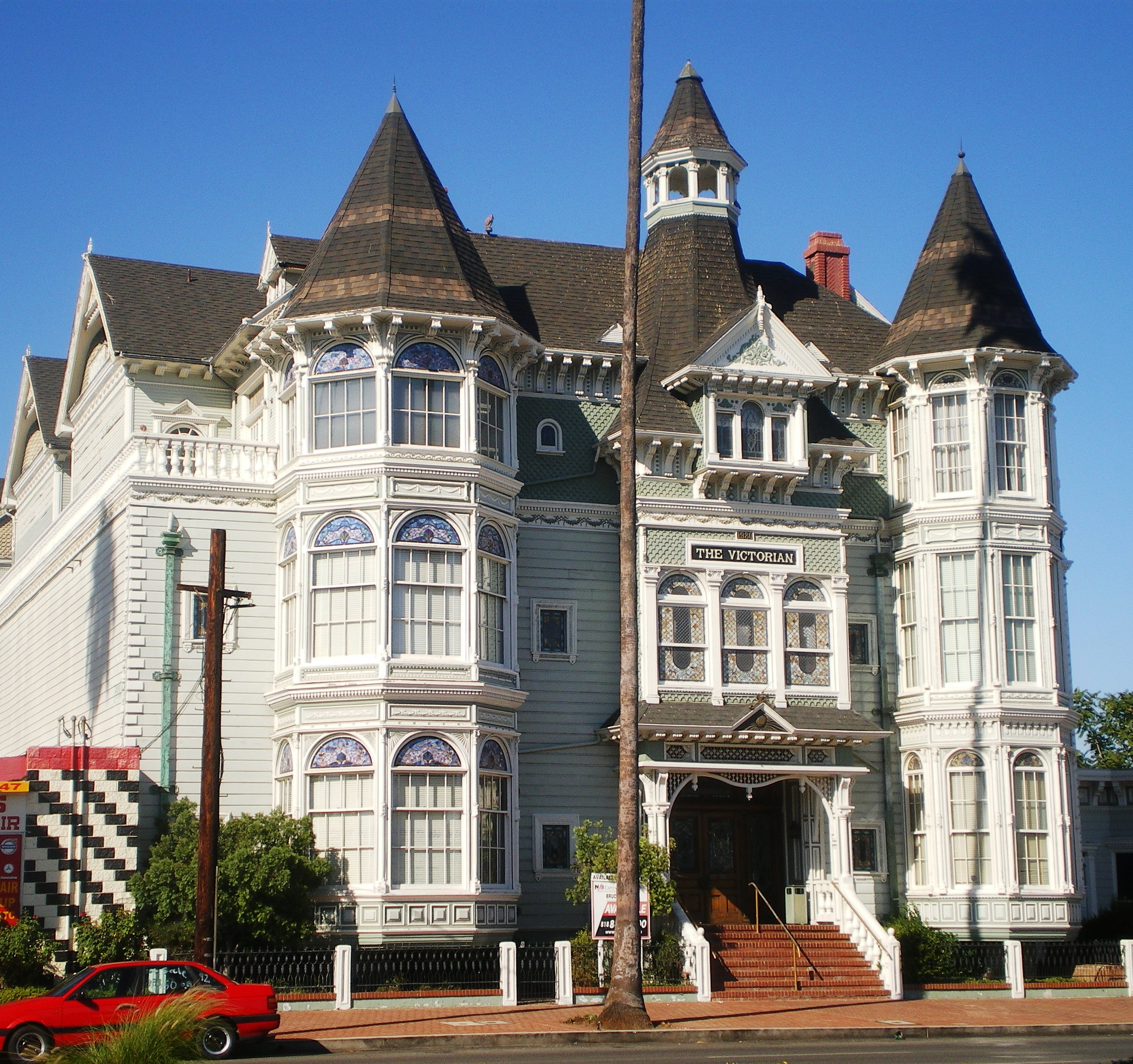
- The Platt Building, also known as The Victorian — a c. 1970s office building at 19725 Sherman Way, Canoga Park−Winnetka, photo taken in 2008

- Location within Los Angeles/San Fernando Valley Canoga Park, Los Angeles (the Los Angeles metropolitan area)
- Coordinates: 34.20111°N 118.59722°W
- Country: United States
- State: California
- County: Los Angeles County
- City: Los Angeles
- Owensmouth: 1912
- Canoga Park: 1931
- Named for: Canoga, New York

Area
  - Land: 4.4 sq mi (11.3 km^{2})
- Elevation: 797 ft (243 m)

Population
  - Total: 60,971
- Time zone: UTC−8 (PST)
  - Summer (DST): UTC−7 (PDT)
- ZIP Codes: 91303, 91304, 91305, 91309
- Area codes: 818, 747

Canoga Park is a neighborhood in the city of Los Angeles, California, located in the San Fernando Valley. Before the Mexican–American War, the neighborhood was part of a rancho, and after the American victory it was converted into wheat farms and then subdivided, with part of it named Owensmouth as a town founded in 1912. It was annexed by Los Angeles in 1917 and was renamed Canoga Park on March 1, 1931, after Canoga, New York.

== History ==
=== Pre-American history ===
The area of present-day Canoga Park was the homeland of Native Americans in the Tongva-Fernandeño and Chumash-Venturaño tribes, that lived in the Simi Hills and along to the tributaries of the Los Angeles River. They traded with the north Valley Tataviam-Fernandeño people. Native American civilizations inhabited the Valley for an estimated 8,000 years. Their culture left the Burro Flats Painted Cave nearby.

From 1797 to 1846, the area was part of Mission San Fernando Rey de España (Mission San Fernando). After the Mexican War of Independence from Spain the 'future Canoga Park' land became part of Rancho Ex-Mission San Fernando. In 1845, a land grant for the separate and historically rich Rancho El Escorpión was issued by Governor Pío Pico to three Chumash people, Odón Eusebia, his brother-in-law Urbano, and Urbano's son Mañuel. It was located in the area west of Fallbrook Avenue and later called Platt Ranch.

=== American history ===
In 1863, the syndicate San Fernando Homestead Association led by Isaac Lankershim and Isaac Van Nuys purchased the southern half of the historic San Fernando Valley. They established seven wheat ranch operations and were the first to ship wheat to Europe from California. In 1869, Alfred Workman acquired the westernmost ranch, a 13,000 acres (50 km^{2}) wheat farm in future Canoga Park (for more: See Landmarks section below). Eucalyptus trees were introduced into the San Fernando Valley by Albert Workman, who imported seedlings from his native Australia and planted them on the Workman Ranch. In time, they spread through the Canoga Park area ranches, farms and beyond. It has been said that these trees are the parents of all eucalyptus trees in Southern California.

The entire south San Fernando Valley, from Roscoe Boulevard south to the hills, with certain exceptions, were to be subdivided in anticipation of the Los Angeles aqueduct's completion in 1913. The purchasers of the land included Harry Chandler and Harrison Gray Otis of the Los Angeles Times, Moses Sherman (a Los Angeles Pacific Railroad streetcar line builder), and Hobart Johnstone Whitley, an all purpose real estate developer who, from a start in the Land Rush of 1889 in Oklahoma to platting out 140 towns, including Hollywood.

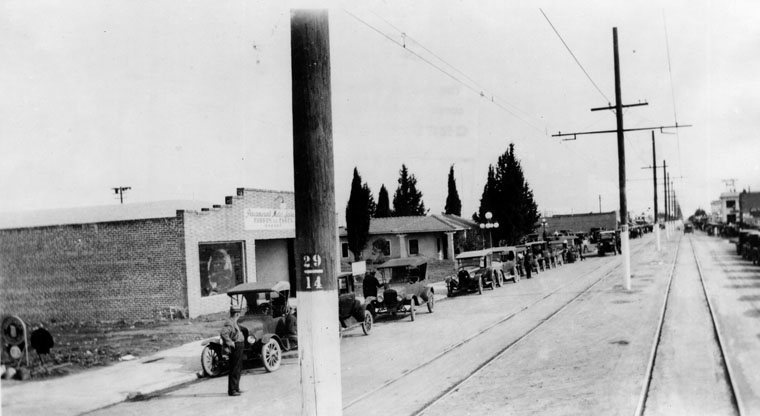
1920 Sherman Way in downtown Owensmouth, with Los Angeles Pacific Railroad lines visible at right

The area was originally named Owensmouth by Los Angeles Suburban Home Company by general manager Hobart Johnstone Whitley as a sales tactic in that the town would be the new mouth of the Owens River, after the Los Angeles Aqueduct would be completed the next year. The town was founded on March 30, 1912, and the Suburban Home Company contracted with the Janss Investment Company, to sell properties. A pre-development scheme brought Pacific Electric streetcars and an all purpose highway (Sherman Way) out all the way from Hollywood through Cahuenga Pass, through the previously subdivided Van Nuys (1911). Highlighting the "opening day barbecue" was the display of the "Owensmouth Baby", a racecar that could go up and down the paved Sherman Way at the incredible speed of 35 mph.

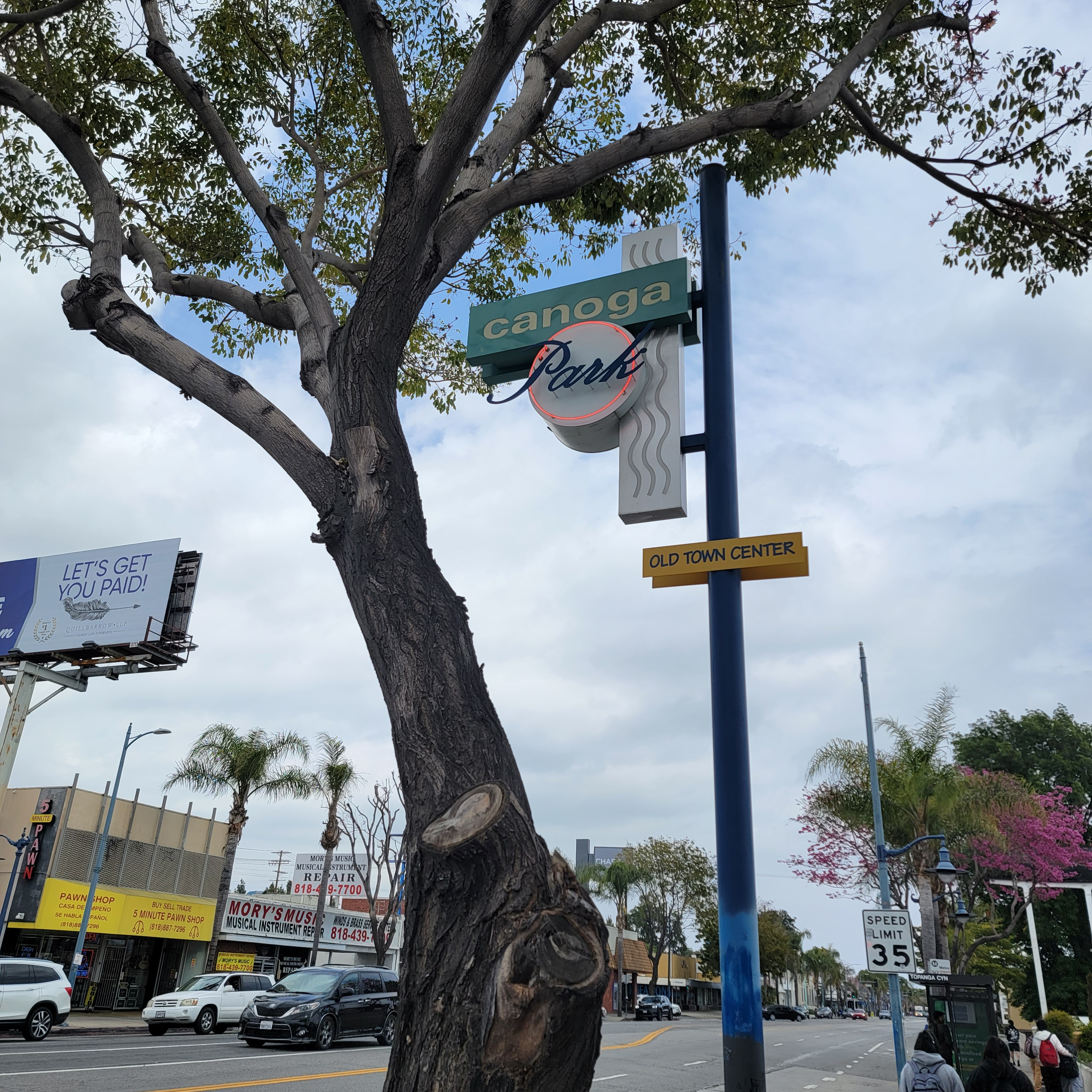
A sign for Canoga Park's old town center on Sherman Way

Owensmouth, as the junior San Fernando Valley city to Van Nuys, promoted itself with the "baby" motif—using storks in their advertisement. The "baby city" of the Valley remained a very small community.

The lack of an independent water supply made annexation to the City of Los Angeles inevitable, and on February 26, 1917, it joined with its larger neighbor. The name was changed to Canoga Park in 1931, thanks to the efforts of local civic leader Mary Logan Orcutt. Eventually, the area's zoning was rural/agricultural and its industry was small farms involved in the production of fruits, vegetables, and melons, some livestock, horses, a movie/television studio, and a stunt location.

The Canoga Park Airstrip occupied the area now known as "Warner Center" (as shown on the street map 1955 Thomas Guide).

== Annual events ==
=== Memorial Day Parade ===
Canoga Park has hosted a Memorial Day Parade for over three decades. The parade is organized by local representatives from the Canoga Park Community Center and local business leaders. It pays tribute to fallen servicemen and women from all branches of the U.S. Armed Forces. A flyover by the Condor Squadron serves as the kickoff of the parade. A special ceremony for fallen heroes from Canoga Park High School, including those dating back to World War II is part of the opening presentation. The parade route goes along Sherman Way.

=== Día de los Muertos Family Festival ===
Founded in 2000, the festival celebrated its 25th anniversary in 2025. It is one of the biggest Day of the Dead celebrations in the San Fernando Valley.The festival spans eight city blocks along Sherman Way between Topanga Canyon Blvd. and Canoga Ave and is attended by thousands of people. The festival happens on the first Sunday of November every year. The day long event includes live music, altars, art, food, children's activities, a catrina contest and a classic car show featuring lowriders, motorcycles and low rider bicycles.

== Aerospace industry ==
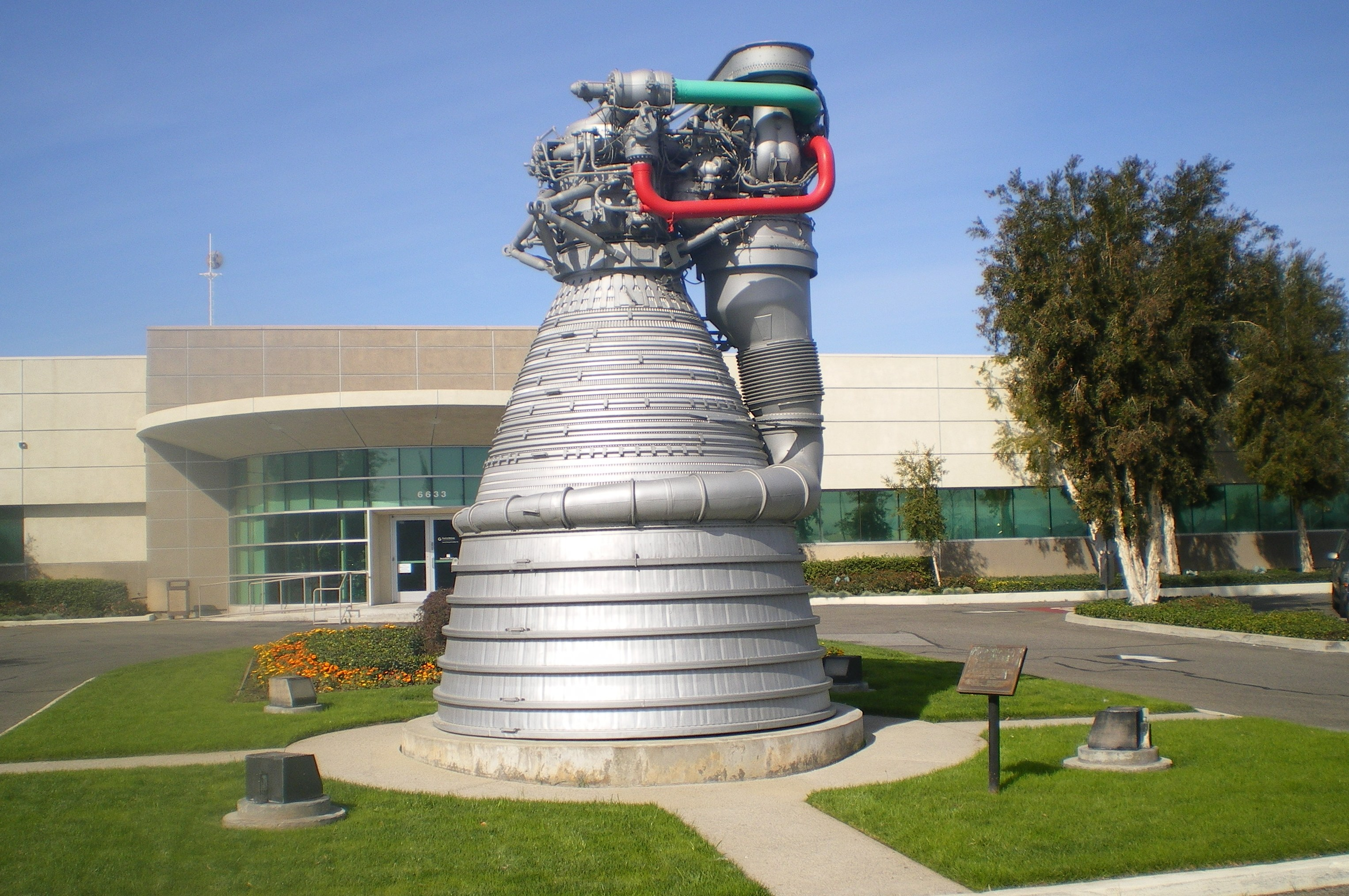
Aerojet Rocketdyne Division

In 1955, Rocketdyne, then a division of North American Aviation (NAA), moved into the area and built its main manufacturing facility in Canoga Park. The facility became a major employer along with the Atomics International and Santa Susana Field Laboratory (SSFL) divisions of NAA. Other aerospace companies followed: including Thompson Ramo Wooldridge-TRW, Hughes Aircraft, Rockwell International, Boeing, and Teledyne. Small machine shops and other ancillary businesses also sprang up to service the aerospace industry. The Rocketdyne facility was in the end operated by Aerojet Rocketdyne, who moved out of Canoga Park in 2014. Demolition and site clearing of the former Rocketdyne facility in Canoga Park commenced in August 2016. The Santa Susana Field Lab property has also been closed and will be undergoing an extensive environmental cleanup, and become an open-space park.

In 1987, much of the western district of Canoga Park was renamed West Hills. On June 25, 2005, Canoga Park was named an All-America City a first for the city of Los Angeles.

The use of toxic chemicals like trichloroethylene and tetrachloroethene as cleaning solvents during production by aerospace and defense contractor companies in their Canoga Park industrial facilities led to groundwater pollution on their sites and across the neighborhood.

Since 2003, environmental testing on a former Litton Industries, later Northrop Grumman, industrial site revealed unsafe levels of toxic chemicals on the site; 2007 tests further revealed that toxins had spread to an area beyond the site. In 2021, a petition for a class action against Northrop Grumman on behalf of affected residents was filed. The petition sought monetary compensation for losses in property value and called on Northrop Grumman to mitigate the contamination, alleging that the chemicals had leaked from the site and contaminated groundwater under 3,200 properties in an area about 2.4 miles long and 1.8 miles wide and that the corporation failed to properly contain or remediate the damage after it acquired the site in 2001. The corporation argued that they had complied with the California State Water Resources Control Board and that the Board had approved their actions.

A June 2024 report on soil vapor and groundwater inspections conducted near the vacant Rocketdyne site, delivered to the California State Water Resources Control Board on behalf of RTX Corporation, reported levels of toxic cleaning solvents that were above levels that could pose a threat to the environment and human health. According to the LA Times in August, several residents of apartments which had been inspected reported that they were not notified of the testing nor of test results. The Water Board confirmed that they were reviewing the report and responded about 7,000 individuals in residences and businesses within 500 feet of the site were notified. The Board also reported that they had notified some 4,000 Canoga Park residents about exposure to toxic chemicals from the former Litton Industries site.

== Geography ==
Canoga Park is bordered by Woodland Hills on the south, West Hills on the west, Chatsworth on the north, and Winnetka on the east.

Bell and Dayton Creeks flowing from the Simi Hills, and Arroyo Calabasas (Calabasas Creek) from the Santa Monica Mountains are several of the headwaters of the Los Angeles River that originate in the western San Fernando Valley that flow through Canoga Park. The Los Angeles River itself begins at the confluence of Calabasas Creek and Bell Creek behind Canoga Park High School. These and other small creeks supply storm water and suburban runoff water to the Los Angeles River, and several are considered year round creeks. Although the creeks are now channeled and run within concrete walls, they do form a significant urban wildlife landscape and contribute to the population of indigenous wildlife left within the San Fernando Valley.

=== Climate ===
This area experiences hot and very dry summers. According to the Köppen Climate Classification system, Canoga Park has a hot-summer Mediterranean climate, abbreviated Csa on climate maps. Precipitation is more common from December to March. Temperatures in the daily high range from 19 °C (66 °F) to 34 °C. Daily low temperatures range from 5 °C (41 °F) to 14 °C.

Climate data for Canoga Park, Los Angeles
Month	Jan	Feb	Mar	Apr	May	Jun	Jul	Aug	Sep	Oct	Nov	Dec	Year
Mean daily maximum °F (°C)	67 (19)	69 (21)	71 (22)	77 (25)	80 (27)	87 (31)	94 (34)	95 (35)	91 (33)	84 (29)	74 (23)	68 (20)	80 (27)
Mean daily minimum °F (°C)	41 (5)	42 (6)	43 (6)	46 (8)	50 (10)	54 (12)	57 (14)	58 (14)	56 (13)	51 (11)	43 (6)	40 (4)	48 (9)
Average precipitation inches (mm)	3.95 (100)	4.11 (104)	3.52 (89)	0.83 (21)	0.28 (7.1)	0.06 (1.5)	0.01 (0.25)	0.16 (4.1)	0.24 (6.1)	0.57 (14)	1.41 (36)	2.17 (55)	17.32 (440)

== Population ==
The 2000 U.S. census counted 53,227 residents in the 4.35-square-mile (11.3 km^{2}) Canoga Park neighborhood—or 12,240 people per square mile, about an average population density for the city. In 2008, the city estimated that the population had increased to 60,578. In 2000, the median age for residents was 30, also about average for city and county neighborhoods.

The neighborhood was considered "highly diverse" ethnically within Los Angeles. The breakdown was 50.9% Latino; 30.7% White; 11.1% Asian; 4.3% Black; and 3.1% other. Mexico (45.8%) and El Salvador (11.6%) were the most common places of birth for the 42.8% of the residents who were born abroad—which was about an average percentage for Los Angeles as a whole.

The median yearly household income in 2008 dollars was $51,601, considered average for the city. Renters occupied 63.6% of the housing stock, and house- or apartment-owners held 36.4%. The average household size of three people was average for Los Angeles. The 18.1% of families headed by single parents was also average for city neighborhoods.

The percentage of residents aged 19 to 34 was among the county's highest, as was the percentage of never-married men (40.4%).

== Economy ==
Main Street Canoga Park is the historical designation for downtown Canoga Park along Sherman Way. The area was once known as "Antique Alley" and has a lot of vintage boutiques, coffee shops and art.

The Madrid Theatre is scheduled to open in 2027.

Canoga Park is the headquarters of electronic provider Electro Rent.

== Government ==
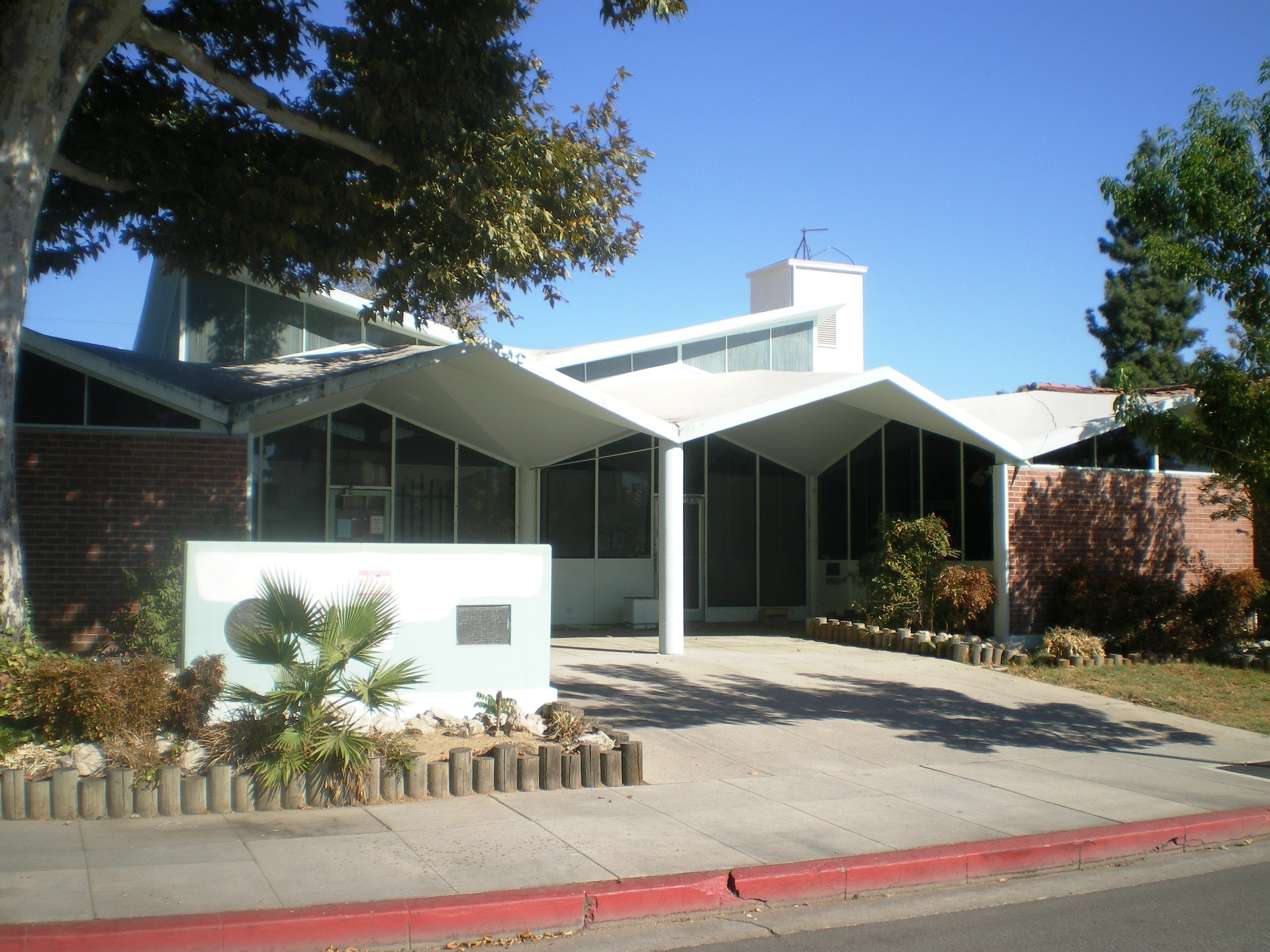
CDI Early Learning Center, originally the Canoga Park Branch Library

=== Police ===
Los Angeles Police Department Topanga Community Police Station serves residents in Canoga Park, parts of Winnetka, West Hills, and Woodland Hills. The Topanga Community Police Station opened in January 2009. The police department named the station after a village in the Tongva language of the historically local Tongva-Fernandeño Native Americans tribe. The department originally planned to name it the Northwest Station, but residents preferred a name linking to the town's history. Prior to the opening of the Topanga station, the Devonshire Community Police Station served addresses north of Roscoe Boulevard while the West Valley Police Station served addresses south of Roscoe Boulevard.

=== Post offices ===
The United States Postal Service operates the Canoga Park Post Office at 8201 Canoga Avenue and the Challenger Post Office at 21801 Sherman Way. Challenger Station maintains a significant WPA mural by Western artist Maynard Dixon.

=== Public libraries ===
The Los Angeles Public Library operates the Canoga Park Branch Library at 20939 Sherman Way.

=== Federal representation ===
- Canoga Park is represented in the United States Senate by Senator Caroline Menjivar
- Canoga Park is located within California's 32nd congressional district represented by Democrat Brad Sherman.

=== State representation ===
Canoga Park is located within California's 46th State Assembly district represented by Democrat Jesse Gabriel and California's 27th State Senate district represented by Democrat Henry Stern.

=== Local representation ===
Canoga Park is located within Los Angeles City Council District 3 represented by Bob Blumenfield.

== Parks and recreation ==
- Lanark Recreation Center, formerly Orcutt Park, is an LA City park in Canoga Park (21816 Lanark Street and Topanga Canyon Boulevard, 91304). The center has a lighted baseball diamond, an unlighted baseball diamond, lighted indoor basketball courts, lighted outdoor basketball courts, a children's play area, a lighted football field, an indoor gymnasium (without weights), picnic tables, a lighted soccer field, lighted tennis courts, lighted volleyball courts, and an auditorium. It also serves as a Los Angeles Police Department drop-in site.
- Lanark Pool, an outdoor unheated seasonal pool, is on the park site.

== Education ==
Eighteen percent of Canoga Park residents age 25 and older had earned a four-year degree by 2000, an average figure for the city and the county.

Schools within the Canoga Park borders are:

=== Public ===
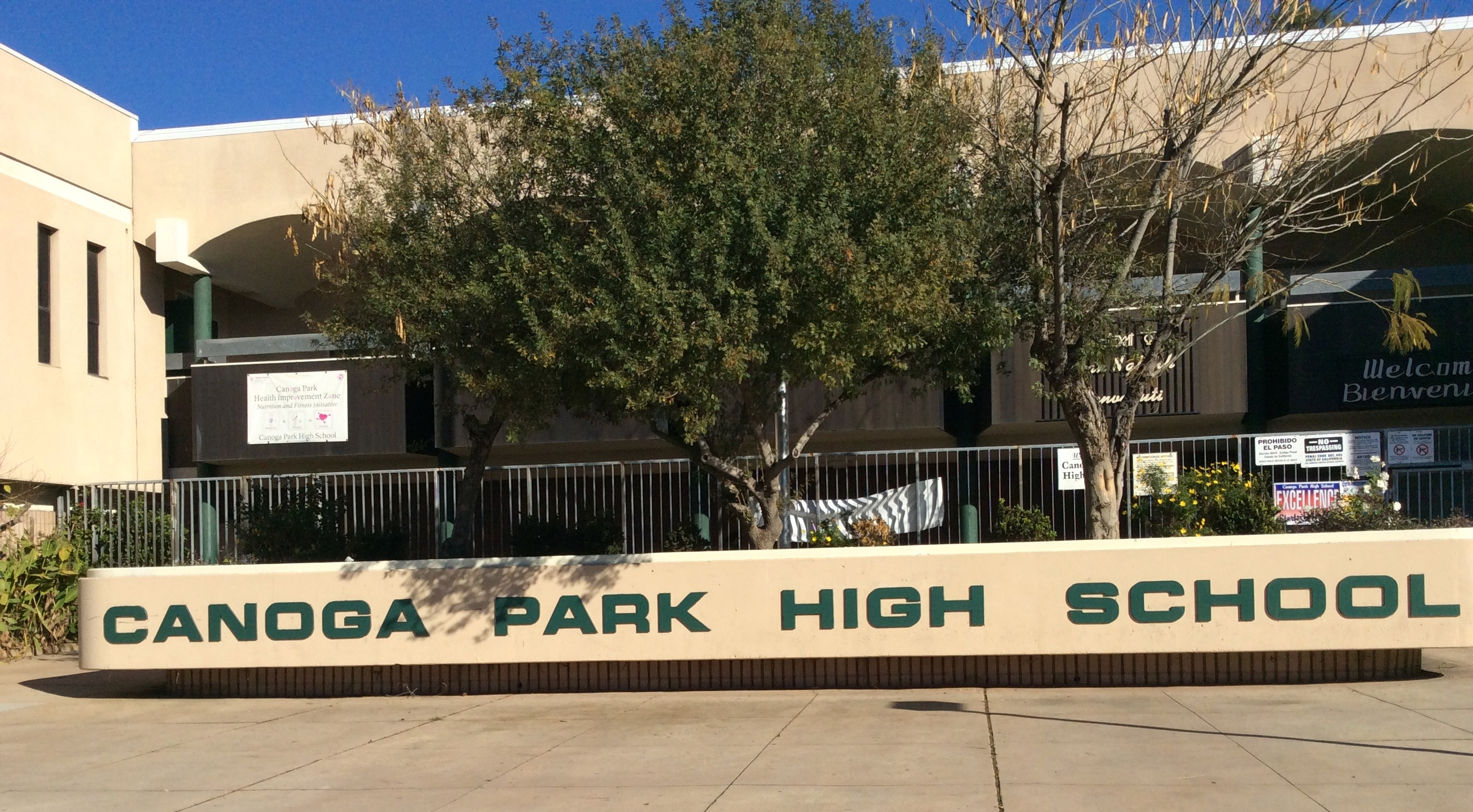
Canoga Park High School

Los Angeles Unified School District serves the community.

- Canoga Park High School, 6850 Topanga Canyon Boulevard
- Owensmouth Continuation School, 6921 Jordan Avenue
- Canoga Park Middle School, 22250 Elkwood Street
- Canoga Park Elementary School, 7438 Topanga Canyon Boulevard
- Multicultural Learning Center, charter, 7510 DeSoto Avenue
- N.E.W. Academy Canoga Park, 21425 Cohasset Street
- Hart Street Elementary School, 21040 Hart Street

=== Private ===
- Canoga Park Preschool and Kindergarten, 7839 Topanga Canyon Boulevard
- Faith Baptist School, K–12, 7644 Farralone Avenue
- AGBU Manoogian-Demirdjian School, K–12, 6844 Oakdale Avenue
- Canoga Park Lutheran School, elementary, 7357 Jordan Avenue. Formed by the merger of Trinity Lutheran High School and Canoga Park Lutheran School
- Coutin School, Inc. (special needs learning) 7119 Owensmouth Avenue
- Our Lady of the Valley Elementary School, 22041 Gault Street

== Notable people ==
- Dorsey Burnette (1932–1979), singer-songwriter
- Bob Burns (1890–1956), comedian, actor
- Bryan Cranston (b. 1956), actor
- Mustafa T. Kasubhai, first Muslim-American federal judge in the United States
- Francis Lederer (1899–2000), actor, honorary mayor of Canoga Park
- Meghan, Duchess of Sussex (b. 1981), member of the British royal family and former actress
- Eric Nolte, (b. 1964), former pitcher for the San Diego Padres
- Jimmy Osmond, (b. 1963), singer, businessman, actor, entertainer; the only member of The Osmonds not to have been born on their hometown of Ogden, Utah
- Eugene Selznick (1930–2012), volleyball player
- Mark Turenshine (1944–2016), American-Israeli basketball player
- Randy Wolf (b. 1976), baseball player

== See also ==
- Rancho El Escorpión
- History of the San Fernando Valley to 1915
