= Edith Hamlin =

American painter (1902–1992)

- Hamlin, photo by Sonya Noskowiak
- Born: June 23, 1902; Oakland, California, US
- Died: February 18, 1992 (aged 89); San Francisco, California, US
- Education: California School of Fine Arts; Columbia University
- Known for: Painting, murals
- Movement: Social realism
- Spouse(s): Albert Barrows (1933–1936); Maynard Dixon (1937–1946)

Edith Ann Hamlin (June 23, 1902 – February 18, 1992) was an American landscape and portrait painter, and muralist. She is known for her social realism murals created while working with the Public Works of Art Project, Federal Art Project and the Section of Painting and Sculpture during the Great Depression era in the United States and for her decorative style paintings of the American desert.

== Biography ==
Born in Oakland, California, she was exposed to art by her father, Charles Hamlin, who took her on sketching trips as a small child. Hamlin won a scholarship to the California School of Fine Arts (1922–1924) and later attended the Teachers College at Columbia University from 1929 until 1932.

She maintained a studio in San Diego throughout the 1920s. In 1933, Hamlin established a studio in San Francisco, and was briefly married to artist Albert Barrows. By 1936 they divorced.

During the early 1930s, she traveled around New Mexico and Arizona. She was selected to paint murals for the Public Works of Art Project at the Coit Tower, and completed a WPA Federal Art Project mural for Mission High School in San Francisco. On the second floor of Coit Tower, she completed a mural named "Sports and Hunting in California". It currently has limited public access due to its location. She worked with Maynard Dixon on the murals, and married him in 1937, after she divorced her first husband in 1936.

She also painted for the Department of the Interior Building in Washington, DC.

Hamlin completed another project for the WPA as she painted two large murals for the Mission High School (San Francisco).

She and Dixon moved to Tucson in 1939 and maintained a summer home in Mt. Carmel, Utah. In Tucson, she completed numerous public murals including two for the Santa Fe Railroad. After Dixon died in 1946, Hamlin had his ashes buried on a hill near their house where she also constructed a studio for herself. She married the artist Frank Knight Dale who did not live long and she returned to San Francisco in 1953, where she died in 1992.

== Legacy ==
The Maynard and Edith Hamlin Dixon House and Studio, operated by the Thunderbird Foundation, offers guided tours by appointment of their home and studio in Mount Carmel, Utah. Their house has been on the Register of Historic Places since 2002.

== Notable work ==
=== Arizona projects and murals ===
- Grand Canyon Pueblo & Taos Pueblo, Painted in the Tucson Medical Center Old Administration Building for Santa Fe Railroad Chicago City Ticket Office, Oil and Canvas 1947. Buck Weaver and Milford Zornes assisting.
- The Legend of Sun and Earth, Arizona Biltmore Hotel Dining Room; Phoenix, Arizona, Oil and Canvas, 1949.
- Christ and the Children, St. Ambrose Catholic Church; Tucson, Arizona, Ethyl Silicate, 1950. (Over Painted)
- Fray Marcos de Niza on an Exploration Trip to Arizona, Jacome's Department Store; Tucson, Arizona, Steel-Reinforced Concrete, 1951 with Jack Maul, Ettore DeGrazia and George Hardy assisting (Jacome donated the pieces to the city, and it now hang at the Tucson Convention Center, one at the west entrance and the other outside the Leo Rich Theatre).
- Tucson in the ‘70s’ Old Pueblo Club; Tucson, Arizona, Oil and Panel, 1952.

=== California projects and murals ===
- Mission San Francisco de Asis, (painted with Jay Risling assisting), Mission High School Library, San Francisco, California
- Civilization Through the Arts and Crafts as Taught to the Neophyte Indians, (painted with Betty Willey), Mission High School Library, San Francisco, California
- Sports and Hunting in California mural, Coit Tower, San Francisco, California
- Overland Pioneers, Tracy Post Office, Tracy, California, (painting is now missing)
- Spaniards, Tracy Post Office, Tracy, California
- Days of the First Railroad, Tracy Post Office, Tracy, California

== Gallery ==
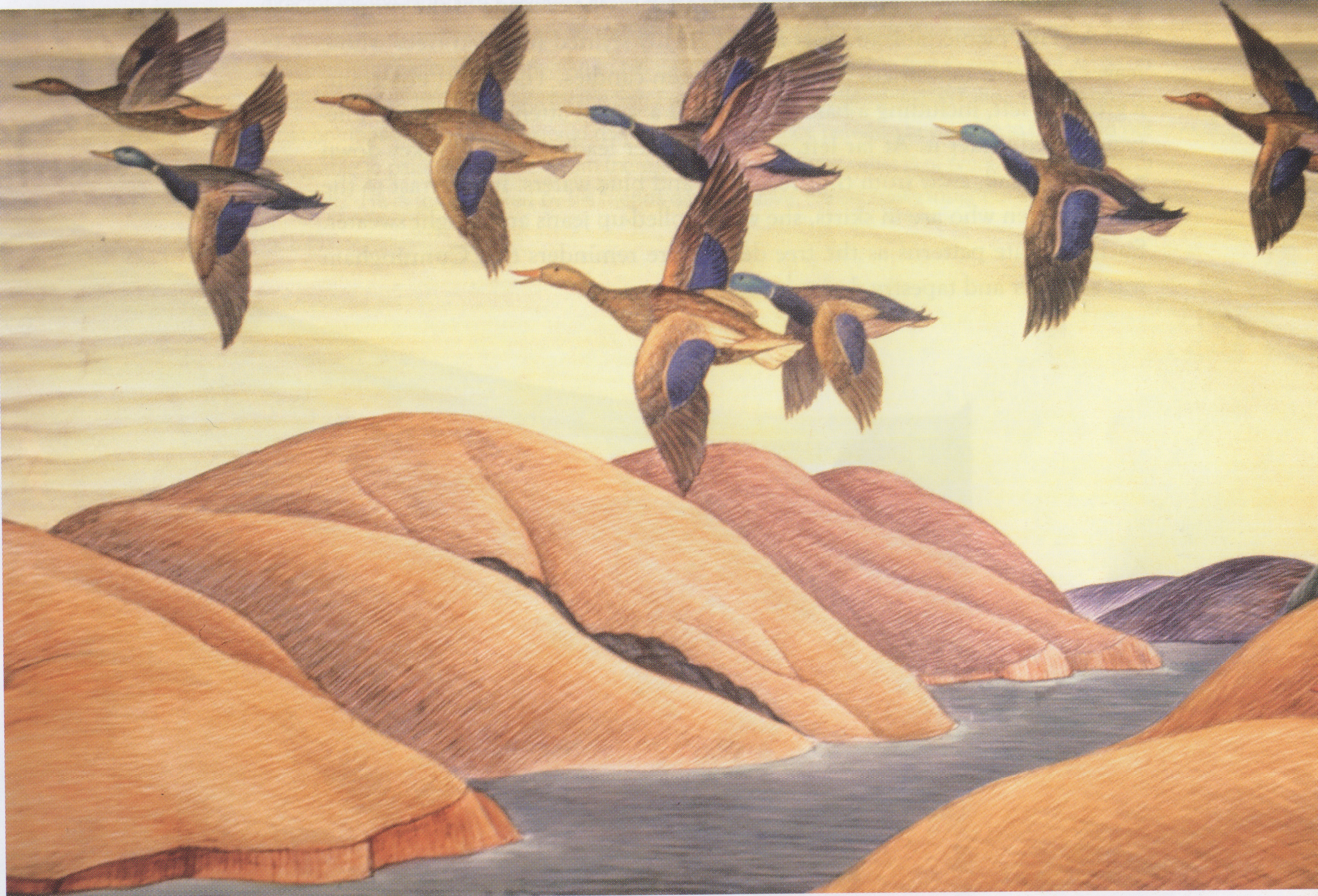
Sports and Hunting in California, Coit Tower

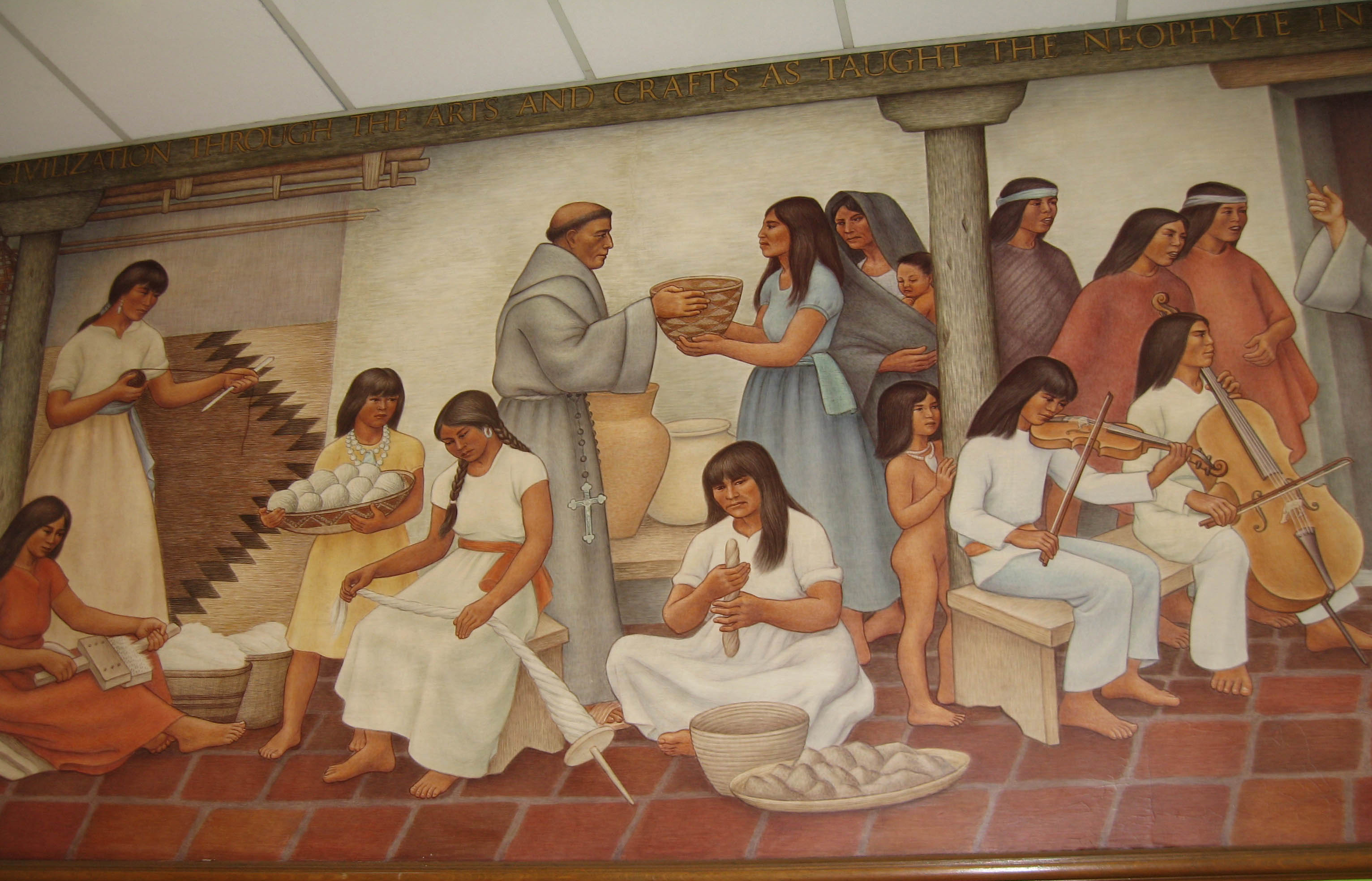
Civilization Through the Arts and Crafts as Taught to the Neophyte Indians, Mission High School

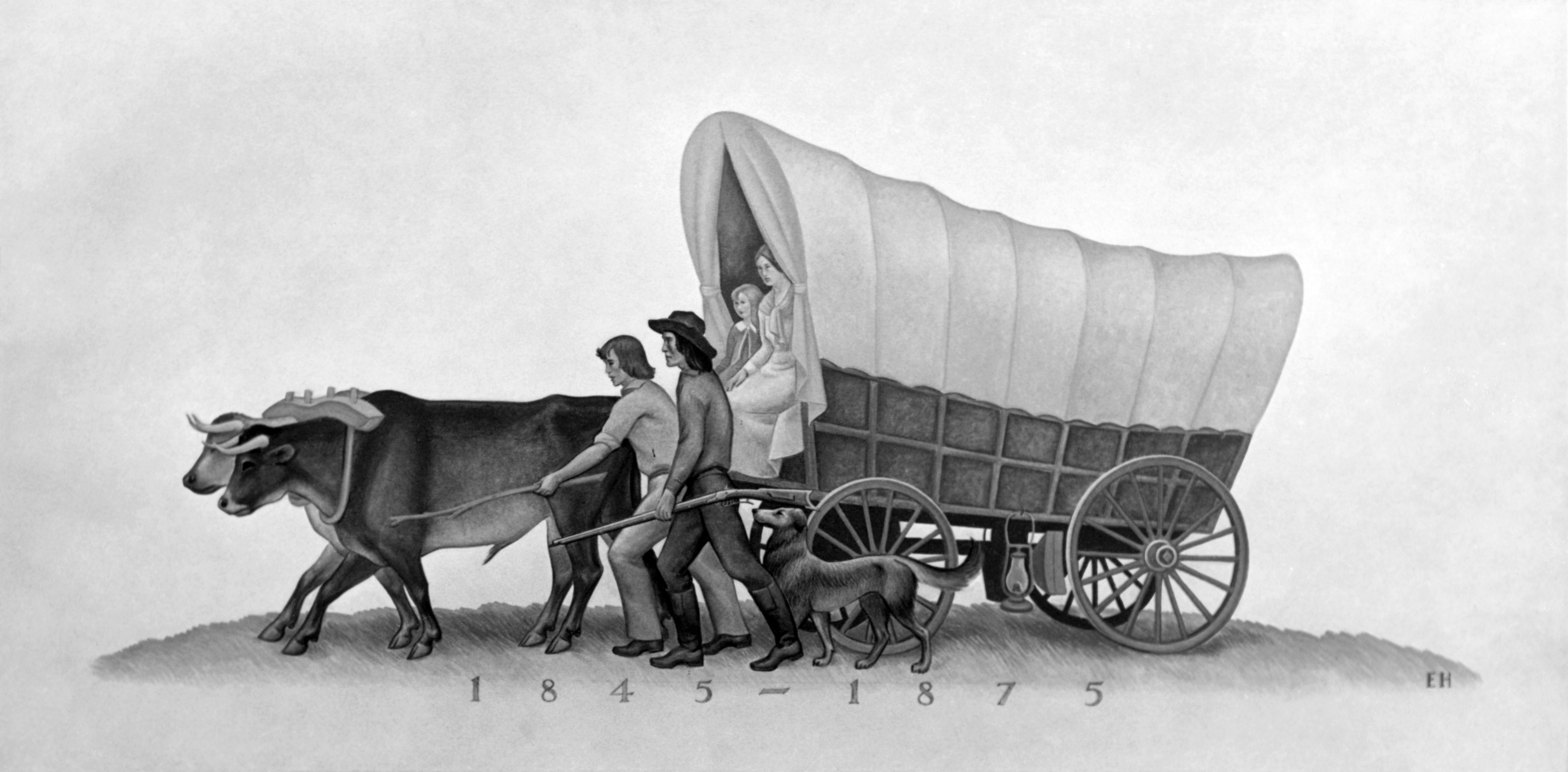
Hamlin's missing 1938 mural for the U.S. post office in Tracy, California

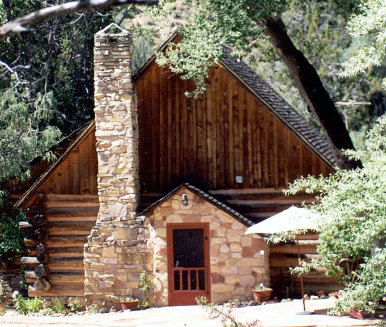
Maynard Dixon and Edith Hamlin's house

== See also ==
- Maynard Dixon, her spouse and fellow muralist
- Maynard and Edith Hamlin Dixon House and Studio
