= Plagiostira gillettei =

Scientific classification
- Kingdom: Animalia
- Phylum: Arthropoda
- Class: Insecta
- Order: Orthoptera
- Suborder: Ensifera
- Family: Tettigoniidae
- Tribe: Plagiostirini
- Genus: Plagiostira
- Species: P. gillettei

Binomial name
- Plagiostira gillettei Caudell, 1907

Species of cricket-like animal

Plagiostira gillettei, or Gillette's shieldback, is a species of shield-backed katydid in the family Tettigoniidae. It is found in North America.

== Subspecies ==
These two subspecies belong to the species Plagiostira gillettei:

- Plagiostira gillettei gillettei Caudell, 1907
- Plagiostira gillettei utahensis Tinkham, 1962 Coral Pink Sand Dunes Shieldback, endemic to the Coral Pink Sand Dunes in Kane County, Utah.
