= Plagiostira =

Scientific classification
- Domain: Eukaryota
- Kingdom: Animalia
- Phylum: Arthropoda
- Class: Insecta
- Order: Orthoptera
- Suborder: Ensifera
- Family: Tettigoniidae
- Subfamily: Tettigoniinae
- Tribe: Plagiostirini; Storozhenko, 1994
- Genus: Plagiostira; Scudder, 1876

Genus of cricket-like animals

Plagiostira is a North American genus of shield-backed katydids in the family Tettigoniidae. There are at least three described species in Plagiostira. It is the only genus in the monotypic tribe Plagiostirini Storozhenko, 1994.

== Species ==
These three species belong to the genus Plagiostira:

- Plagiostira albonotata Scudder, 1876 (white-marked shieldback) - type species
- Plagiostira gillettei Caudell, 1907 (Gillette's shieldback)
- Plagiostira mescaleroensis Tinkham, 1960 (mescalero shieldback)
