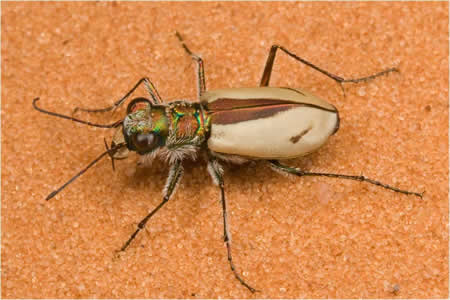

Conservation status
- Critically Imperiled (NatureServe)

Scientific classification
- Domain: Eukaryota
- Kingdom: Animalia
- Phylum: Arthropoda
- Class: Insecta
- Order: Coleoptera
- Suborder: Adephaga
- Family: Cicindelidae
- Genus: Cicindela
- Species: C. albissima

Binomial name
- Cicindela albissima Rumpp, 1962

= Cicindela albissima =

Species of beetle

Cicindela albissima, commonly called the Coral Pink Sand Dunes tiger beetle is a species of tiger beetle endemic to Coral Pink Sand Dunes State Park in southern Utah, United States. It was originally described by Rumpp in 1962 as the subspecies Cicindela limbata albissima, but mitochondrial DNA, along with the species' morphological and geographical distinctiveness, have shown that it is a separate species. C. albissima can be distinguished from other Cicindela species by its restricted range and lack of pigmentation on its elytra.

== Adults ==
Adults are 10.5 millimetres (0.41 in) to 12 millimetres (0.47 in) long and 4.4 millimetres (0.17 in) to 4.7 millimetres (0.19 in) wide, while females are generally larger than males. The thorax is brown to bronze in color, while the elytra have reduced pigmentation and are white in color. Adults primarily eat flies and other arthropods found on the dunes. They also scavenge on dead arthropods blown onto the dunes from surrounding habitats.

Adults begin to emerge from the larval stage in March and reach their peak abundance in mid-April to early May. Adult populations decline through June and disappear by July. Mating and egg laying occur from the time adults emerge in mid-March until they die by July. Some adults can be continue to be found from late August to early October.

Adults are usually active on warm or sunny days. They dig burrows that they use at night and during unfavorable weather. Little evidence of parasitism has been observed on both adults and larvae. Throughout their lives, most adults move only small distances, typically less than 1,000 feet (300 m), although some have been observed to move up to 3,300 feet (1,000 m).

== Larvae ==
After first matings occur in early spring, first instar larvae begin to appear in late spring, usually completing the first instar by late May to June. Most individuals reach second instars by mid summer, and third instars are reached in fall. Larvae hibernate during the winter before emerging as adults the following spring. Larvae are sedentary and live in permanent burrows and feed by using their mandibles to catch arthropods that pass by the mouth of their burrows.

== Distribution ==
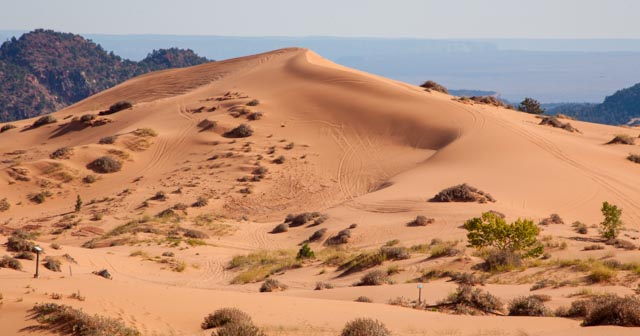
Coral Pink Sand Dunes

Cicindela albissima is endemic to twenty percent of the 3,500-acre (1,400 ha) Coral Pink Sand Dunes, which are within Coral Pink Sand Dunes State Park in Kane County, Utah. Its occupied habitat is about 5,900 feet (1,800 m) long by 1,000 feet (300 m) wide. The dunes are about 7 miles (11 km) west of Kanab, and their southern extent is less than 1 mile (1.6 km) north of the Arizona border.

== Conservation ==
Cicindela albissima has been proposed to be listed as under the Endangered Species Act. It was previously considered a subspecies of Cicindela limbata, but it is over 370 miles (600 km) from any other populations of C. limbata. Its geographic isolation, mtDNA, and morphological differences, particularly the coloration of the elytra and body size, led it to be considered a distinct species.

In 2012, the population of C. albissima was estimated to be 1786 individuals, up from 1116 in 2011. Since annual population surveys began in 1998, the population reached a peak of 2944 in 2002 and a minimum of 558 in 2005. Rainfall is the primary factor controlling the population of C. albissima, and drought is the most severe threat to the species. Off-road vehicle activity has degraded the beetle's habitat, particularly the interdunal swales, which are the habitat where most larvae are found. Vegetation damaged by off-road vehicles can lead to degraded larval habitat and reduced prey abundance. A 370-acre (150 ha) conservation area in which off-road vehicle use is prohibited has been established and covers approximately 80 percent of the beetle's suitable habitat. The conservation area encompassed 87 percent of the beetle's population in 2012, significantly more than in previous years, likely due to the establishment of the conservation area and increased protections within it.
