= Plagiostira albonotata =

Scientific classification
- Domain: Eukaryota
- Kingdom: Animalia
- Phylum: Arthropoda
- Class: Insecta
- Order: Orthoptera
- Suborder: Ensifera
- Family: Tettigoniidae
- Tribe: Plagiostirini
- Genus: Plagiostira
- Species: P. albonotata

Binomial name
- Plagiostira albonotata Scudder, 1876

Species of cricket-like animal

Plagiostira albonotata, the white-marked shieldback, is a species of shield-backed katydid in the family Tettigoniidae. It is found in North America.
