= Canoga Park Post Office =

Building in California, United States

Coordinates: 34°12′05″N 118°36′11″W

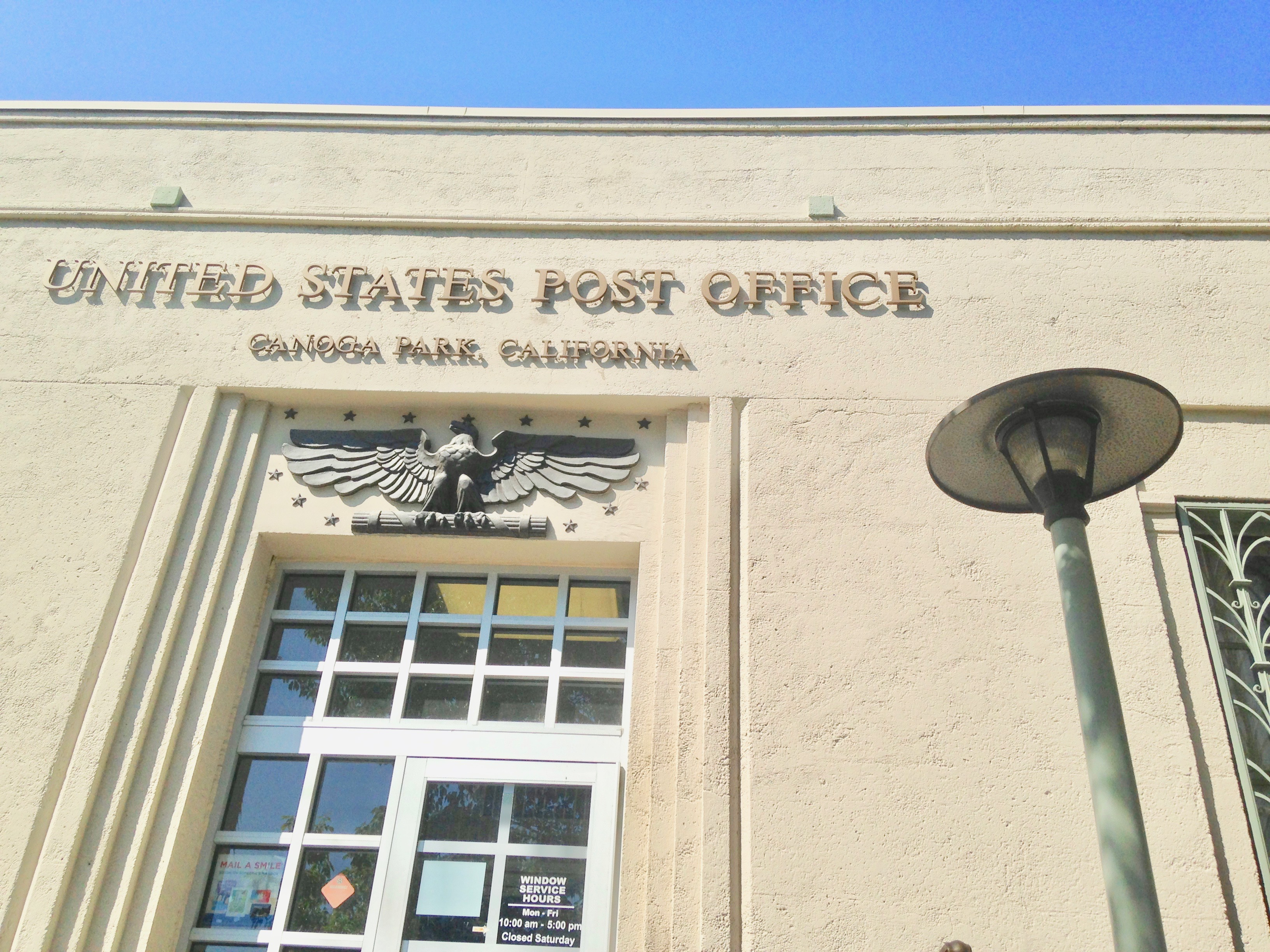
Canoga Park Post Office in Sept. 2015.

The Canoga Park Post Office is a historic post office located at 21801 Sherman Way in Canoga Park, CA. It opened in 1939.

== History ==
The area in which the post office is situated was once called Owensmouth, and there were two post offices for the town. In 1931, the name was changed to Canoga Park and the post offices merged, resulting in the Canoga Park Post Office in 1938. In 1941, Maynard Dixon provided a mural, "Palomino Ponies," for the location. It was his last public mural and was designated as a National Historic Landmark by the National Historical Society. In 1986, the post office was renamed the Challenger Station in honor of the lives lost in the Challenger Space Shuttle launch.

== Gallery ==
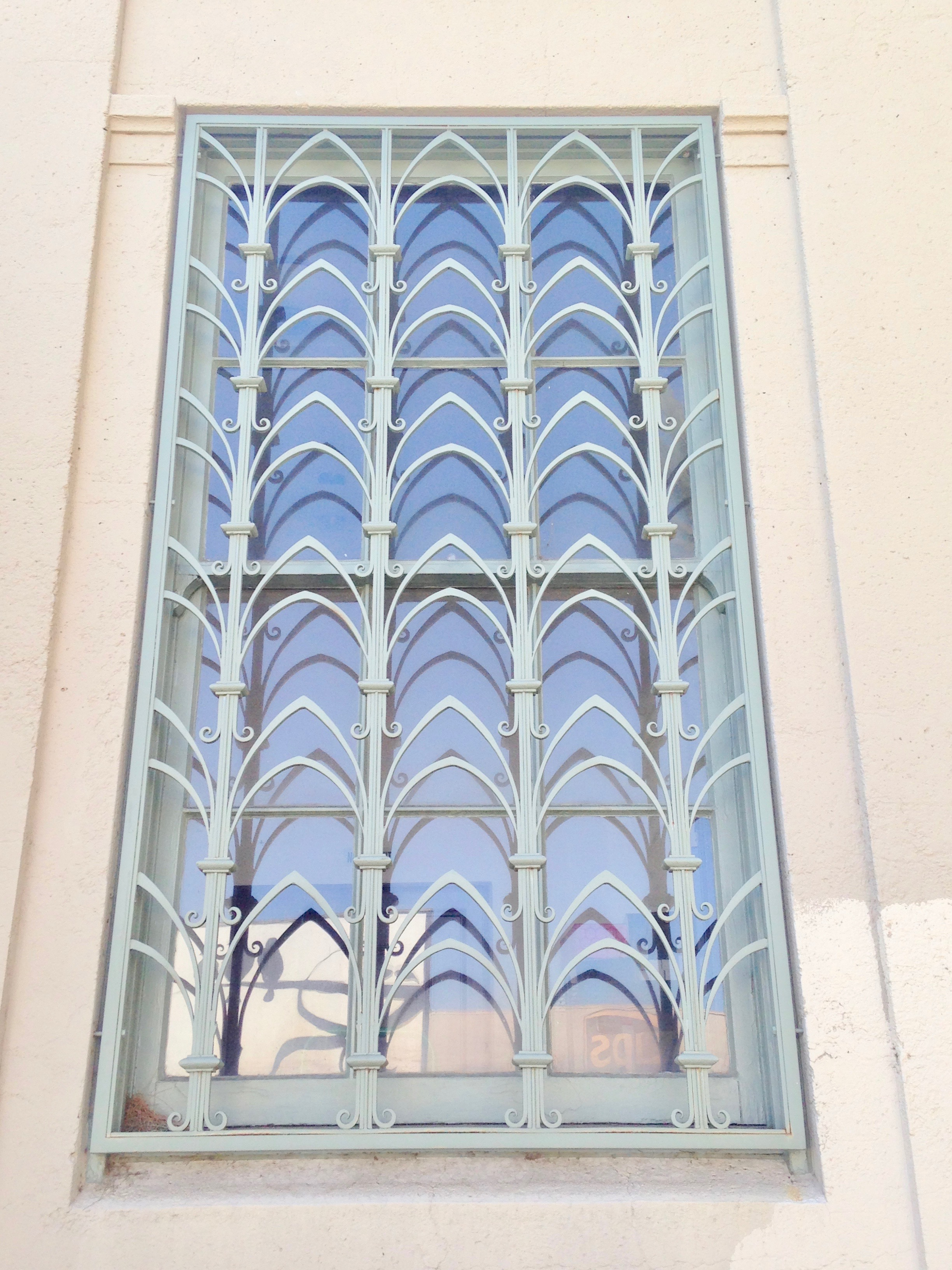

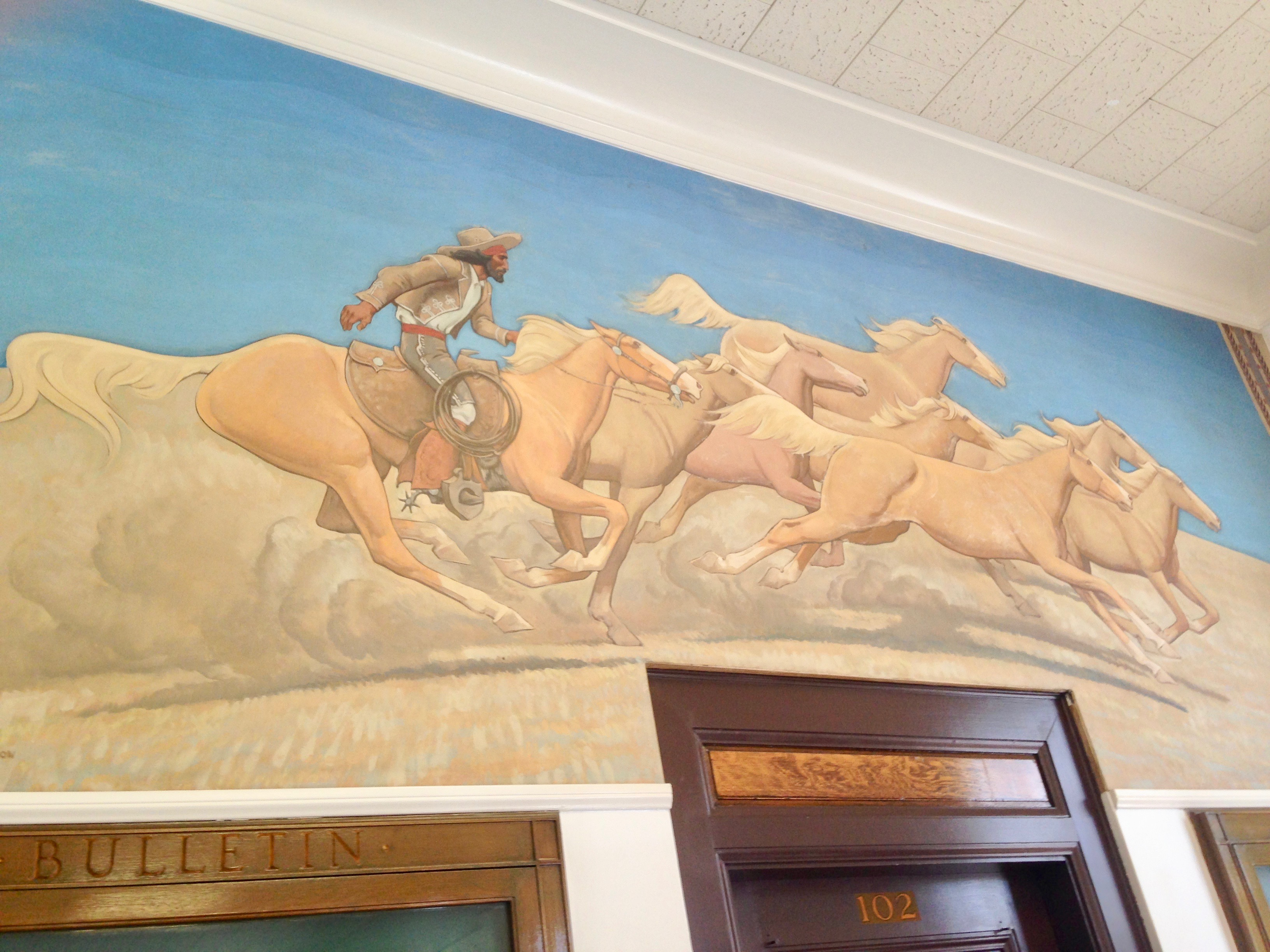
