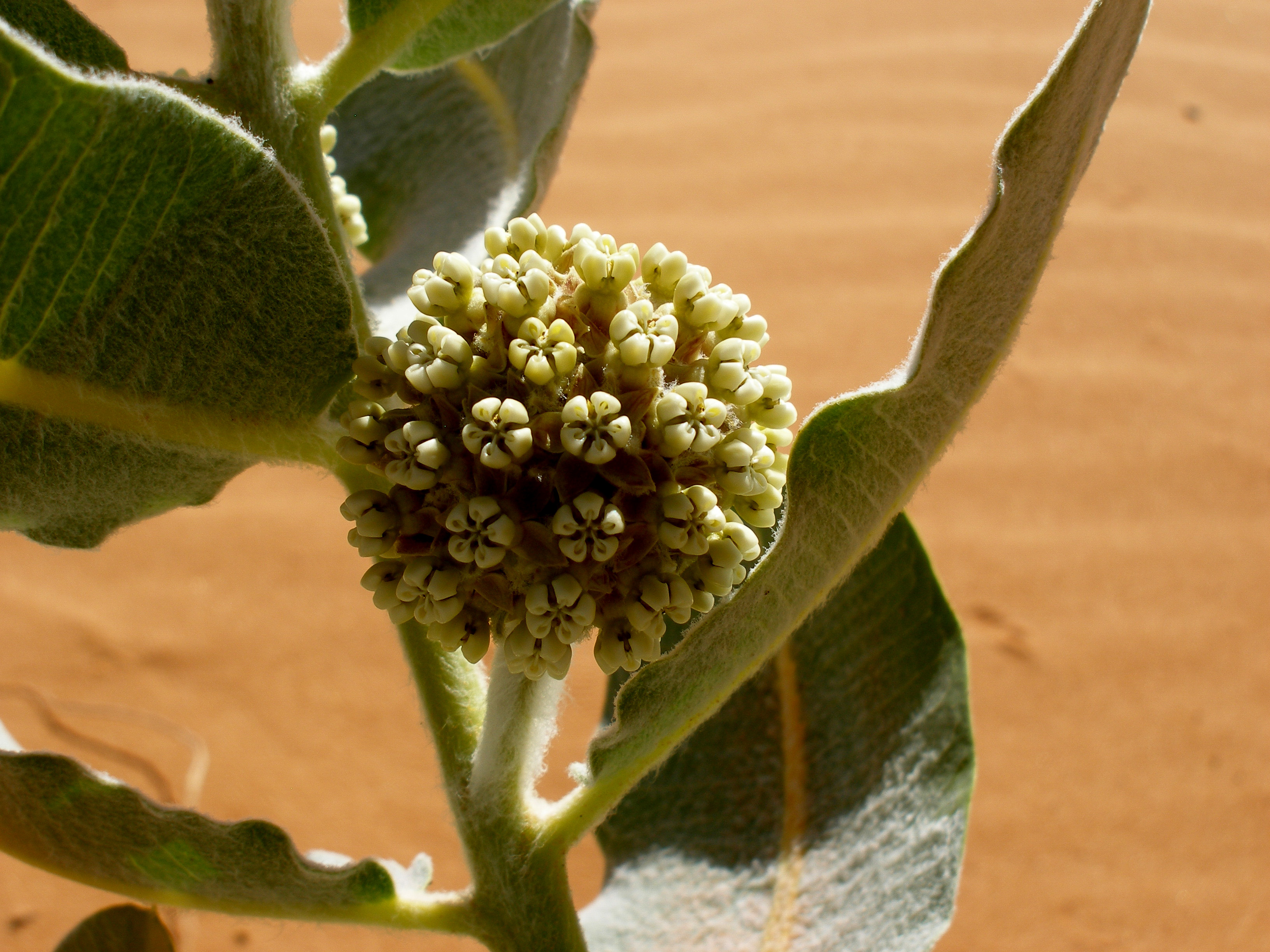

Conservation status
- Critically Imperiled (NatureServe)

Scientific classification
- Kingdom: Plantae
- Clade: Tracheophytes
- Clade: Angiosperms
- Clade: Eudicots
- Clade: Asterids
- Order: Gentianales
- Family: Apocynaceae
- Genus: Asclepias
- Species: A. welshii

Binomial name
- Asclepias welshii N.H.Holmgren & P.K.Holmgren

= Asclepias welshii =

Species of plant

Asclepias welshii is a rare species of milkweed known by the common name Welsh's milkweed. It is native to southern Utah and northern Arizona, where there are four known occurrences remaining. Most of the plants occur in Coral Pink Sand Dunes State Park, where the habitat has been degraded in many areas by off-road vehicle use. It is a federally listed threatened species of the United States.

This is an erect perennial herb growing up to a meter tall. It is "a rather handsome milkweed" which "is a very distinctive species with no obvious close relatives," according to Holmgren and Holmgren, who described the plant in 1979. It grows from a sturdy rhizome system that anchors it in the unstable sands of its native dune habitat, with several aboveground stems arising from one rhizome system. For this reason, it is not possible to get an accurate count of how many individual plants actually exist, since several widely spaced stems may actually belong to one plant; estimates of the number of plants remaining are based on stem counts. The rhizomes can penetrate very deeply into the dunes, possibly even to the bedrock at the base, and all the plants in one colony may actually be one individual with clones. There are perhaps 20,000 stems, according to count data, for an unknown number of genetically separate individuals. The plant colonizes empty dunes and is eventually outcompeted when other plant species move into the area. A pioneer species of blowouts, it often grows alongside blowout grass (Redfieldia flexuosa), a resident of this habitat type.

The upright stem has several oppositely arranged pairs of leaves up to 9 centimeters long by 6 wide. The stem and leaves are covered in a dense coat of woolly hairs, especially the new leaves. The hairs may prevent the plant from losing water in its dry habitat, or protect the plant tissues from the scouring action of windblown sand. The inflorescence is a dense ball of many flowers, the whole head measuring around 7 centimeters wide. Each flower is just under a centimeter long and white in color with a pale pink center. The fruit is a warty follicle containing large hair-tufted seeds that measure at least 2 centimeters in length. Many plants do not produce many mature fruits and undergo vegetative reproduction, spreading via the rhizome. The plant may be difficult to identify if not in its mature form; the two immature forms look very different. The smallest form which emerges through the sand from the rhizome has narrow linear leaves very unlike those the mature plant, and the secondary form has leaves intermediate to the two.

The largest population of the plant at Coral Pink Dunes State Park, particularly the half managed by the Bureau of Land Management, has been impacted by off-road vehicle use, but such activity in the area has not increased since the plant was listed for protection. Park staff keeps track of off-road vehicle activity on the grounds. ORVs are not allowed in the Paria Canyon-Vermilion Cliffs Wilderness, where there is a widespread occurrence. The plant also occurs south of the Utah border in Arizona. This population is on Navajo Nation territory, which is remote, unmonitored, and not thought to be impacted by human activity.
