= Maynard Dixon =

American artist (1875–1946)

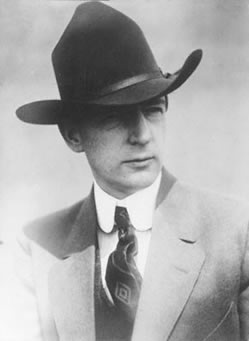
- Dixon c. 1906
- Born: Lafayette Maynard Dixon; January 24, 1875; Fresno, California, U.S.
- Died: November 11, 1946 (aged 71); Tucson, Arizona, U.S.
- Known for: Painter
- Movement: Tonalist, Impressionism, Precisionism
- Spouse(s): Lillian West Toby (1905–1917); Dorothea Lange (1920–1935); Edith Hamlin (1937–1946)
- Father: Harry St. John Dixon
- Relatives: Harry Dixon (brother)

Lafayette Maynard Dixon (January 24, 1875 – November 11, 1946) was an American artist. He was known for his paintings, and his body of work focused on the American West. Dixon is considered one of the finest artists having dedicated most of their art to the U.S. Southwestern cultures and landscapes at the end of the 19th century and the first half of the 20th century. He was often called "The Last Cowboy in San Francisco."

Through his work with the Galerie Beaux Arts, a cooperative gallery in San Francisco, Dixon played a pivotal role ensuring the West Coast supported the work of local, modern artists. He was married for a time to photographer Dorothea Lange, and later to painter Edith Hamlin.

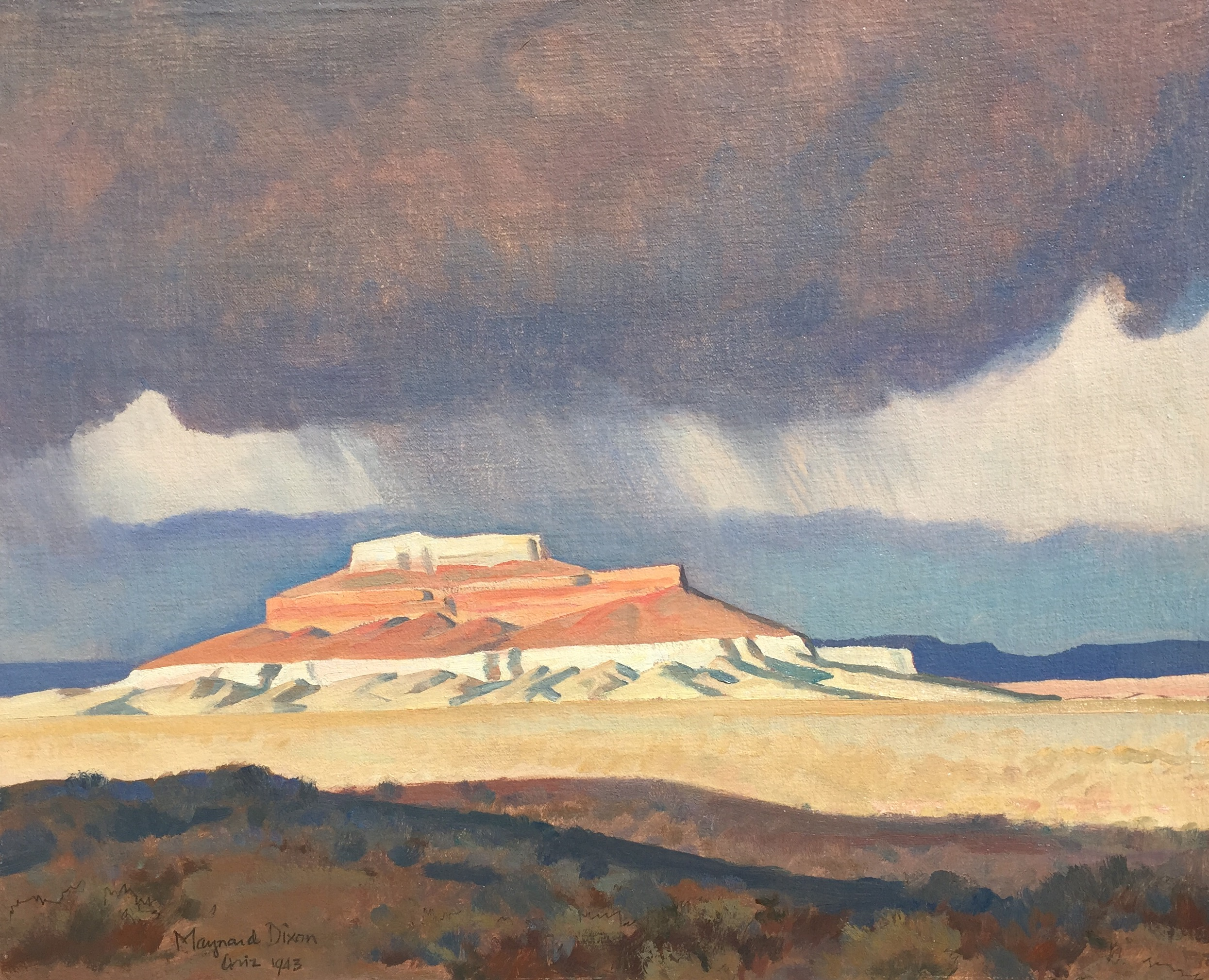
Thunder Over Ship Rock, Steven Stern Fine Arts

== Early life and education ==
He was born Lafayette Maynard Dixon on January 24, 1875, in Fresno, California, he was named after his maternal grandfather. His father was Harry St. John Dixon, a former Mississippi Confederate States Army officer turned lawyer and rancher. His mother, Constance Maynard, a well-educated daughter of a U.S. Navy officer from San Francisco, shared her love of classic literature with the young boy and encouraged him in his writing and drawing. His youngest brother Harry Dixon was a noted metalsmith.

Dixon moved to San Francisco in 1893 and studied with Arthur Mathews at the California School of Design (now San Francisco Art Institute). There, he became a friend of Tonalist painter Xavier Martinez, with whom he traveled to Monterey, Carmel, and Point Lobos.

== Career ==
In 1900 Dixon visited Arizona and Mexico, later accompanied artist Edward Borein on a horseback trip through several western states. Also he arranged for the debut exhibition of the soon-to-be-famous sculptor Arthur Putnam in the “jinks room” of the San Francisco Press Club. Dixon's sketching trip through Arizona and Guadalajara in March and April 1905 with Martinez garnered much attention in the press. Dixon moved into Martinez's Montgomery Street atelier; their joint studio exhibitions were usually held on Saturdays. To insure a steady income, he worked as an illustrator for local newspapers and magazines (including the Overland Monthly and Sunset magazine), and illustrated numerous books, such as Clarence E. Mulford’s Hopalong Cassidy.

For his first exhibition in the southwest, Dixon contributed four oils to the show of Modern Art From The American West curated by the well-known impressionist Jennie V. Cannon at the University of Arizona in Tucson in December of 1912.

In 1917, to support America’s entry into World War I, Dixon joined Lee Fritz Randolph, Bruce Nelson, and other artists on a committee to redesign U.S. Army camouflage.

During his tenure in northern California, he was a prolific contributor to art exhibitions. His first publicized exhibition was a show of “regional artists” in Alameda, California during the spring of 1899. Thereafter he exhibited at major venues: California Society of Artists (1902); Bohemian Club (1903–1928); San Francisco Art Association (1903–1931); Newspaper Artists League (1903); Press Club (1904); Hotel Del Monte Art Gallery (1907–1909); Panama–Pacific International Exposition (1915); Gump's Gallery (1920 – solo exhibition); San Francisco Print Rooms (1920 – this show was later sent to Honolulu); San Francisco's Don Lee Galleries (1923); Oakland Art Gallery (1926–1928); University of California, Berkeley (1928); California State Fair (1928); and Golden Gate International Exposition (1939).

Between 1925 and 1933, art dealer Beatrice Judd Ryan ran the Galerie Beaux Arts in San Francisco, with guidance from Dixon. The Galerie Beaux Arts was the first contemporary gallery in the city, as well as a cooperative nonprofit, which supported local modern artists.

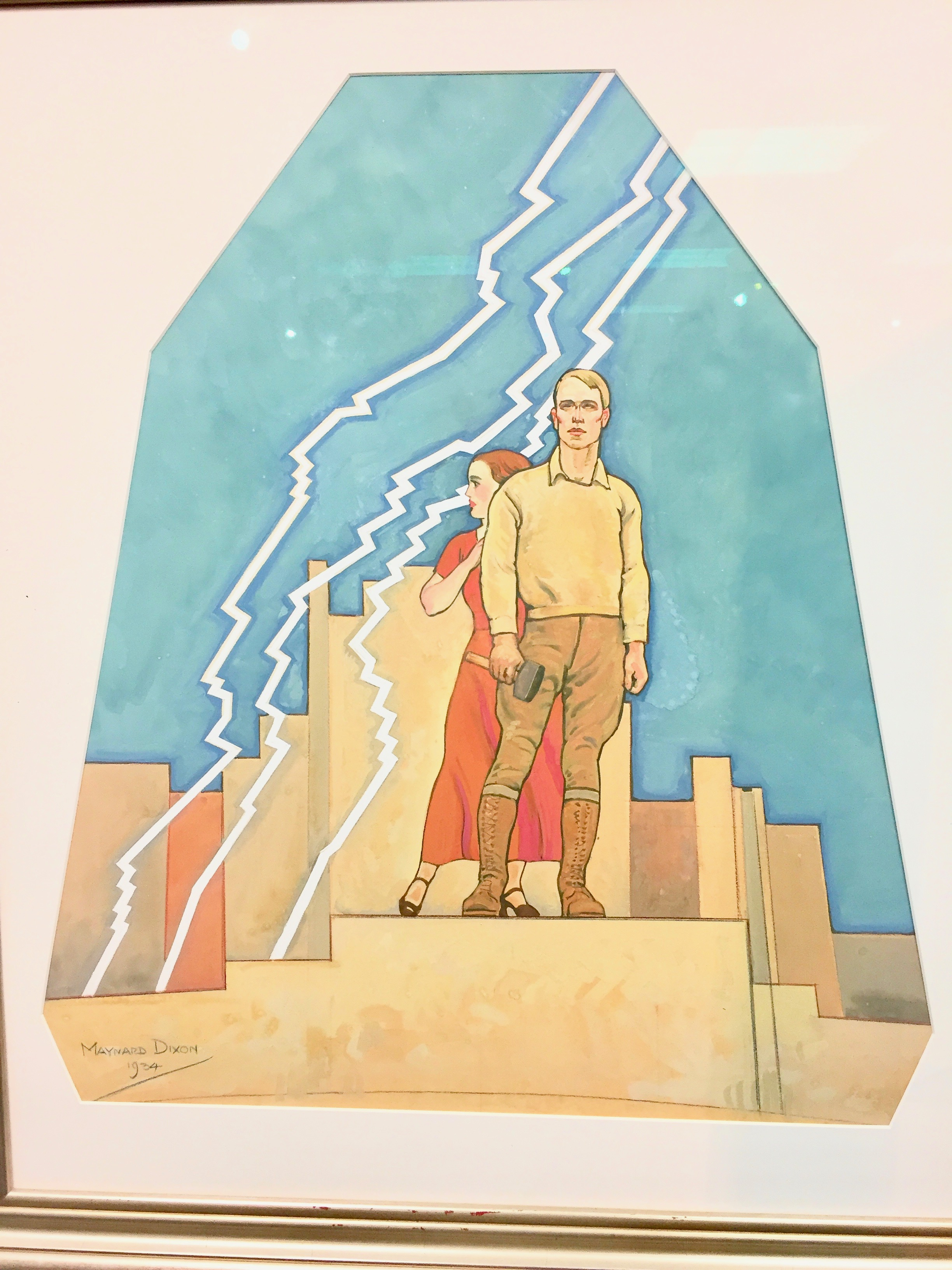
Modern Man and Woman, 1934, by Dixon

In 1926, Dixon was co-curator with Laura Adams Armer for an exhibit of “Pueblo and Navajo Arts & Crafts” at the Paul Elder Gallery of San Francisco under the auspices of the Indian Defense Association of Central and Northern California. In 1927 he joined several prominent artists in a boycott of the Bohemian Club Annual Exhibition when works of the more “modern” artists were excluded. During February 1930 he was one of a handful of artists, which included Ralph Stackpole, Otis Oldfield, Helen Katharine Forbes, and several others, who contributed to a Galerie Beaux Arts show where the subject of every painting was the same female model. During the summer of 1931 he exhibited with the most prominent artists of the west, including William Ritschel, Armin Hansen, Granville Redmond, and Leland Curtis, at the Tahoe Tavern on Lake Tahoe. Between 1935 and 1943 he was a member of the Society of the Thirteen Watercolorists that exhibited at the San Francisco Museum of Art, California Palace of the Legion of Honor, Stanford University Art Gallery, and de Young Museum.

For a time, he lived in New York with his young wife and baby daughter Constance, but soon returned to the western United States where he said he could create "honest art of the west" instead of the romanticized versions he was being paid to create. Shortly after he began a new life in San Francisco, his first marriage ended.

Dixon developed his style during this period, and western themes became a trademark for him. In San Francisco, Dixon was considered a colorful character with a good sense of humor. He often dressed like a cowboy and seemed determined to impart a western style, most often in the form of a black Stetson hat, boots, and a bolo tie.

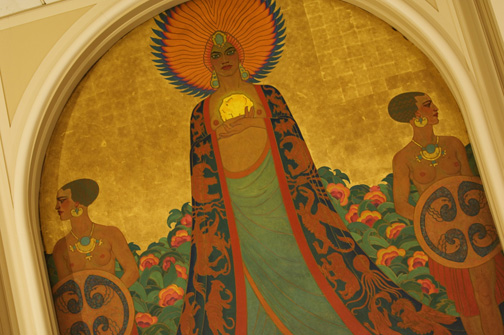
Dixon contributed to the murals that adorn a banquet hall at the Mark Hopkins Hotel, including that of Queen Califia, shown accompanied by two of her woman warriors.

Influenced in part by the Panama Pacific International Exposition of 1915, Dixon began to search for a new expression, moving away from impressionism and into a simpler, more modern style. Meeting and marrying Dorothea Lange, a portrait photographer from the east, had a great influence on his art. They married in 1920 and by 1925, the year their first son Daniel Rhodes Dixon was born (15 May), Maynard's style had changed dramatically to even more powerful compositions, with the emphasis on design, color, and self-expression - further solidifying his modernistic style. The power of low horizons and marching cloud formations, simplified, and distilled, became his own brand and at once were both bold and mysterious. On 12 June 1928, their second son was born, John Eaglefeather Dixon.

During the Great Depression, Dixon painted a series of social realism canvases depicting the prevailing politics of maritime strikes, displaced workers, and those affected by the depression. Simultaneously, Lange captured on film images of the migrant workers in the Salinas Valley and the city breadlines, images that eventually brought her fame. In 1933 the Dixons spent the summer in Zion National Park with sojourns to the hamlet of Mount Carmel, Utah. Lange was called back to San Francisco, a separation that led to the couple's divorce in 1935.

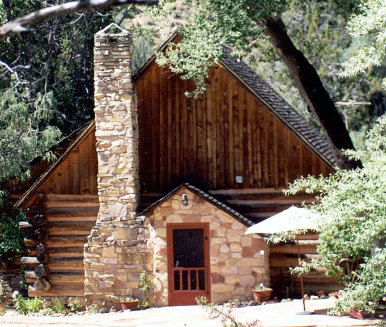
Maynard Dixon Home

Two years later, Dixon married San Francisco muralist Edith Hamlin. The couple left San Francisco two years later for southern Utah, the source of some of Dixon's greatest art. In 1939, the couple built a summer home in Mount Carmel, where Dixon found new friends and became reacquainted with the local natural landscapes. He lived near the cottonwood trees along an old irrigation ditch and took short hikes to a plateau where he loved the quiet. Dixon spent winter months in Tucson, where the couple also had a home and studio.

Dixon continued to create simple but powerful compositions in which non-essential elements were distilled or eliminated. His last public work was the "Palomino Ponies" mural at the Canoga Park Post Office. In 1946, Maynard died at his home in Tucson. In the spring of 1947, his widow Edith brought his ashes to Mount Carmel where she buried them on a high bluff above the art studio being built on the property. This had been at his request and she felt it a fitting tribute where friends could come to pay respects and view the land that he loved.

In addition to painting, he also wrote poetry. An article in the California Historical Quarterly described his poetry as "very competent and sometimes superb."

== Legacy ==
There are three museums devoted to Dixon and his works. The largest collection of Dixon's works is at Brigham Young University, at the Museum of Art.

The Maynard and Edith Hamlin Dixon House and Studio, operated by the Thunderbird Foundation, offers guided tours at Mount Carmel, Utah. The foundation is working to establish a separate museum and regional art center that would feature works by Maynard Dixon and his circle, Milford Zornes and his circle, as well as contemporary work by local artists.

There is a Maynard Dixon Museum in the same complex as and owned by the Mark Sublette Medicine Man Gallery in Tucson, Arizona. Works by Dixon include paintings, watercolors, pastels, drawings, poetry, and illustrations.

The full-length documentary film, Maynard Dixon: Art and Spirit (2007) was directed by Jayne McKay, and includes candid commentary from their children and extended family. The television program, Maynard Dixon: To the Desert Again (2007), was produced by KUED-TV.

There is a statue of Dixon in front of Western Spirit: Scottsdale's Museum of the West.

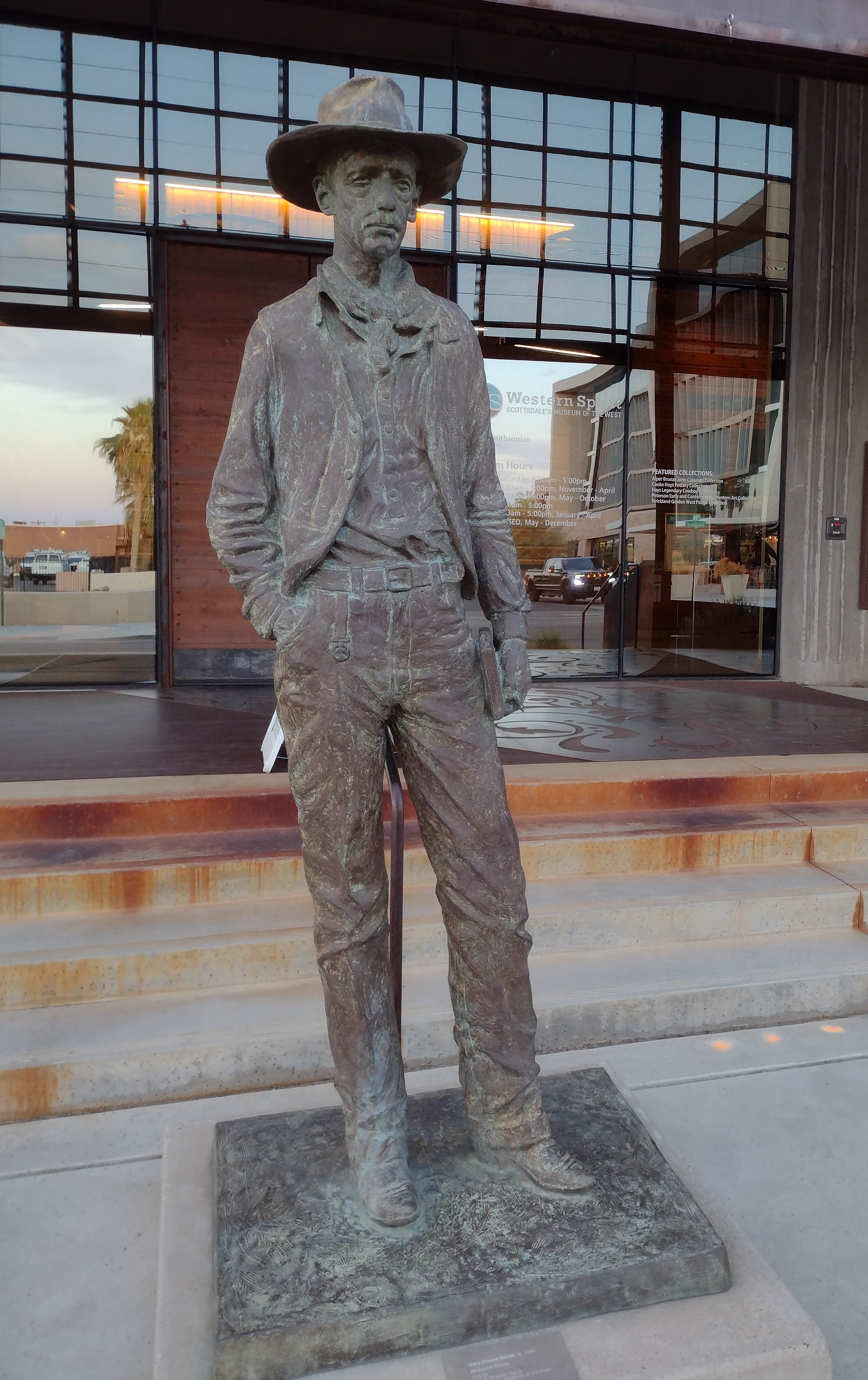
Maynard Dixon bronze statue by artist Gary Ernest Smith, in front of the Western Spirit museum in Scottsdale, Arizona

== Exhibitions ==
- "Maynard Dixon – Images of the Native American". California Academy of Sciences, San Francisco, California. June–October 1981
- "Maynard Dixon". University of California Berkeley Art Museum – MATRIX, Berkeley, California. December 15, 1981 – March 7, 1982
- "Escape to Reality": The Western World of Maynard Dixon". Brigham Young University, Provo, Utah. November 2000 – November 2001
- "Maynard Dixon". University of Arizona, Tucson, Arizona. January to April 2005
- "Maynard Dixon – Masterpieces from Brigham Young University & Private Collections". Pacific Museum of California Art, Pasadena, California, June–August 2007.
- "Widening the Horizon: New Mexico Landscapes". Matthews Gallery, Santa Fe, New Mexico. June 13–30, 2015
- "Maynard Dixon: Beyond the Clouds". Western Museum, Wickenburg, Arizona. December 2016 – March 2017
- "Maynard Dixon: The Paltenghi Collections". Nevada Museum of Art, Reno, Nevada. January to July 2017
- "Maynard Dixon’s New Mexico Centennial", El Museo Cultural – Objects of Art, Santa Fe, New Mexico. August 2018
- "Along the Distant Mesa: An Homage to Maynard Dixon", Medicine Man Gallery, Tucson, Arizona, March–April 2019
- "Maynard Dixon's American West," Western Spirit: Scottsdale Museum of the West, Oct 2019 – July 2020
- “Maynard Dixon: Searching for a Home”, Provo, Utah, Brigham Young University Museum of Art, Oct 2022 – Sept 2023

== See also ==
- Fernand Lungren
- Western American Art
