= Electro Rent =

American provider of electronic equipment

Electro Rent Corporation
- Company type: Private
- Industry: Leasing Service
- Founded: 1965
- Headquarters: Canoga Park, California, United States
- Area served: Worldwide
- Revenue: $243.08 million (As of 2013)
- Owner: Platinum Equity
- Website: www.electrorent.com

Electro Rent Corporation is a provider of rental, leasing, and sales of electronic test and measurement (T&M) equipment, and in the United States rents personal computers and servers.

On May 31, 2016, Platinum Equity announced its intent to acquire Electro Rent for $382.2 million.

== History ==
Electro Rent was founded in 1965.

In 2010, Electro Rent LLC paid approximately $26.7 million in cash to acquire privately held Telogy, a competitor that filed for bankruptcy protection earlier that year and was at that time based in Union City, California.

== Locations ==
The company is headquartered in Canoga Park, California and has facilities in the United States, Canada, India, South East Asia, the People’s Republic of China, and Europe.

== Industries served ==
Electro Rent purchases equipment from its suppliers and rents, leases, or sells the equipment to customers in aerospace, defense, telecommunications, electronics and semiconductor industries.

Besides T&M equipment rental business, Electro Rent also provides data product rental service. Its data products (“DP”) division provides personal computers and server rental services in the United States from manufacturers including Dell, HP/Compaq, IBM, Toshiba and Apple, Inc.

Electro Rent is one of the largest personal computer and server rental providers in the United States, and its data products division’s revenue made up about 7% of the company’s total revenue in consecutive fiscal year of 2011-2013.

== Suppliers ==
The company’s supplier base is composed by electronic equipment manufacturers such as Keysight and Tektronix. In 2010, it became a reseller for Agilent, the largest T&M equipment manufacturer in North America.

== Awards ==
In 2011, the company was selected as one of the eight recipients to receive the Preferred Supplier Award from L-3 Communications as an excellent partner In 2012, Frost & Sullivan awarded the company the Frost & Sullivan Award for Company of the Year for its revenue growth over the previous two years.
