= Mt. Carmel School and Church =

Historic church in Utah, United States

- U.S. National Register of Historic Places
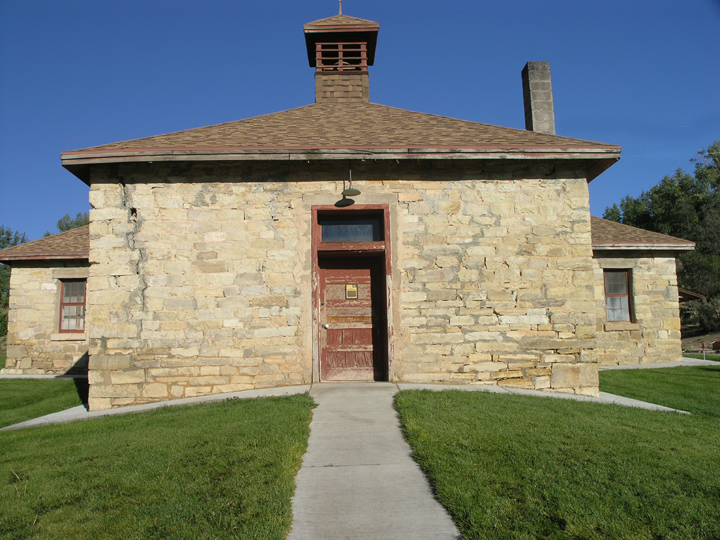
- West side of the Historic Rock Church

- Location within Utah Location within the United States
- Location: US-89 in Mount Carmel; Orderville, Utah; United States
- Coordinates: 37°14′48″N 112°39′55″W
- Area: 1.2 acres (0.49 ha)
- Built: 1890
- NRHP reference No.: 87002061
- Added to NRHP: November 20, 1987

Mt. Carmel School and Church – also known as the Historic Rock Church – is an historic church building (of the Church of Jesus Christ of Latter-day Saints) and school located along U.S. Route 89 in the Mount Carmel community in what is now part of the town of Orderville, Utah, United States. On October 20, 1987, it applied to be included on the National Register of Historic Places (NRHP).

== Description ==
The historic rock church in Mount Carmel was used to school the children living in the Mount Carmel area. The log building was built in 1880 and used as a church, school house and recreation hall. In 1890 it was converted into the stone structure.

In 1919 it burned down. In 1923 it was rebuilt, this time with rock. After the small building was rebuilt, the rock structure was used almost entirely as a church. The children who once attended school in the log building rode to nearby Orderville in a covered wagon each day to attend school. The Historic Rock Church was added to the NRHP November 20, 1987.

== See also ==
- National Register of Historic Places listings in Kane County, Utah
