= Maynard and Edith Hamlin Dixon House and Studio =

Historic house in Utah, United States

- U.S. National Register of Historic Places
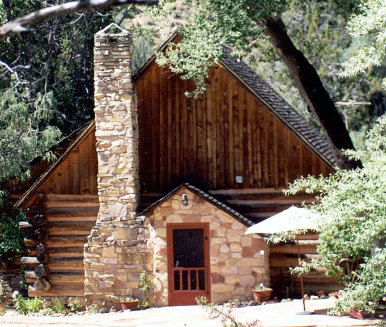

- Location within Utah Location within the United States
- Location: U.S. Route 89, Mount Carmel, Utah
- Coordinates: 37°15′13″N 112°39′37″W
- Built: 1939
- NRHP reference No.: 01001450
- Added to NRHP: January 11, 2002

The Maynard and Edith Hamlin Dixon House and Studio is a residence and former painting studio in Mount Carmel, Utah. Maynard Dixon was a prominent artist in the 1920s through 1940s who is best known for his landscape paintings of the American West. He moved to Mount Carmel in 1939 shortly after marrying Edith Hamlin, a muralist from San Francisco, California. The Dixons spent their summers in the home and wintered in Tucson, Arizona. Maynard Dixon died in 1946, and Edith brought his ashes back to his Mt. Carmel home. Shortly afterward, Edith ordered the construction of a painting studio on the lot, where she created several of her notable works. Edith Dixon sold the home in 1963 to watercolor artist Milford Zornes, who occasionally used the studio. The property is on the National Register of Historic Places and is open to the public.

== History ==
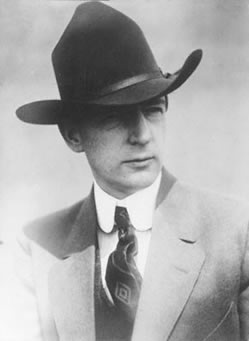
Maynard Dixon, c. 1906

Maynard Dixon was born in 1875 in Fresno, California. He trained as an artist in the early 1890s and was a successful illustrator for the rest of the decade. Dixon admired the scenery of the American West and began to make tonalist and impressionist paintings of its landscapes. In the 1920s, he shifted to a Precisionism style, influenced by his then-wife Dorothea Lange. Many of Dixon's works included Native Americans and sometimes lived in their reservations and the surrounding, undeveloped land. Dixon married Edith Hamlin, a noted muralist from San Francisco, California in 1937. Over two hundred of Dixon's works were hosted in museums and art galleries before his death in 1946.

The Dixons moved to Mt. Carmel, Utah in 1939. Maynard first visited the area in 1933 and made several paintings of the small town. Mt. Carmel also proved to be an ideal launching area for excursions to Zion National Park, a place that proved to be an inspiration for several of his most popular works. Maynard made plans to return to Mt. Carmel almost as soon as he married Edith. They purchased an adjoining lot and built a wine cellar and guesthouse. The Dixons spent summers in the Mt. Carmel home and wintered in Tucson, Arizona.

Maynard Dixon last visited the home in 1945; his failing health from emphysema forced him to stay in Tucson that summer and he died in his Tucson residence on November 11, 1946. The next year, Edith buried his ashes beneath a boulder at the Mt. Carmel home and installed a memorial plaque. Edith continued to summer in the Mt. Carmel home, adding a large paint studio in 1948. She remarried in 1951 and moved back to San Francisco in 1953. Edith sold the property to her friend, the famed watercolor artist Milford Zornes. Zornes occasionally used the property's studio for his own works. He sold the house to the Binghams, who restored the building and the property.

The house is a 1 1/2-story log home with a stone foundation. The roof features steep gables and a tall chimney. Windows are double-hung, and the upper floor features a balcony. The upper floor can be accessed by an exterior staircase in the rear of the house. The garage, also steeply gabled, was the original living quarters for the Dixons while the main house was being constructed. Edith's studio is a vernacular one-story building with two rooms. The guesthouse was originally a log home with a flagstone extension added in the late 1940s or early 1950s. The wine and fruit cellar is in a hillside west of the residence and features built-in shelves. An outhouse was built in 1939, south of the main house; the house now has indoor plumbing. A trail from the studio leads to Maynard Dixon's memorial, which remains on a hill. East of the studio lies a boulder, featuring Maynard's initials, that was one of his favorite spots. The grounds, which were added to the National Register of Historic Places in 2002, are open to self-guided or guide-led tours for a donation.
