= Milford Zornes =

American artist

- Born: January 25, 1908; Oklahoma, U.S.
- Died: February 24, 2008 (aged 100); Claremont, California, U.S.

Academic background
- Education: Otis College of Art and Design; Heald College; Pomona College

Academic work
- Discipline: Art
- Institutions: Pomona College

James Milford Zornes (January 25, 1908 – February 24, 2008) was an American watercolor artist and teacher known as part of the California Scene Painting movement.

== Biography ==
Milford Zornes was born in rural western Oklahoma, a few miles from the small town of Camargo. His father found farming and stock raising in the area difficult, and when young Milford was seven, he moved the family to Boise, Idaho. Though his mother, a former schoolteacher, taught him to draw as a child, it was not until his late teens, when the family moved to California, that Zornes received any formal training in art when he attended his last year of secondary school at San Fernando High School.

After graduating from high school he decided to attempt a career in journalism, and began by selling photographs to various magazines, including Popular Science, Scientific American, and Popular Mechanics, and then received a few assignments to write articles. Advised that a journalist needed formal study, he moved to Santa Maria, California where he enrolled in what was then called Santa Maria Junior College. He then thought he might like to be an architect, and he moved to San Francisco to study engineering at Heald College. But he had difficulty with the math classes and had an urge to travel. He hitchhiked across the United States, and looked for work on ships out of various ports, finally getting a job as a seaman on a ship from New York to Copenhagen. He saw parts of Europe, including the Louvre and other art museums, but soon ran out of money and was helped back to the U.S. by an American Sailor's Relief Society. Another seaman position got him back to California, now determined to be an artist.

He studied for a few months at the Otis Art Institute (now Otis College of Art and Design) under E. Roscoe Schrader. After a period of working in Arizona, he attended Glendale Junior College and then Pomona College, where he took classes from Millard Sheets at nearby Scripps College.

Zornes married Gloria Codd in 1935 and had one son, Franz. In 1942 he married Patricia Mary Palmer, and had one daughter, Maria Patricia. He died from congestive heart failure on February 24, 2008, in his Claremont, California home. He was 100.

== Art career ==
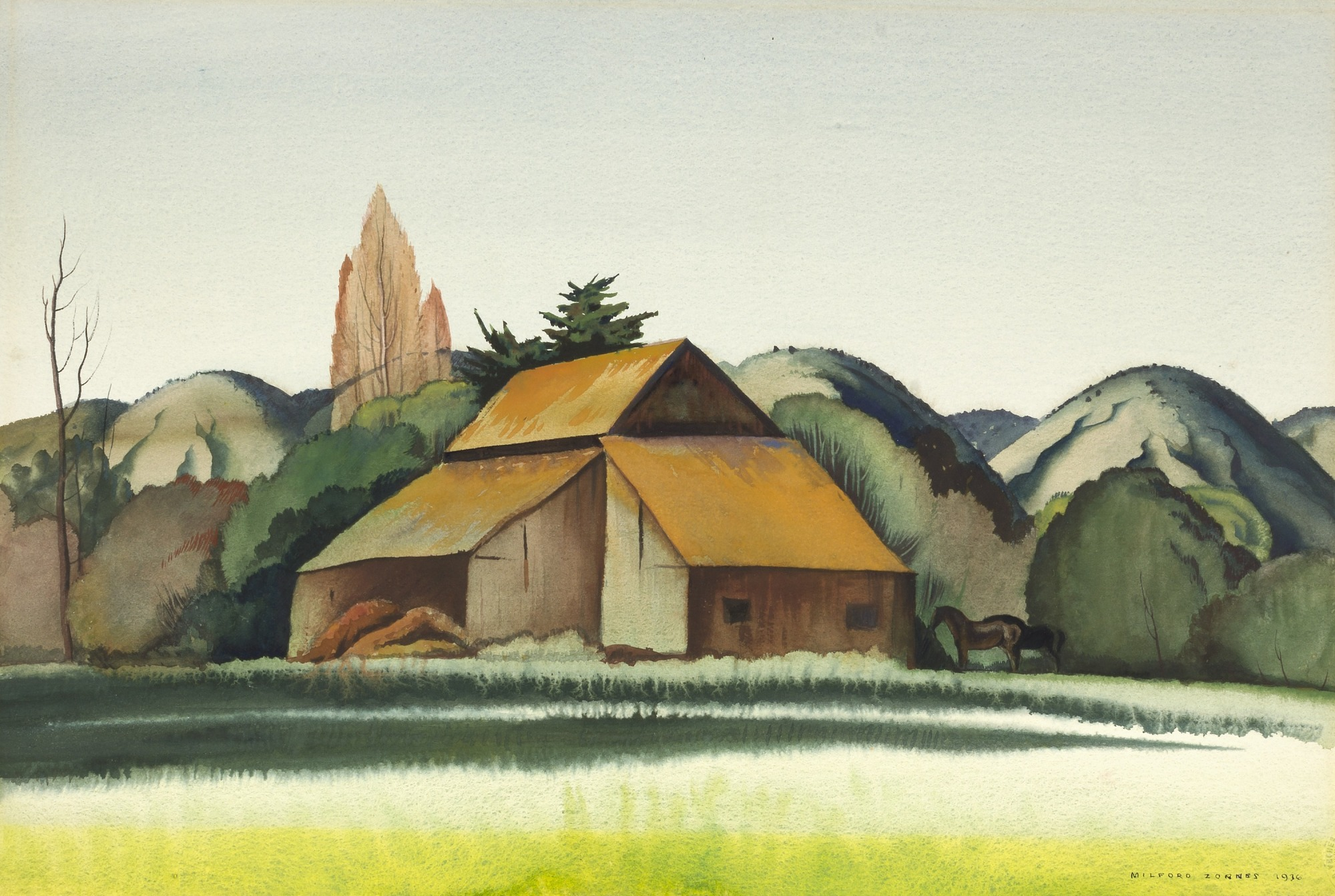
Old Barn in Nipomo, California (1936)

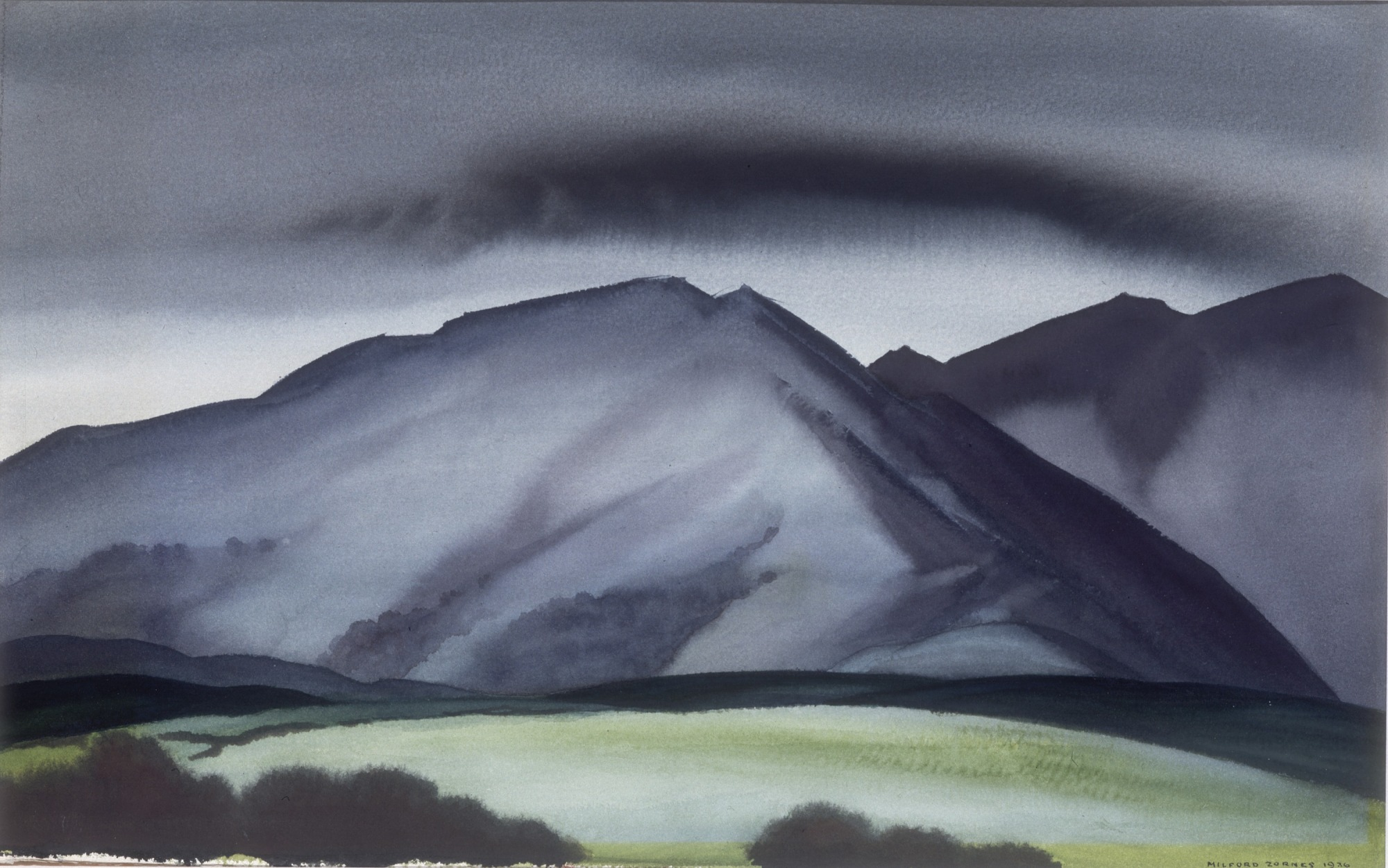
San Fernando Mountains (1936)

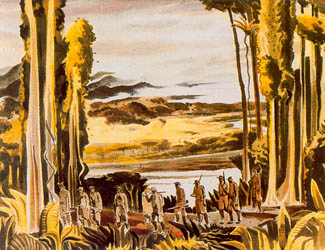
On the Edge of the Jungle (1942), an example of Zornes' work for the United States Army Art Program during the Burma campaign

Through his association with Millard Sheets and other Southern California watercolorists, Zornes became active in the "California Style" movement. During the Great Depression he and his colleagues began painting primarily in watercolor because of the medium's versatility and inexpensive cost. Using watercolor and paper instead of oils and canvas made it easy for the impoverished artists to transport their materials easily and paint on site. The immediate drying qualities of the paint allowed for few mistakes, but artists like Zornes mastered the medium. Nevertheless, he used oil-on-canvas for his early New Deal mural commissions for post offices, such as the 1937 29-foot mural in Claremont, California. He also made fine art prints on occasion. He was given a solo show at the Corcoran Gallery of Art in Washington, D.C., in 1933.

An active member of the California Water Color Society, he served as its president in 1941–42, when its annual exhibition was shown in San Francisco as well as Los Angeles.

During World War II he was drafted into the U.S. Army and was assigned to be an official war artist. In this capacity he traveled and painted in China, India and Burma.

After the war, he settled in Claremont, where he began teaching art at Pomona College and became a major proponent of watercolor painting in the California Style. Zornes developed a unique variation on the style, utilizing large, expansive brushstrokes and sections of unpainted white paper.

For many years, Zornes taught watercolor painting workshops in China, Alaska, Mexico, Ireland, Italy, Spain, Hawaii and many other locations. A longtime friend of Edith Hamlin, he purchased her summer home in 1963 as a base for workshops in Utah. His subject matter is often drawn from his extensive world travels, although Western landscapes are a favorite topic.

Zornes' paintings are represented in the collections of the Metropolitan Museum of Art, Corcoran Gallery of Art, Los Angeles County Museum of Art, the White House, and the Library of Congress Collection.

== Awards ==
- 1938 – William H. Tuthill Purchase Prize, Art Institute of Chicago
- 1987 – Paul Prescott Barrow award, Pomona College
- 1988 – "A Most Distinguished Citizen" award, Southern Utah State College
- 1991 – David Prescott Burrows award
- 1994 – American Artist Achievement award, American Artist Magazine
- 1994 – named National Academician by the National Academy of Design (Associate 1964)
