= Coral Pink Sand Dunes State Park =

State park in Utah, US

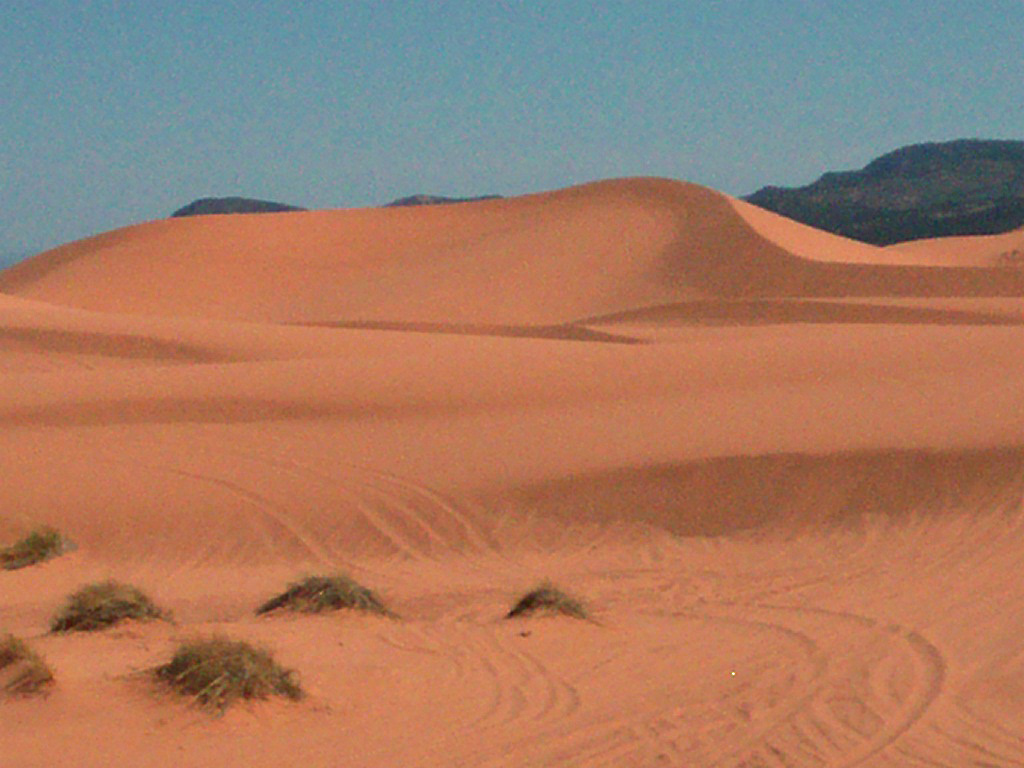
- The sand that makes up the pink-colored dunes is derived from the Navajo Sandstone

- Location within Utah Location within the United States
- Interactive map of Coral Pink Sand Dunes State Park
- Location: Kane County, Utah, United States
- Coordinates: 37°2′16″N 112°43′13″W
- Area: 3,730 acres (1,510 ha)
- Elevation: 6,000 ft (1,800 m)
- Opened: 1963
- Operator: Utah State Parks
- Visitors: 309,527 (in 2025)
- Website: Official website
- Utah State Parks

Coral Pink Sand Dunes State Park is a state park in southwestern Utah, United States, located between Mount Carmel Junction and Kanab, south and west of U.S. Highway 89 in Kane County. The park features uniquely pink-hued sand dunes located beside red sandstone cliffs.

The dunes are formed from the erosion of pink-colored Navajo Sandstone surrounding the park. High winds passing through the notch between the Moquith and Moccasin Mountains pick up loose sand particles and then drop them onto the dunes as a result of the Venturi effect. The dunes are estimated to be between 10,000 and 15,000 years old.

The park allows camping, hiking, off-road vehicle driving, and photography. There is a conservation area of 265 acres (1.07 km^{2}), and the total grounds include 3,370 acres (13.6 km^{2}). It was established as a Utah state park in 1963.

Sandboarding is also a popular activity, sandboards and sand sleds can be rented directly at the park.

The Coral Pink Sand Dunes tiger beetle (Cicindela albissima) is endemic to the dunes, being found nowhere else in the world. The park also contains most of the remaining individuals of the rare plant known as Welsh's milkweed (Asclepias welshii), a federally listed threatened species.

== Gallery ==
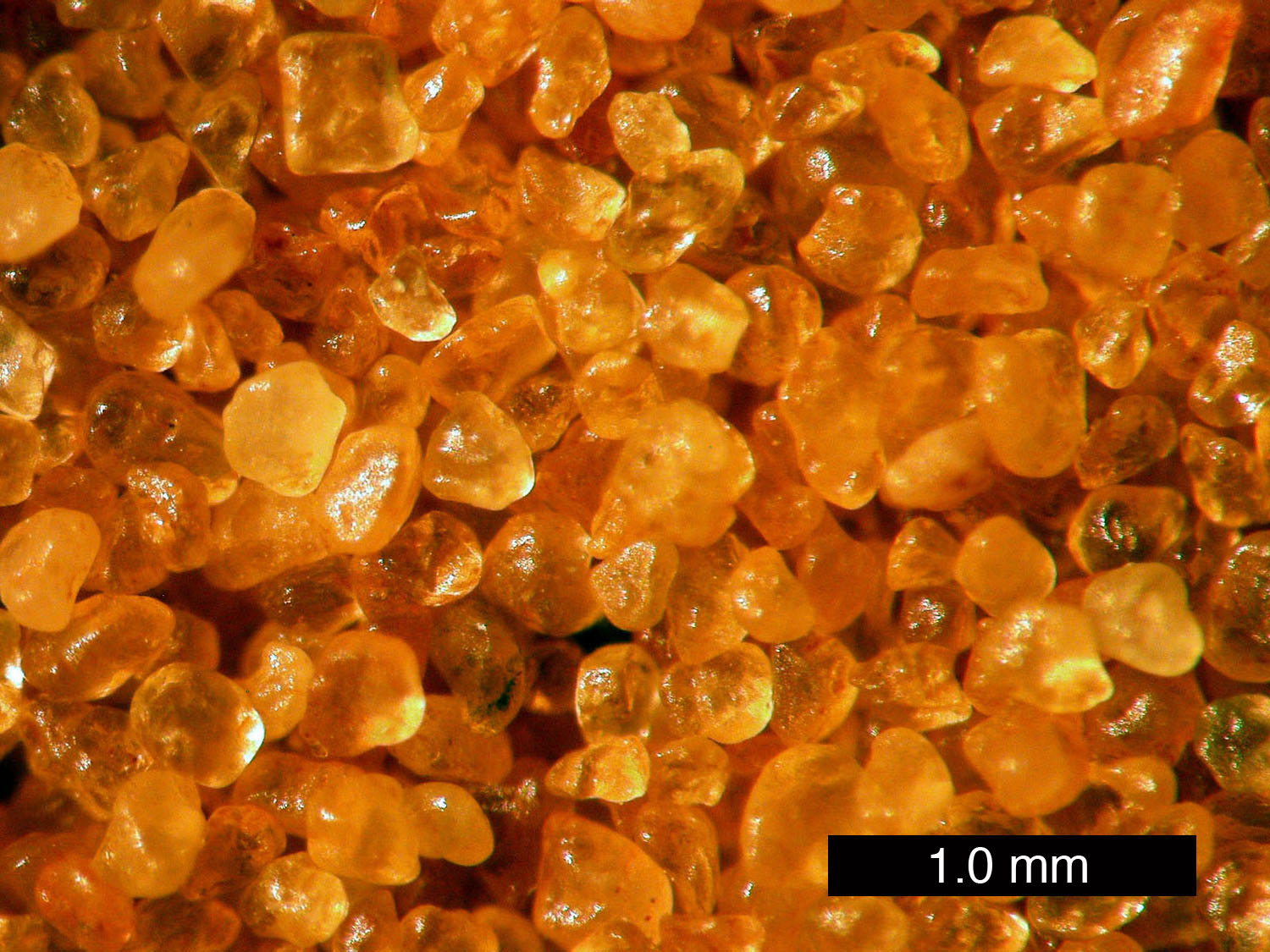
Sand from the dunes: grains of quartz with a hematite coating providing the orange color.

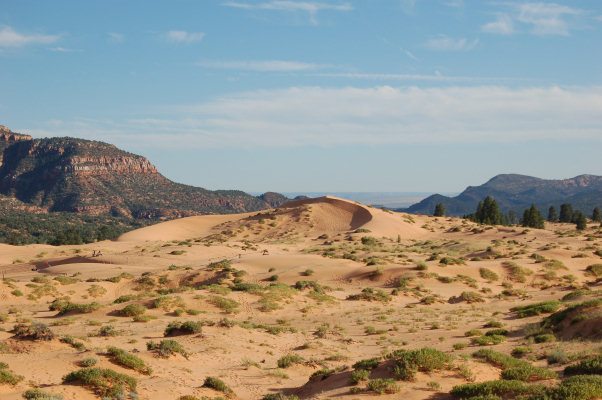
Part of the field of sand dunes.

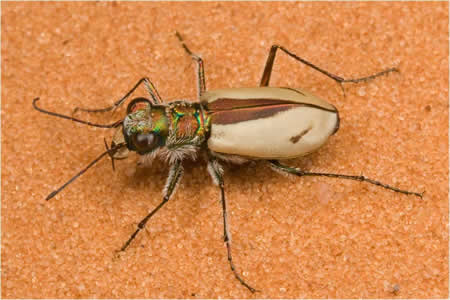
Coral Pink Sand Dunes tiger beetle (Cicindela albissima)
