= Mount Carmel Junction, Utah =

Mount Carmel Junction
- Unincorporated community
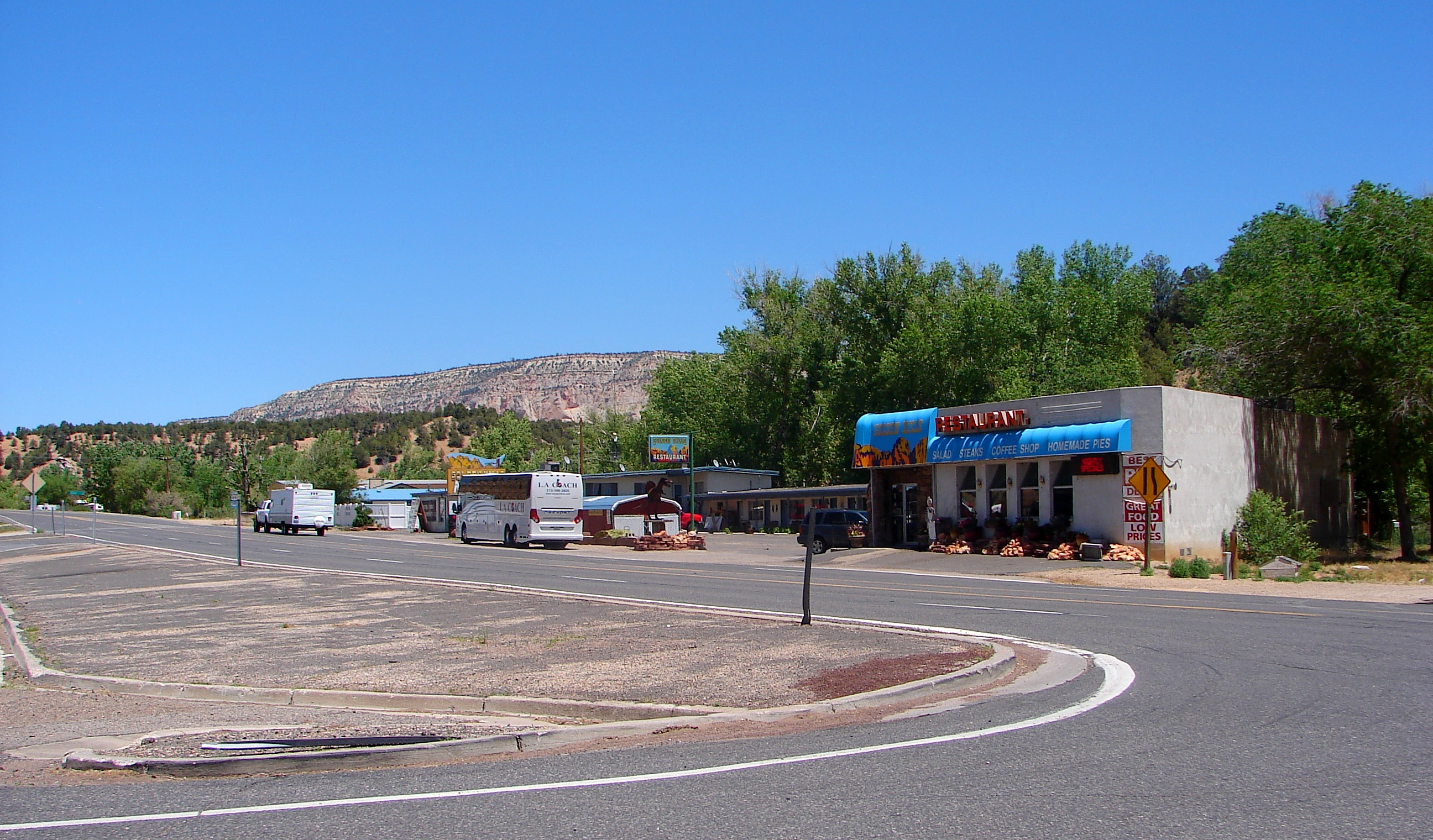

- Location within the state of Utah
- Coordinates: 37°13′27″N 112°40′50″W
- Country: United States
- State: Utah
- County: Kane
- Settled: 1871
- Elevation: 5,203 ft (1,586 m)
- Time zone: UTC-7 (Mountain (MST))
  - Summer (DST): UTC-6 (MDT)
- ZIP codes: 84755
- Area code: 435
- GNIS feature ID: 1437646

Mount Carmel Junction and Mount Carmel are unincorporated communities located 12 miles (19 km) east of Zion National Park and 17 miles (27 km) north of Kanab in Kane County, Utah, United States. They lie in close proximity to the Coral Pink Sand Dunes State Park.

Mount Carmel Junction sits at the junction of U.S. Route 89 and State Route 9 in southwestern Utah. Mount Carmel is one mile (1.6 km) north of the junction. Mount Carmel Junction is set in the high desert of the Colorado Plateau.

== History ==
The Virgin Anasazi were the prehistoric settlers in the area. Among other areas, nearby Parunuweap (East Fork of the Virgin River) contains evidence to their presence. This group occupied the area until about the 13th century. The people were agriculturalists who maintained a diet of mostly maize.

=== Settlement ===
Historical population
Census	Pop.	Note	%±
1880	137		—
1890	139		1.5%
1900	137		−1.4%
1910	131		−4.4%
1920	143		9.2%
1930	133		−7.0%
1940	187		40.6%
1950	158		−15.5%
Source: U.S. Census Bureau

Doctor Priddy Meeks settled the town of Winsor in 1864, at the site of present-day Mount Carmel Junction, as part of Brigham Young's plan to settle all of Utah Territory. In 1865 more settlers were sent by the church. Nearby Orderville and Glendale (called Berryville at this time) were also being settled. Before long, Indians forced them to leave the area. It was not until 7 years later in 1871 that the settlers returned and this time settled down permanently. This time the town was settled in the name of Mount Carmel to honor the mountain in Palestine. In 1875 Elder Howard O. Spencer presided over Mount Carmel and Glendale. He reported that most homes were temporary, but permanent structures were underway. Doctor Meeks moved to Orderville in 1876 where he died at the age of 91. He left behind two wives and several children.

Only two families ever settled in Mount Carmel Junction, and one was Jack and Fern Morrison. Jack contemplated the idea that a road must be built connecting Zion Canyon to the east side of the park. Jack explored the area and came to the conclusion that the road must come down in the area now known as Mount Carmel Junction. There were old wagon trails that Jack used to navigate his way down to the valley. The hills were steep forcing Jack to attach a Cedar tree to the back of his Model-T-Ford. Jack was patient and in 1931 he was able to homestead the land now known as Mount Carmel Junction. The land was unkind. It was covered with gullies, quicksand and many layers of sand. The area was also prone to violent flash floods. Jack and Fern lost two children in the flash floods of the East Fork of the Virgin River that runs through the junction. The East Fork of the Virgin River is now known as Parunuweap. Jack died in 1961, from cancer after serving in the war and spending much of his life working in the coal mines. Fern, a strong willed and hard working woman continued to build. She lived to the age of 90, dying in 1998.

Artist Maynard Dixon, famed for his paintings of the American West, built a summer home in Mount Carmel Junction in 1939. After his death in Tucson, Arizona, in 1946, his ashes were buried on a high bluff above the Mount Carmel art studio being built on the property.

=== John Wesley Powell - Parunuweap ===
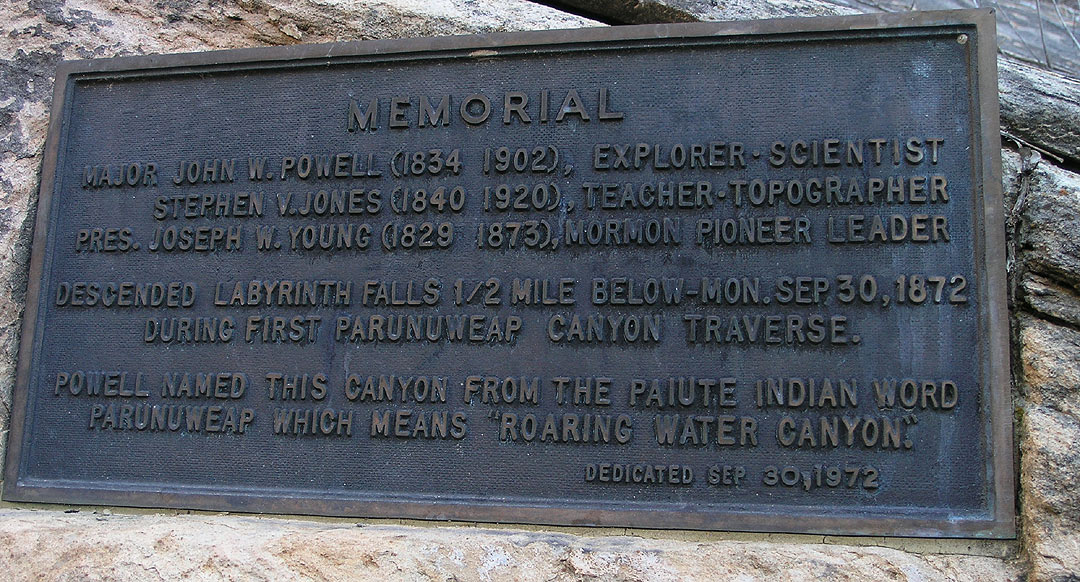
Powell Plaque

John Wesley Powell visited the area as part of the Powell Survey of 1872. He was the first European-American to descend the East Fork of the Virgin River from the current location of Mount Carmel Junction to Shunesburg. A plaque can be found at the edge of the river, just east of the Zion National Park boundary in the East Fork, that reads:

"Major John Wesley Powell 1834-1902 explorer, scientist, Steven V. Jones 1840-1920 teacher, topographer, Joseph W. Young 1829-1873 Mormon pioneer leader, Descended Labyrinth Falls 1/2 mile below Monday, September 30, 1872 during first Parunuweap Canyon traverse. Powell named this canyon from the Paiute Indian word 'Parunuweap' which means roaring water canyon. Dedicated September 30, 1972."

=== Historic Rock Church ===
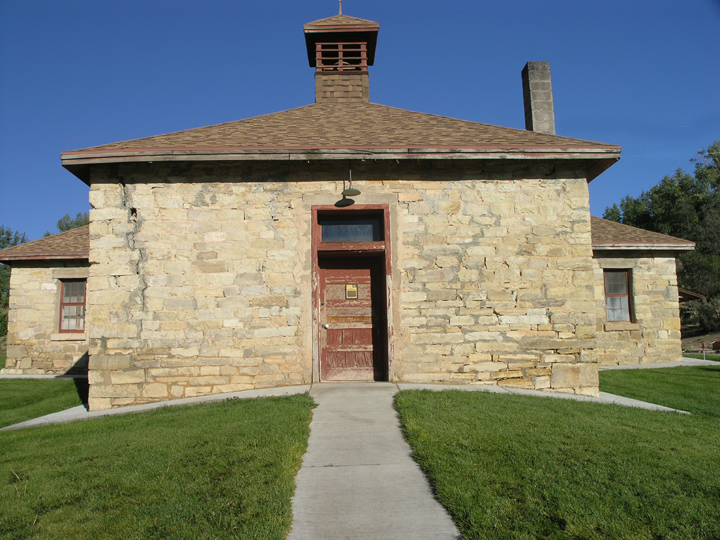
Historic Mt. Carmel School and Church

The Historic Rock Church in Mount Carmel was used to school the children living in the Mount Carmel area. The log building was built in 1880 and used as a church, school house and recreation hall. In 1890 it was converted into the stone structure. "The rock for the building was hauled by team and wagon from a hill about a mile south of town. Later a lumber wing was added, making it into a two-room school. At first the floors were of rough pine lumber. Then hardwood floors were installed, which made them 'nicer for dancing.'" In 1919 it burned down. In 1923 it was rebuilt, this time with rock. After the small building was rebuilt, the rock structure was used almost entirely as a church. The children who once attended school in the log building rode to nearby Orderville in a covered wagon each day to attend school. The Historic Rock Church is on the National Register of Historic Places.

=== Zion-Mount Carmel Highway History ===
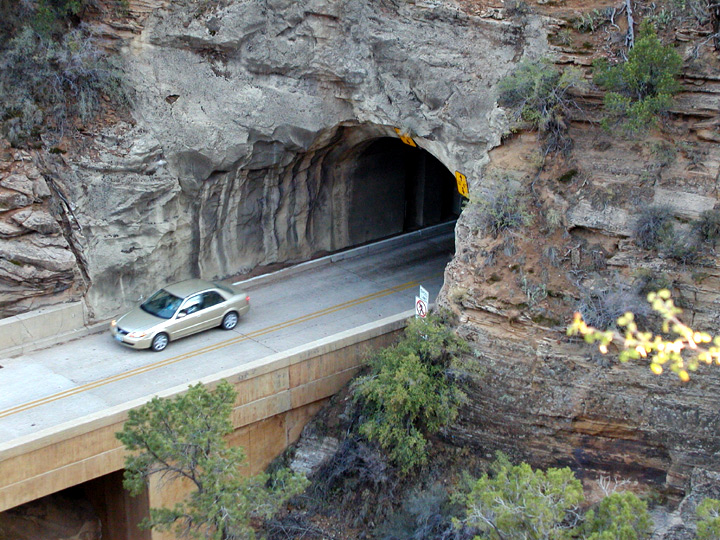
Zion-Mt.Carmel Tunnel

In 1919, a Congressional bill designating Zion National Park was signed into law. In 1923 the task of finding a way to open Zion Canyon to the east side of the park began. Four different routes were considered including two options through Parunuweap and another through North Creek. The route chosen went up the side of Pine Creek canyon on switchbacks, through a tunnel and then along Clear Creek to the east boundary of the park, and hence to US-89 at Mount Carmel Junction. Construction work on the Zion-Mount Carmel Tunnel and the Zion-Mount Carmel Highway began in 1927. The tunnel especially was considered quite an engineering feat for the time, requiring boring 5,613 feet (1,711 m) through solid rock. July 4, 1930, the tunnel and highway were dedicated, linking Zion Canyon to the land east of the park and making it easier to visit Grand Canyon and Bryce Canyon National Parks.

== Geology ==
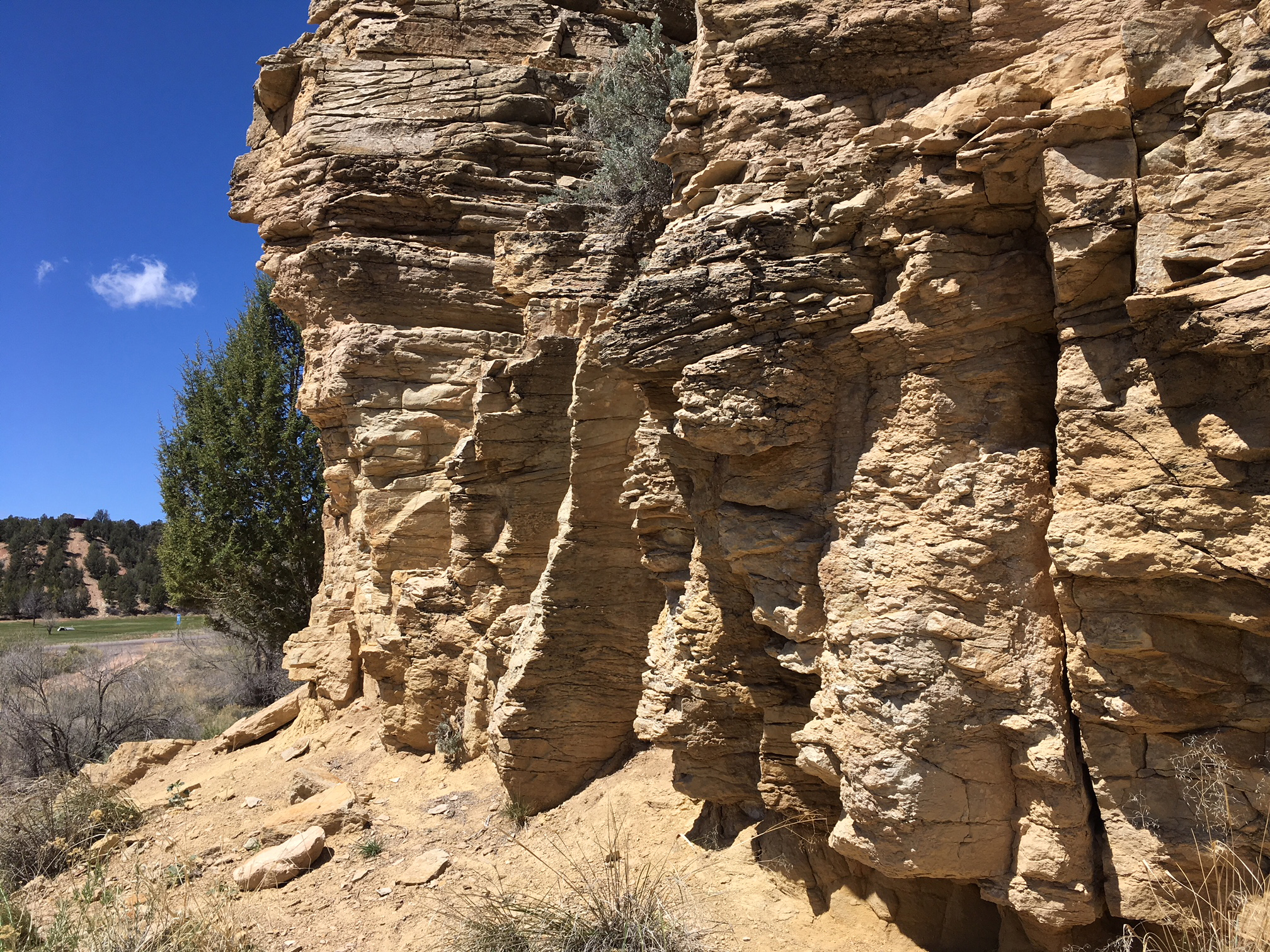
Encrinite within the Carmel Formation (Middle Jurassic) exposed at Mt. Carmel Junction, Utah.

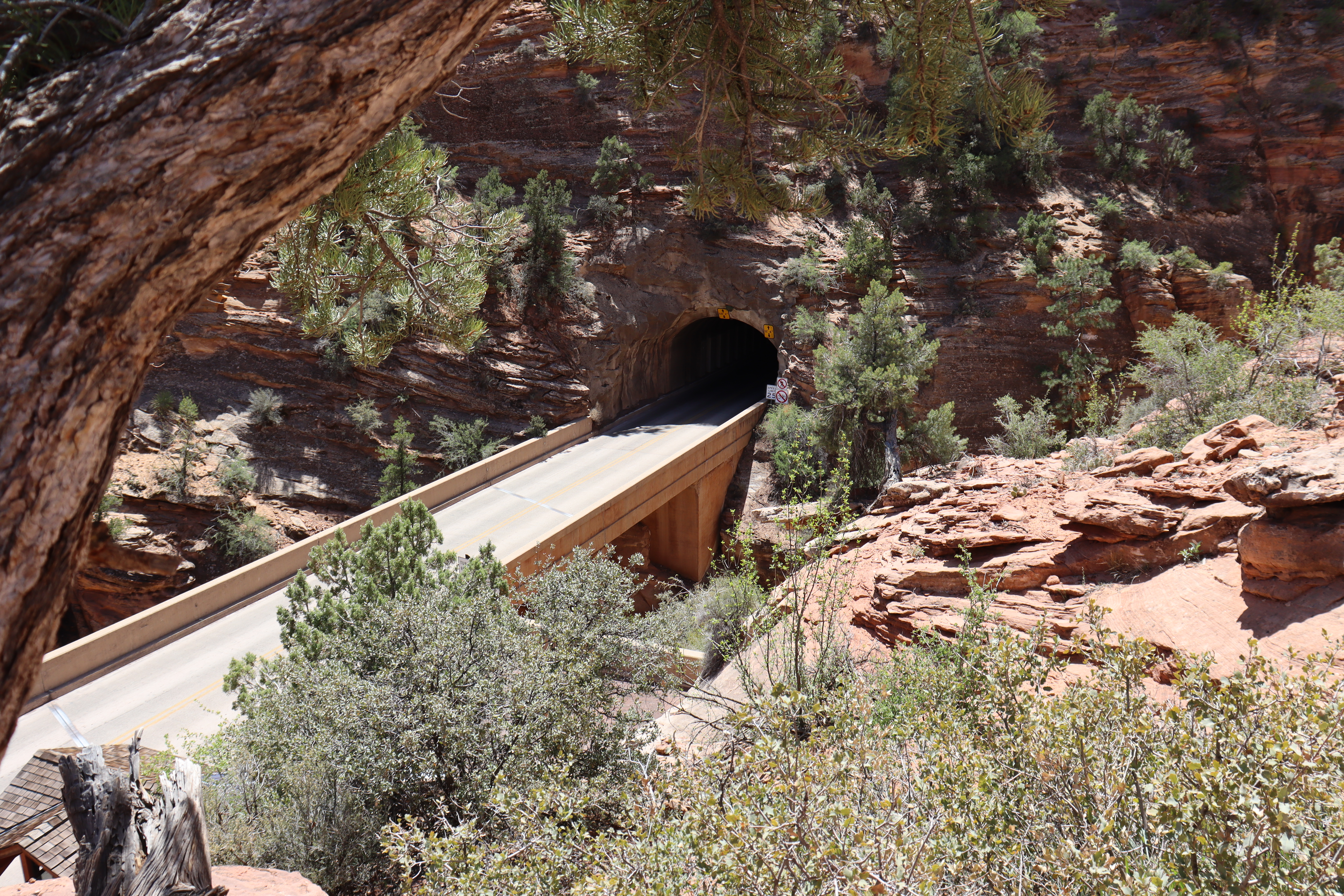
Another angle of the tunnel entrance

The north–south trending Sevier Fault is 2 miles (3.2 km) east of the main highway through Mount Carmel Junction. Sandstone cliffs lie to the south and the White Cliffs of the Grand Staircase can be seen to the east. About halfway between Mount Carmel Junction and Kanab are the Coral Pink Sand Dunes. North on U.S. Route 89 are hoodoo formations similar to those in Bryce Canyon and Cedar Breaks. The Middle Jurassic Carmel Formation, named after Mount Carmel, is well exposed in this area.
