= Canoga, New York =

Hamlet in New York, United States

Coordinates: 42°51′10″N 76°44′55″W

Canoga is a hamlet in the Town of Fayette, Seneca County, New York, United States, along Cayuga Lake. It is located seven miles (11 km) southeast of the town of Seneca Falls, at an elevation of 449 feet (137 m). The primary cross roads where the hamlet is located are N.Y. Route 89 and Canoga Road (CR 121).

The word Canoga, or "Ga-no-geh" as called by native Cayuga people, means "place of the sweet water".

Canoga and the immediate area is home to some members of the Cayuga Nation. Nearby at Canoga Cemetery is a historical monument marking the birthplace of Seneca Chief Red Jacket, although it is currently unknown as to where he was actually born. According to Haudenosaunee history and tradition, Chief Red Jacket was born in 1750 at the former Indian village of Skannayutenate along Canoga Creek which was later burned in 1779 by troops under the command of Colonel Henry Dearborn during the Sullivan Expedition of the American Revolutionary War. As orator of the Six Nations of the Haudenosaunee, there are six stones at the base of the Chief Red Jacket birthplace monument mentioning each of the tribes belonging to the Haudenosaunee Confederacy.

Cayuga Lake State Park and Seneca Falls Country Club are located 4 miles (6.4 km) north of Canoga on N.Y. Route 89.
