= Penstemon bracteatus =

- Dixie National Forest, Garfield County, Utah

Conservation status
- Vulnerable (NatureServe)

Scientific classification
- Kingdom: Plantae
- Clade: Tracheophytes
- Clade: Angiosperms
- Clade: Eudicots
- Clade: Asterids
- Order: Lamiales
- Family: Plantaginaceae
- Genus: Penstemon
- Species: P. bracteatus

Binomial name
- Penstemon bracteatus D.D.Keck

Plant species in the veronica family

Penstemon bracteatus, the platy penstemon or Red Canyon penstemon, is a rare species from southwestern Utah.

== Description ==
The platy penstemon is a very small herb, usually only growing 3 to 12 centimeters (1–4.5 in) tall, but occasionally reaching 15 cm (6 in). Each plant produces one or a few flowering stems from a spreading rhizome-like caudex. The stems are hairless and glaucous, either growing straight upwards or having the base resting on the soil before turning upwards.

Plants have both basal leaves and ones attached to the flowering stems that are fleshy in texture with smooth edges. The basal and lowest leaves are 1–3.5 centimeters (0.5–1.5 in) long and 0.5–1.7 cm wide with a tapered base and obovate, teardrop shape and a rounded or widely angled tip. The stems will have just two to six leaves attached in pairs to opposite sides of the flowering stem. The upper ones attached directly by the leaf base and measure 1–2.9 cm by 0.5–1.2 cm. They are ovate to elliptic with a rounded end with the central rib sometimes extending out into a small nub.

Close up of flower showing floral guides and spreading lobes

The flowers are blue to violet or lavender and funnel shaped tubes of fused petals. They open to five spreading lobes and are 1.2–1.9 cm long, but are more typically 1.4–1.7 cm. The exterior of the flowers is hairless, but they have sparse white hairs on the lower side of the tube's interior and reddish-purple floral guide lines.

== Taxonomy ==
In 1934 a new species in the Penstemon genus was scientifically described by David D. Keck, naming it Penstemon bracteatus. Along with the wider genus it is part of the Plantaginaceae family. The species has no botanical synonyms.

=== Names ===
The species name is Botanical Latin meaning having bracts, from bracteate. Penstemon bracteatus is known by the common names platy penstemon, Red Canyon penstemon, or Red Canyon Beardtongue.

== Range and habitat ==
Platy penstemons are endemic to southwestern Utah on the Paunsaugunt Plateau, western foothills of the Escalante Mountains, and the western base of the Markagunt Plateau. They are documented in three counties, Garfield, Iron, and Kane. There they grow on the growing on pink or white limestone from the Claron Formation in areas near and within Bryce Canyon National Park and Red Canyon in the Dixie National Forest at elevations of 2,105 to 2,535 meters (6,906–8,317 ft). Its range covers between 1,000 and 5,000 square kilometers (390 and 1,930 sq mi) and there are 19 known populations.

The plants grow in broken stones, on talus slopes, and gravel from the limestone formations within open conifer forests, such as Rocky Mountain ponderosa pine forests, limber pine forests, or the Great Basin bristlecone pine and manzanita community.

== See also ==
- List of Penstemon species
