= Long Valley (Kane County, Utah) =

Valley in Kane County, Utah, United States

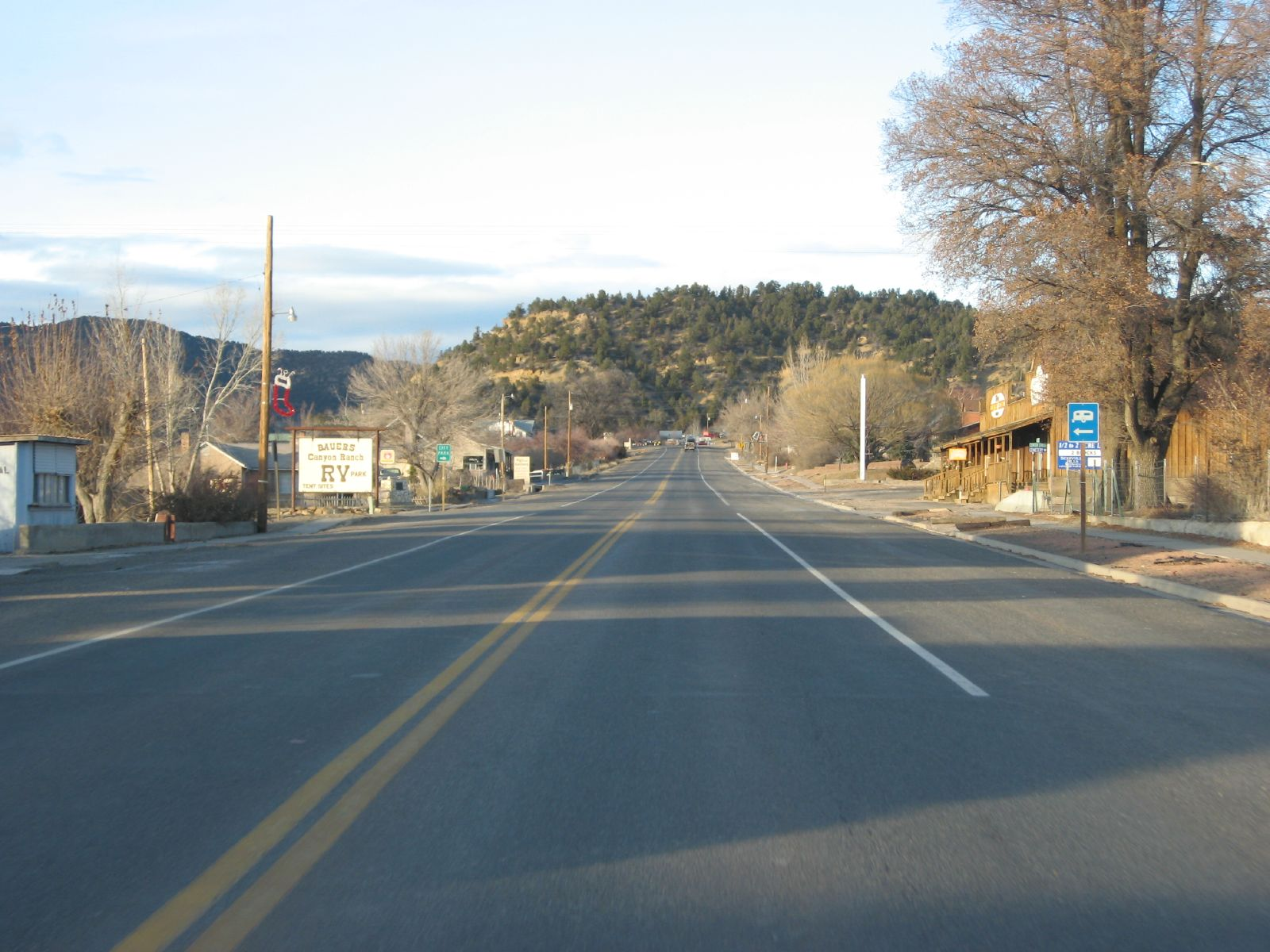
- Glendale, Utah at south Long Valley

Dimensions
- Length: 13 mi (21 km) SSW x NNE

Geography
- Location within Utah
- Country: United States
- State: Utah
- County: Kane
- Communities: Glendale and (Long Valley Junction)
- Range coordinates: 37°22′44″N 112°34′24″W
- Borders on: Kolob Terrace-W; Pink Cliffs-NW, (and E); Markagunt Plateau-NNW Long Valley Junction & (source)-Sevier River-N; (Paunsaugunt Plateau-E & NE); (Alton & Alton Amphitheater & Kanab Creek-E); Black Mountain (Long Valley)-E; Glendale Bench & White Cliffs-S (& SSE); East Fork Virgin River

The Long Valley of Utah is a 13-mile (21 km) long valley located in western Kane County. The valley is located in source water regions of waters flowing north, south, and southwest, in the west of the High Plateaus section of the Colorado Plateau; the High Plateaus section also extends into northern Arizona, the region north of the Grand Canyon.

Long Valley is on the east border of Kolob Terrace; the forested Markagunt and Paunsaugunt Plateaus border northwest, and northeast. East is a mountain region water divide, and the south-flowing Kanab Creek in its narrow river valley, (a north tributary to the Colorado River). The northern half of Long Valley and the two plateaus lie in the Dixie National Forest.

Glendale, Utah is located at the south end of the valley, on the East Fork Virgin River. U.S. Route 89 (US&8209;89) follows the East Fork river valley through the south half of Long Valley; the East Fork strikes east, (Stout Canyon, and feeder canyons and streams lie in the valley's northwest), and US&8209;89 exits the valley north-northeast at Long Valley Junction on the water divide-(Great Basin Divide), at the source waters of the north-flowing Sevier River.

The East Fork Virgin River flows due-south, from near the valley center, then just south of Glendale, the river starts its southwesterly course. The sourcewaters are in the valley's northeast terminus region in the Long Valley Junction area.

== Description ==
Long Valley is mostly a rivercourse valley of the East Fork Virgin River. The north contains a parallel valley in the northwest, which collects 3-mile (4.8 km) long streams flowing southeasterly off the water divide at the south-southeast of the Markagunt Plateau; the other side of the divide contains northeast-flowing Swains Creek.

=== 3 river sources ===
The east perimeter of Long Valley is a minor mountain peak section and water divide; east of the divide is the Alton Amphitheater, and Kanab Creek flows southerly to meet the Colorado River, in the Grand Canyon. The source of Kanab Creek is on the southwest of the Paunsaugunt Plateau; at the source region, east, Upper Kanab Creek flows northeast, as a southwest tributary to the north-flowing East Sevier River.

West of the Kanab Creek source is the source of East Fork Virgin River, in the region at Long Valley Junction. The junction lies just northwest of Alton, and the Alton Amphitheater. The East Fork Virgin River flows south through Long Valley, then southwest to meet the Virgin River, which is a northeast tributary to Lake Mead.

== Access, and valley routes ==
US&8209;89 is the major access to the valley, from Mount Carmel-Orderville, 4 miles (6.4 km) southwest of Glendale. Another paved route enters the valley, and Glendale from the east, ("Lower Kanab Creek to Alton Rd"); the route is from US&8209;89, east of Kanab, and traverses north, then northeast to Long Valley, after going through west perimeter areas of the Grand Staircase–Escalante National Monument.

Alton Road enters northeast Long Valley from Alton, Utah, and the Alton Amphitheater which lies east. The Alton Amphitheater is at a section of the Pink Cliffs, and the source region of south-flowing (to the Colorado River), Kanab Creek, which lies adjacent to the north-northeast.

The northwest of the valley contains Stout Canyon Road, through Stout Canyon, a paved route to Utah State Route 14 on the water divide, (Great Basin Divide), west of Long Valley Junction. The south end of the Stout Canyon Road connects to Long Valley's center region, US&8209;89, just west of Spencer Bench. Another route exits west and northwest off Stout Canyon Road; it connects to Swains Creek Road, a northeast-flowing stream, at the northeast of Kolob Terrace, and on the south perimeter of the Markagunt Plateau.

A partially paved route exits US&8209;89 at valley center to reach Black Mountain, 7,777 feet (2,370 m), and then continues southeasterly on an unimproved route extension to Buck Knoll, 6,738 feet (2,054 m), about 9-mi total distance from Long Valley center.

Long Valley

Geography
- Countries: United States and Mexico
- Parent range: Great Basin Divide (southwest)-Utah

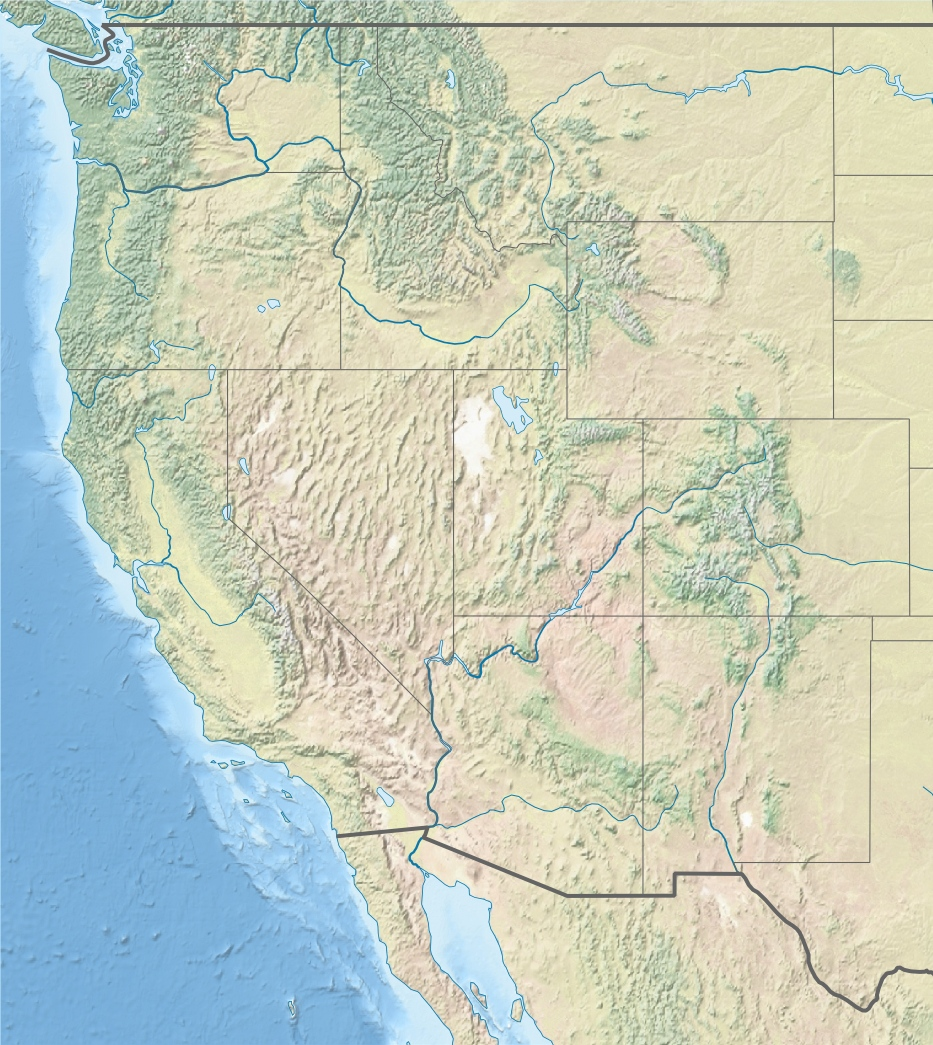
Great Basin Divide
-triple pt, -overflow pt, -border, -other
