= Paria River =

American river, northeast Arizona, east border of Paria Plateau

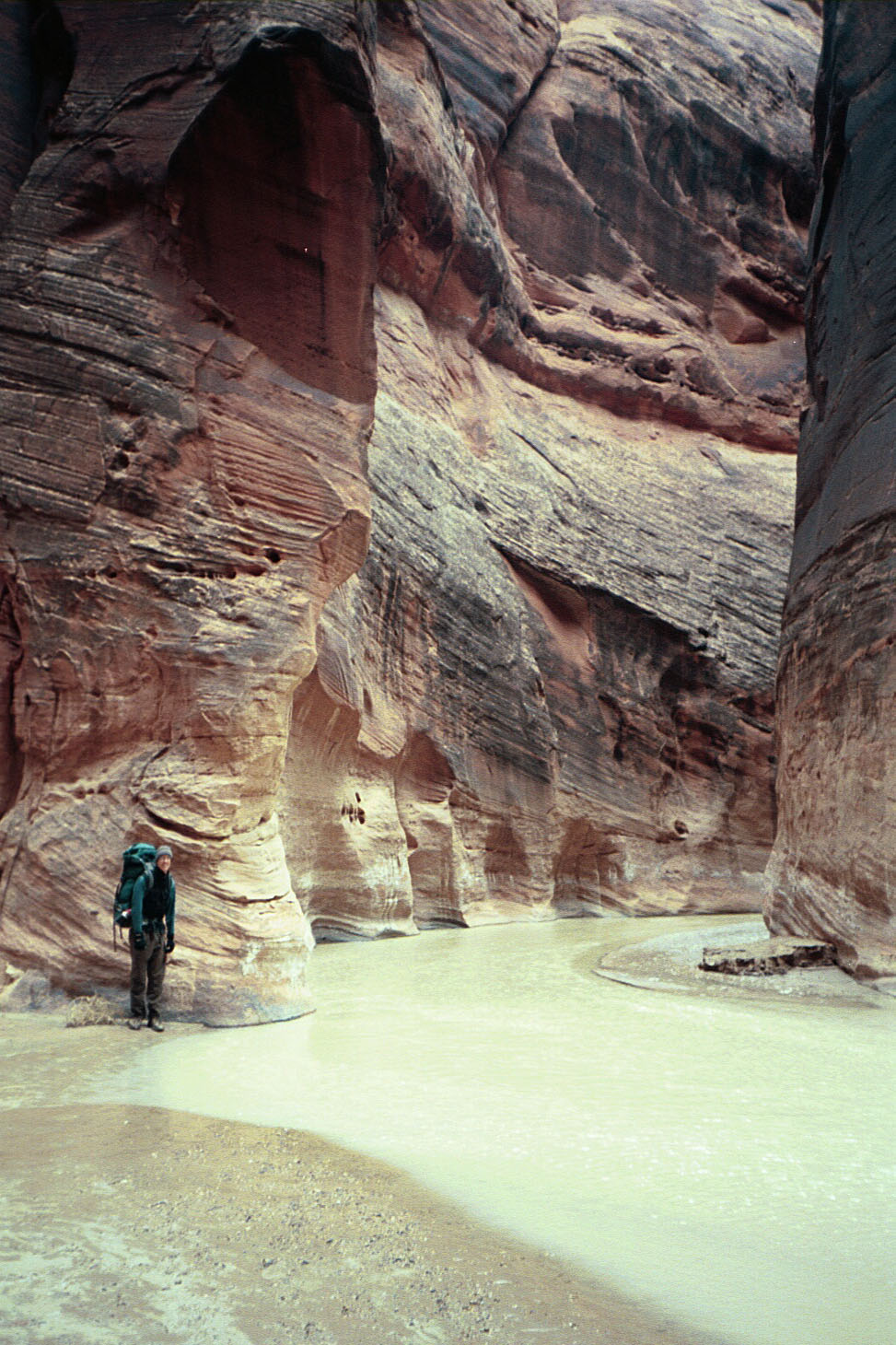
- A backpacker at the confluence of Buckskin Gulch and the Paria River

Location
- Country: United States
- State: Utah, Arizona
- Counties: Garfield, Kane, Coconino

Physical characteristics
- Source: Near the Pink Cliffs
  - location: Tropic, Utah
  - coordinates: 37°39′07″N 112°04′41″W
  - elevation: 6,437 ft (1,962 m)
- Mouth: Colorado River
  - location: Lee's Ferry, Arizona
  - coordinates: 36°51′31″N 111°36′03″W
  - elevation: 3,084 ft (940 m)
- Length: 95 mi (153 km)
- Basin size: 1,410 mi^{2} (3,700 km^{2})
- Discharge
  - location: Lee's Ferry
  - average: 28 cu ft/s (0.79 m^{3}/s)
  - minimum: 1 cu ft/s (0.028 m^{3}/s)
  - maximum: 16,100 cu ft/s (460 m^{3}/s)

The Paria River (/pəˈriːə/, rhymes with "Maria") is a tributary of the Colorado River, approximately 95 miles (153 km) long, in southern Utah and northern Arizona in the United States. It drains a rugged and arid region northwest of the Colorado, flowing through roadless slot canyons along part of its course. The name Paria (also spelled "Pahreah") is derived from the language of the Ute and Southern Paiute peoples in the area, meaning "mud water".

== Geography ==
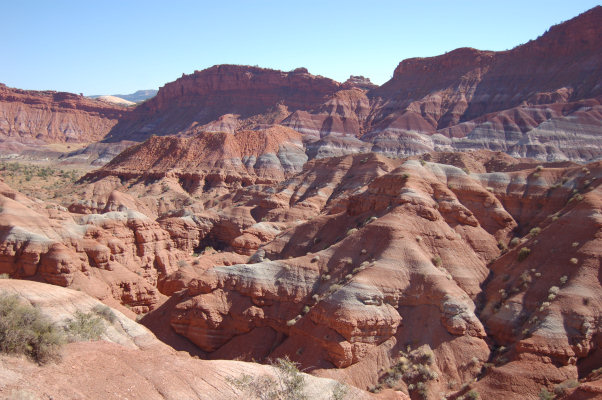
A portion of upper Paria Canyon

The Paria is formed in southern Utah, in southwestern Garfield County from several creeks that descend from the edge of the Paunsaugunt Plateau, meeting just north of Tropic. It flows SSE across Kane County and Grand Staircase–Escalante National Monument. Along the Arizona state line, it descends through the Vermilion Cliffs in the Paria Canyon and onto the Paria Plateau. It joins the Colorado from the northwest approximately 5 mi (8 km) southwest of Page, Arizona and the Glen Canyon Dam. The lower 20 mi (32 km) of the river are within the Paria Canyon-Vermilion Cliffs Wilderness, which is administered by the Bureau of Land Management; a permit is required for any overnight visit. The Paria is essentially a large creek and is not navigable.

A 2004 study estimated that the Tropic Ditch, a historic artificial irrigation canal that diverts water from the East Fork Sevier River, loses 1060 acre-feet per year to seepage, and half of that seepage (530 acre-feet per year) ends up in the Paria River, bringing with it 1829 tons of salt per year. To help restore the salinity of the Paria and Colorado Rivers to more natural levels, the Tropic and East Fork Irrigation Company have proposed replacing the last 5.5 miles of the ditch with a pipeline. The cost may be supplemented by a grant from the Bureau of Reclamation's Colorado River Basin Salinity Control Program.

== Attractions ==
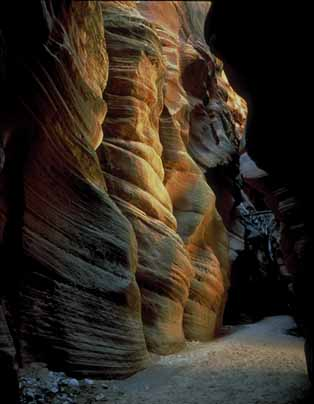
Buckskin Gulch

The Paria is one of the most popular destinations for canyoneering in the region. Buckskin Gulch, a side canyon along the river in the narrows section, is considered to be one of the longest and deepest slot canyons in the United States. The Paria is also home to several important historical, geological, and biological resources. Lee's Ferry and the adjoining settlement are located within the canyon upstream of the confluence with the Colorado River, with several other abandoned settlements further north. The Paria and several nearby rivers and canyons also are the site of several well-preserved specimens of Native American petroglyphs, prehistoric drawings, and symbols carved into stone. The Paria boasts a vibrant desert riparian habitat that is home to several sensitive and endangered species and is also the location of Wrather Arch, the longest natural arch outside of Utah (although this claim may be superseded by Aloba Arch).

About a mile south of the river and the ghost town of Paria is the Paria Movie Set which was the site for several western movies. The old film set in the canyon was a popular attraction but was damaged in a flash flood in 1998. The buildings were dismantled and rebuilt in a nearby location by volunteers. In 2006 these new buildings were destroyed in a suspicious fire.

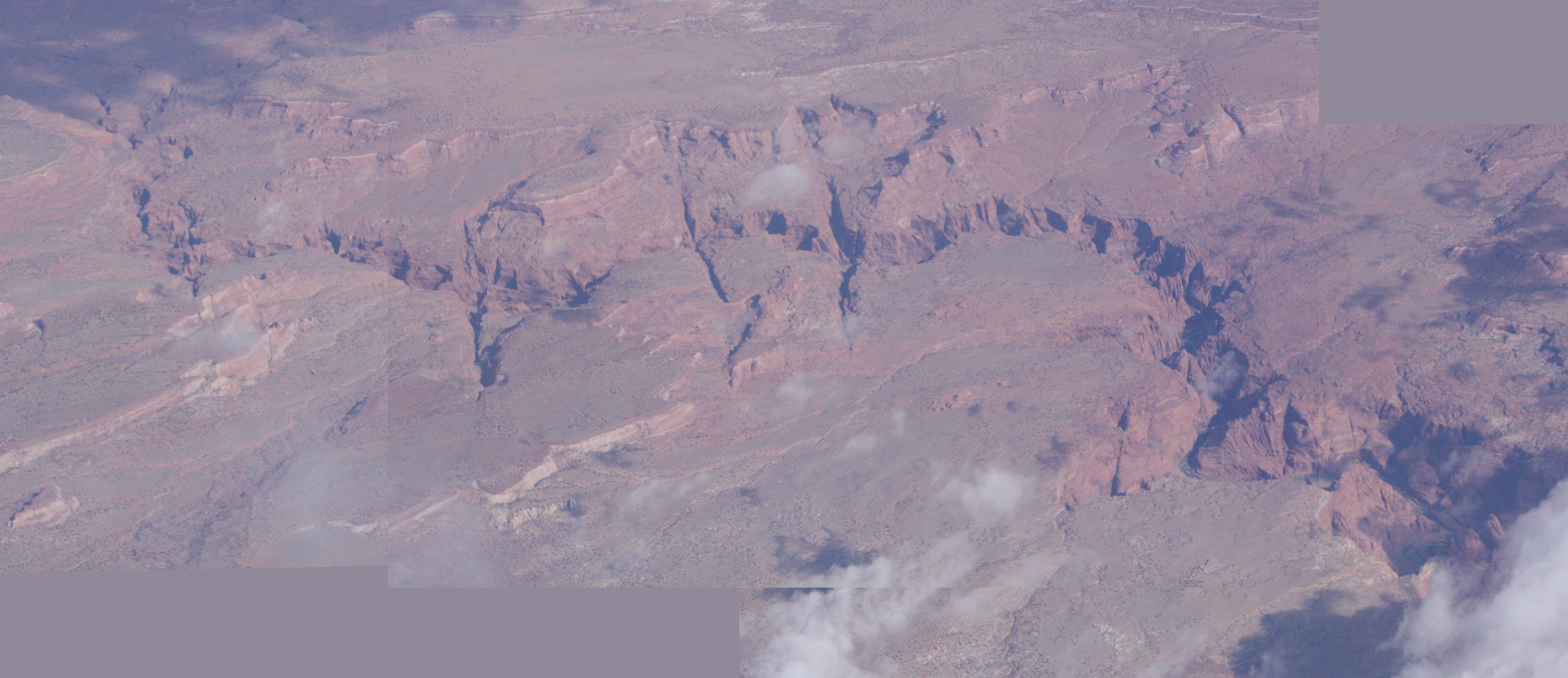
Paria River Canyon

== See also ==
- List of rivers of Arizona
- List of rivers of Utah
- List of tributaries of the Colorado River
