= Orderville, Utah =

- Town
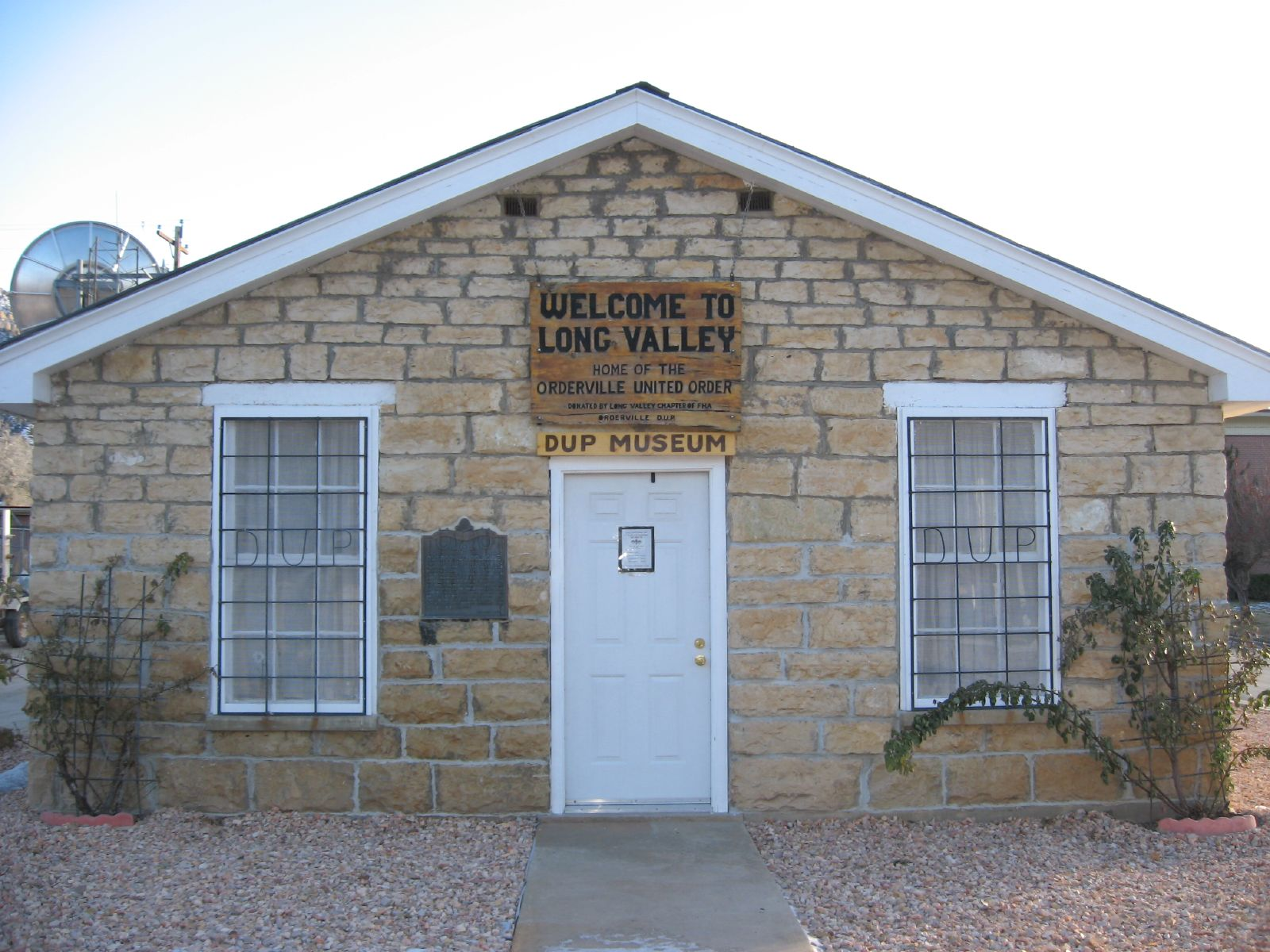
- Orderville museum of the Daughters of Utah Pioneers, December 2007

- Location within Kane County and the State of Utah

- Location of Utah within the United States
- Coordinates: 37°15′44″N 112°39′12″W
- Country: United States
- State: Utah
- County: Kane
- Founded: 1875
- Incorporated: 1934
- Named for: United Order

Government
  - Mayor: Ray Spencer

Area
  - Total: 8.72 sq mi (22.58 km^{2})
  - Land: 8.72 sq mi (22.58 km^{2})
  - Water: 0 sq mi (0.00 km^{2})
- Elevation: 5,449 ft (1,661 m)

Population (2020)
  - Total: 598
  - Density: 67.9/sq mi (26.22/km^{2})
- Time zone: UTC-7 (Mountain (MST))
  - Summer (DST): UTC-6 (MDT)
- ZIP code: 84758
- Area code: 435
- FIPS code: 49-57080
- GNIS feature ID: 1431023
- Website: orderville.utah.gov

Orderville is a town in western Kane County, Utah, United States. The population was 598 at the 2020 census. The town was founded and operated under the United Order of the Church of Jesus Christ of Latter-day Saints. This system allowed the community to flourish for some time, but ultimately ended in 1885.

== History ==
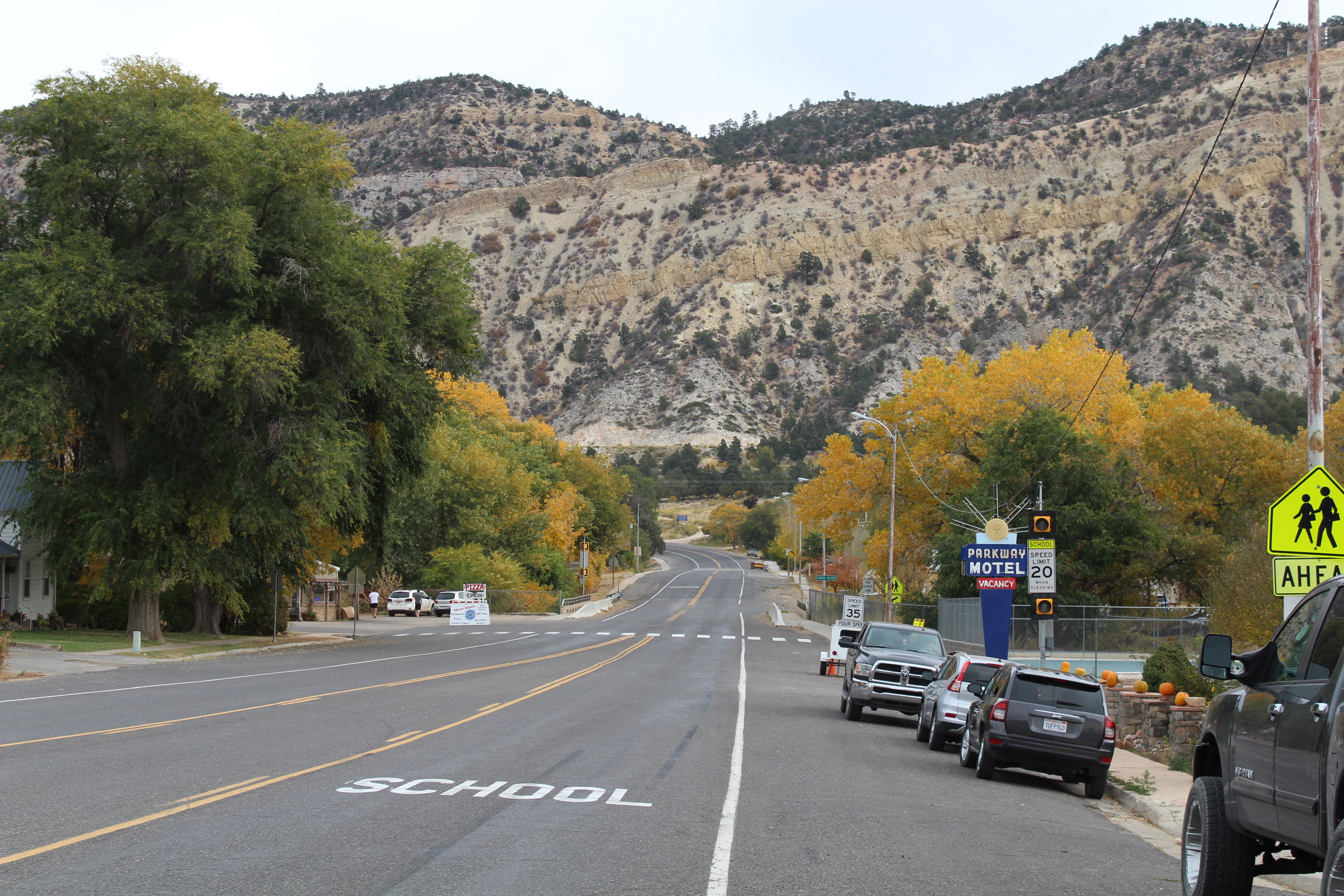
Looking east along East State Street US-89 in Orderville, with the Elkhart Cliffs in the background, October 2017

=== Distribution of goods and services ===
Orderville was established at the direction of LDS Church president Brigham Young in 1875 specifically to live the United Order, a voluntary form of communal living defined by Joseph Smith. Orderville was settled primarily by destitute refugees from failed settlements on the Muddy River in Nevada. When it was settled, Orderville included 335 acres (136 ha) of land and contained 18 houses, 19 oxen, 103 cows, 43 horses, 500 sheep, 30 hogs, 400 chickens, and 30,000 feet of lumber. The settlement began completely debt-free.

Homes were one- or two-room apartment units arranged around the town square. Community dining halls and public buildings were constructed. The dining hall began operation for the town on July 24, 1875, and prepared meals for more than 80 families. Men ate first, followed by women and children. Meal times were scheduled at 7 am, 12 pm, and 6 pm.

Under the United Order, no person in Orderville could have private property, as it was all considered to be God's land. Each person was made a steward over some personal effects, and every family a steward over a home. During the first two years, the settlers worked without receiving income. They were allowed to use supplies and take food as needed. The bishop of Orderville oversaw the distribution of goods. Credits were recorded for all work done by men, women, and children and used to obtain needed materials and keep track of the labor done in the settlement. In 1877, the order began a price system to replace the credit system, and monetary values were assigned to all labor and goods. At the beginning of each year, debts were forgiven, and those who had earned a surplus voluntarily gave it back to the order.

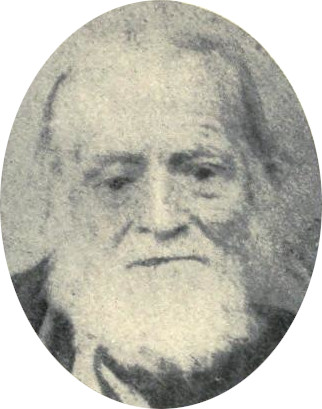
Orderville physician Priddy Meeks

The settlers there grew their own crops and had some small farms surrounding the settlement. They also used local materials to make their own soap, brooms, buckets, furniture, etc. Orderville settlers produced silk thread and wove it into articles of clothing. They later opened up their own tannery. There were blacksmiths, clerks, artists, musicians, and other professions. Priddy Meeks came to Orderville to serve as the settlement's doctor in 1876. Ten percent of the net increase of Orderville was donated to the Church of Jesus Christ of Latter-day Saints to follow the law of tithing.

=== Management ===
The group was managed by an annually-elected Board of Management consisting of nine men who bought and sold goods on behalf of the entire settlement. They also directed labor performed by the settlers. The president was the bishop, and the vice presidents were usually his counselors. Thus, there was a very close connection between spiritual and secular. Orderville was divided into 33 departments, and each year members of the board met with the department directors to determine what the needs were and how many workers would be proportioned to the department.

In order for new members to join, the entire community had to vote. A new member was welcomed into Orderville only if the admission vote was a two-thirds majority. All newcomers were interviewed to determine their motives for wanting to join the society. They were also asked a number of questions regarding their moral and spiritual habits. New members had to agree to follow the strict standards and conditions of the settlement, including no swearing and giving up tobacco, tea, and coffee. Brigham Young cautioned against "allowing those whom might become parasites on the body from becoming members." When members wanted to leave, they were given back the capital they had initially invested along with their surplus credits for that year. If the members leaving had debts, they were usually forgiven.

=== Success ===
Although the United Order was practiced in many Utah communities during the late 1870s, Orderville was unique in both the level of success it experienced under the communal living style, and in the duration of the experiment. In the course of a few years, Orderville grew into a thriving, self-sufficient community. The success and relative wealth of the community attracted more settlers, and Orderville grew to about 700 people. Orderville not only provided for the needs of its population, but produced a significant surplus for sale to other communities, which was used to purchase additional land and equipment. The extreme poverty of these settlers likely contributed significantly to their devotion to the principles of the United Order.

=== Economic Expansion and the End of the Order ===
The Order continued in Orderville for approximately 10 years. During the early 1870s, the economic environment improved in southern Utah. The discovery of silver nearby led to railroad facilities and an influx of people to the area. Local farmers were able to find a market for their goods and gained more profit. The neighboring towns that had once bought goods from Orderville now found themselves able to import materials from other regions. Orderville goods became "old fashioned".

The youth of Orderville envied the youth in other communities and the so-called Pants Rebellion is one example of how the youth influenced economic change. One young man started collecting wool from docked lamb tails. After collecting enough, he secretly went to Nephi where he traded the wool for a pair of store-bought cotton pants. Scandal ensued when he wore the pants to a social dance which excited the other youth, including one young woman running up and kissing him. Upon investigation, the Elders determined the pants were communal property and confiscated them; however, they allowed tailors to use the pants as a pattern. The new style was so popular that young people were using the grindstone to purposely wear down their old pants in order to get new ones. The Pants Rebellion ended when the Elders eventually gave in, began importing cotton cloth, and gave tailors permission to make cotton pants in new styles.

Other social and economic changes began to change community life. The communal dining system was abandoned in 1880. Three years later the value system assigned to labor was adjusted, introducing a level of inequality that had not existed before. Families were also given their own spending money. These changes led to tension and much internal disruption of the Order. While these internal conflicts and changes eventually would have led to the end of the practice of the United Order in Orderville, national legislation ensured it. In 1885, the enforcement of the Edmunds Anti-Polygamy Act of 1882 effectively ended the order by jailing many of the order's leaders and driving many of the others underground. Members of the community held an auction using their credits as payment. Orderville continued its tannery, wool factory, and sheep enterprise, which were overseen by the Board of Management until 1889.

Orderville's current leadership is headed by Mayor Lyle Goulding.

== Geography ==
Orderville is in western Kane County within the Long Valley, formed by the East Fork of the Virgin River. U.S. Route 89 passes through the town, leading north 4 miles (6 km) to Glendale and 45 miles (72 km) to Panguitch, and south 21 miles (34 km) to Kanab, the Kane county seat.

According to the United States Census Bureau, the town has a total area of 9.2 square miles (23.7 km^{2}), all land. Its current limits include the former incorporated communities of Mount Carmel and Mount Carmel Junction. From Mount Carmel Junction, Utah State Route 9 leads west 23 miles (37 km) to Zion National Park.

=== Climate ===
This region experiences warm (but not hot) and dry summers, with no average monthly temperatures above 73.1 °F (22.8 °C). According to the Köppen Climate Classification system, Orderville has a warm-summer Mediterranean climate, abbreviated "Csb" on climate maps.

== Demographics ==
Historical population
Census	Pop.	Note	%±
1880	514		—
1890	289		−43.8%
1900	418		44.6%
1910	380		−9.1%
1920	378		−0.5%
1930	439		16.1%
1940	441		0.5%
1950	371		−15.9%
1960	398		7.3%
1970	399		0.3%
1980	423		6.0%
1990	422		−0.2%
2000	596		41.2%
2010	577		−3.2%
2020	598		3.6%
U.S. Decennial Census

As of the census of 2010, there were 577 people, 209 households, and 155 families residing in the town. The racial makeup of the town was 98.1% White, 0.2% Native American, 0.2% from other races, and .7% from two or more races. Hispanic or Latino of any race were 2.4% of the population.

There were 209 households, out of which 25% had children under the age of 18 living with them, 65.1% were married couples living together, 7.7% had a female householder with no husband present, and 25.8% were non-families. 30.6% of all households were made up of individuals, and 11.9% had someone living alone who was 65 years of age or older. The average household size was 2.76 and the average family size was 3.28.

In the town, the population was spread out, with 30.6% under the age of 18, 5% from 20 to 24, 16.8% from 25 to 44, 23% from 45 to 64, and 17.1% who were 65 years of age or older. The median age was 42.5 years. The total female population was 49.7% with 50.3% being male.

The median income for a household in the town was $51,838 in 2015. Males had a median income of $29,375 versus $15,000 for females. 6.2% of people in Orderville were below the poverty line. 17.9% of the population does not have health insurance. The median value for a house is $125,800.

== See also ==
- List of cities and towns in Utah
- List of named highway junctions in Utah
