= Glendale, Utah =

- Town
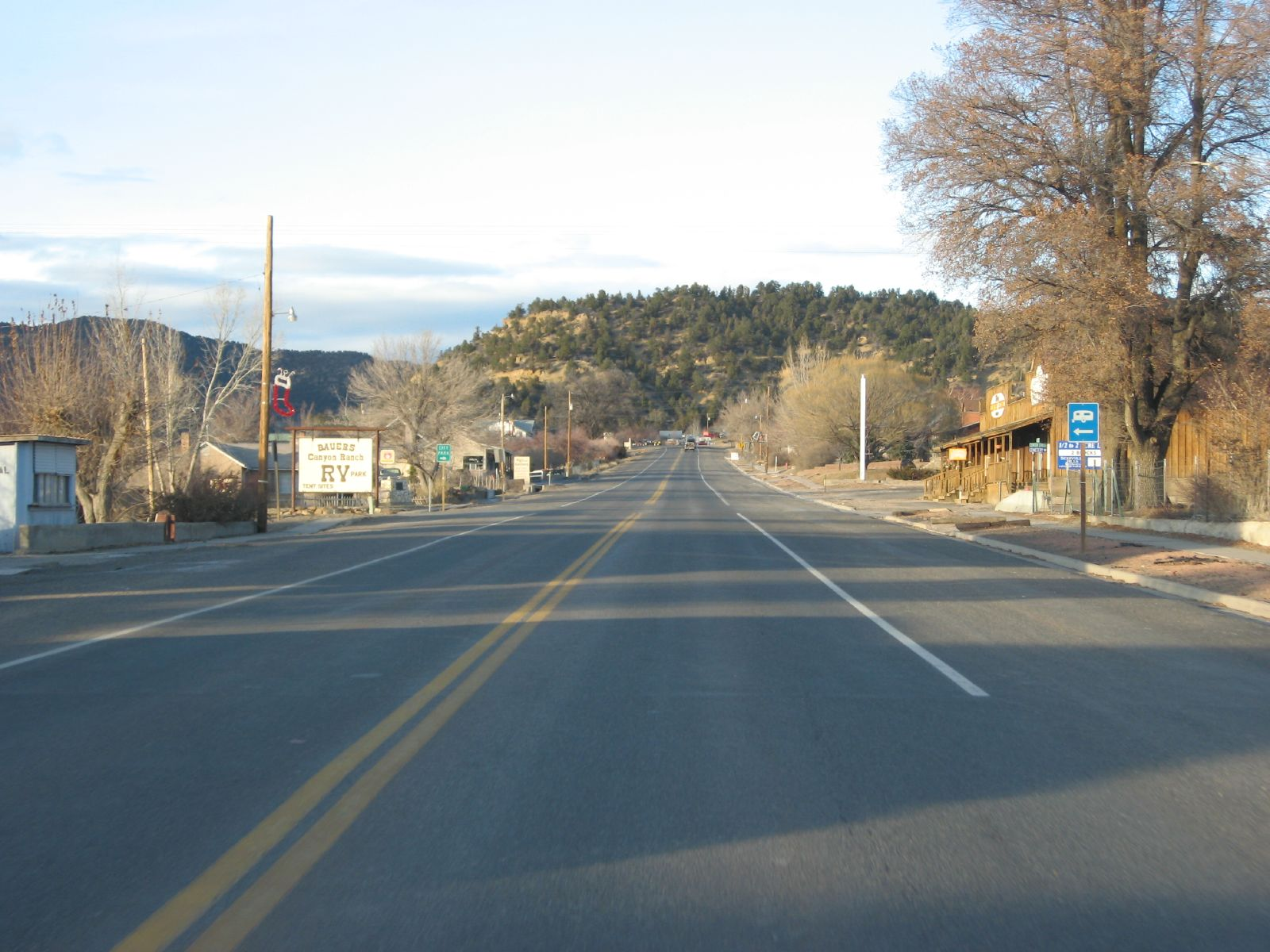
- U.S. Route 89 passing through Glendale

- Location in Kane County and the state of Utah

- Location of Utah in the United States
- Coordinates: 37°19′55″N 112°36′5″W
- Country: United States
- State: Utah
- County: Kane
- Founded: 1862
- Incorporated: March 29, 1935

Area
  - Total: 7.00 sq mi (18.12 km^{2})
  - Land: 7.00 sq mi (18.12 km^{2})
  - Water: 0 sq mi (0.00 km^{2})
- Elevation: 5,778 ft (1,761 m)

Population (2020)
  - Total: 312
  - Density: 58.2/sq mi (22.46/km^{2})
- Time zone: UTC-7 (Mountain (MST))
  - Summer (DST): UTC-6 (MDT)
- ZIP code: 84729
- Area code: 435
- FIPS code: 49-29360
- GNIS feature ID: 1428204
- Website: www.glendaletownutah.gov

Glendale is a town in Kane County, Utah, United States. The population was 312 at the 2020 census.

== History ==
Glendale was originally called "Berryville", and under the latter name permanent settlement was first made in 1864. Sources differ whether the town was named for glens and dales near the town site, or after Glendale, Scotland, the native home of a share of the early settlers.

== Geography ==
Glendale is located in western Kane County at an elevation of 5,800 feet (1,800 m) in Long Valley, along the East Fork of the Virgin River. U.S. Route 89 passes through the town as it follows the valley, leading southwest 4 miles (6 km) to Orderville and north 41 miles (66 km) to Panguitch.

According to the United States Census Bureau, Glendale has a total area of 7.8 square miles (20.2 km^{2}), all of it land.

Glendale Bench Road leads east from Glendale to the Grand Staircase–Escalante National Monument (GSENM). The rustic and scenic road meets Skutumpah Road, running through the GSENM and ending at one of the GSENM Visitor Centers in Cannonville, near Bryce Canyon.

== Demographics ==
Historical population
Census	Pop.	Note	%±
1880	338		—
1890	253		−25.1%
1900	319		26.1%
1910	244		−23.5%
1920	250		2.5%
1930	239		−4.4%
1940	297		24.3%
1950	226		−23.9%
1960	223		−1.3%
1970	200		−10.3%
1980	237		18.5%
1990	282		19.0%
2000	355		25.9%
2010	381		7.3%
2020	312		−18.1%
Source: U.S. Census Bureau

As of the census of 2000, there were 355 people, 116 households, and 88 families residing in the town. The population density was 45.5 people per square mile (17.6/km^{2}). There were 149 housing units at an average density of 19.1 per square mile (7.4/km^{2}). The racial makeup of the town was 99.15% White, 0.56% Native American, and 0.28% from two or more races. Hispanic or Latino of any race were 3.94% of the population.

There were 116 households, out of which 38.8% had children under 18 living with them, 71.6% were married couples living together, 4.3% had a female householder with no husband present, and 23.3% were non-families. 20.7% of all households were made up of individuals, and 9.5% had someone living alone who was 65 years of age or older. The average household size was 3.06, and the average family size was 3.62.

In the town, the population was spread out, with 34.1% under 18, 8.5% from 18 to 24, 21.1% from 25 to 44, 23.1% from 45 to 64, and 13.2% who were 65 years of age or older. The median age was 31 years. For every 100 females, there were 107.6 males. For every 100 females aged 18 and over, there were 101.7 males.

The median income for a household in the town was $35,938, and the median income for a family was $38,500. Males had a median income of $24,722 versus $20,000 for females. The per capita income for the town was $17,322. About 5.4% of families and 8.1% of the population were below the poverty line, including 15.0% of those under age 18 and none of those age 65 or over.

== History ==
In 1862 ranchers came to Long Valley, land east of the future Zion National Park, to graze cattle along the East Fork of the Virgin River. Robert and Isabella Berry named the area "Berryville". In 1866 after local indigenous tribes killed the Berrys, the other settlers left.

In 1871 Mormons from the Muddy River settlement in Nevada came to settle, naming their town "Glendale". The people of St. Thomas, Nevada, relocated en masse to Glendale that year, preserving their old ward organization in the new location. By the late 1800s, the Mormon communities in the area had grown in the nearby towns of Orderville and Mt Carmel Junction, and Glendale became part of the United Order, a program of economic and moral reform that began in 1874 under Brigham Young.

On March 29, 1935, Glendale became an incorporated town. The towns of Mount Carmel, Orderville, and Glendale are known as Long Valley.
