= Bald Knoll =

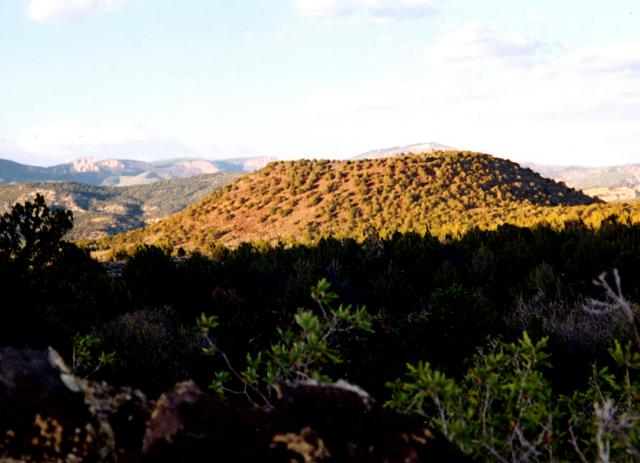
- Bald Knoll is the youngest of a group of cinder cones on the SW part of the Paunsaugunt Plateau in southern Utah.

Highest point
- Elevation: 7,005 ft (2,135 m)
- Listing: Volcanoes of the United States
- Coordinates: 37°19′38″N 112°24′32″W

Geography
- Location within Utah

Geology
- Mountain type: Cinder cone
- Last eruption: Unknown

Bald Knoll, also called Black Knoll, Buck Knoll or Corral Knoll, is a cinder cone in Utah, in the Southwestern United States.

It is the youngest volcano at the southwest portion of the Paunsaugunt Plateau and it consists of basaltic lava with a well-preserved volcanic crater at its summit.
