= Paria, Utah =

- Ghost town
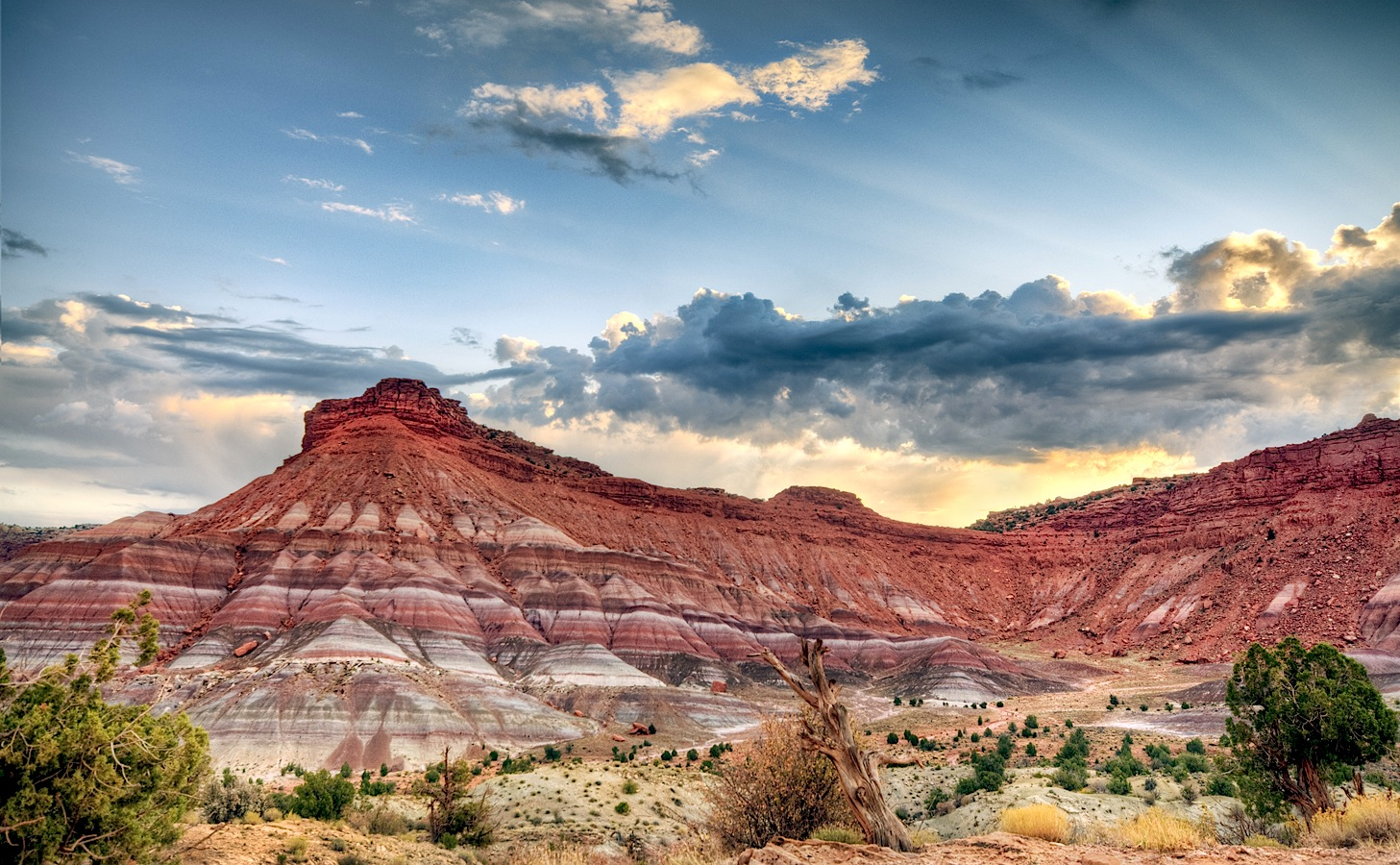
- Site of Paria, October 2011

- Location within Utah Location within the United States
- Coordinates: 37°14′54″N 111°56′57″W
- Country: United States
- State: Utah
- County: Kane
- Established: 1870
- Abandoned: 1929
- Named for: Paria River
- Elevation: 4,747 ft (1,447 m)
- GNIS feature ID: 1455097

Paria or Pahreah (/pəˈriːə/, rhymes with "Maria"), is a ghost town on the Paria River in Grand Staircase–Escalante National Monument in central Kane County, Utah, United States. It was inhabited from 1870 to 1929, and later used as a filming location.

== History ==
The area was first settled in 1865 by a Mormon group led by Peter Shirts. This early settlement was named Rockhouse, for Shirts's strongly built sandstone house. After the end of the Black Hawk War in 1867 settlers began to arrive at a rapid pace. Farming produced good crops for several years, but irrigation was very difficult; each spring the surface runoff water was absorbed into the desert soil too quickly to properly water the fields. In 1870 the residents agreed to move the settlement. They divided in two groups; half the people went about 5 miles (8.0 km) upstream and founded the town of Pahreah. The name Pahreah was derived from the language of the Ute and Southern Paiute peoples in the area, meaning "mud water".

In 1871, early Mormon leader and pioneer John D. Lee came to the Paria area, fleeing investigators of the Mountain Meadows massacre. He constructed a dam and irrigation ditches with the help of many locals and passersby, including members of John Wesley Powell's second Colorado River expedition.

Paria grew through the 1870s, gaining a general store, church, and a number of sandstone houses as the population grew. However, the town was hit hard in the 1880s. The Paria River flooded every year from 1883 to 1888, washing away fields and even some buildings. People started to move away. By 1892 there were only eight families left, but for some reason the town was granted a post office that year, under the name Paria. Not much changed until a small gold mining operation was established here in 1911. Within a year, that too was wiped out by flooding. The post office closed in 1914. A lone bachelor prospector held out until 1929, then Paria was empty.

== Filming location ==
Preserved modern Paria movie set

In the 1940s the film industry became interested in using the picturesque ghost town, with its canyon vista background, as a location for making Westerns. Several scenes for Buffalo Bill were shot here in 1943, but crews were in a constant struggle against the flooding Paria River. Producers of other movies and television programs used Paria more or less throughout the 1950s. Then in 1961 the old ghost town was used as a major location for the Rat Pack film Sergeants 3, the largest western ever filmed in Kane County. Not satisfied with what remained of Paria, the film's creators constructed an imitation Old West town about a mile to the west. Visitors often confused this movie set with the real Paria, as it fell into disuse after the filming of The Outlaw Josey Wales in 1975.

After more flash flooding severely damaged the set in 1998, a team of volunteers and employees of the Bureau of Land Management disassembled the wreckage and replaced the structures in 1999–2001. New interpretive signs explained the movie set's significance and distinguished it from Paria itself. Then in 2006 the rebuilt set was destroyed by a suspicious fire.

In 2007, Paria was used as a filming location by the independent film The Attic Door. A facade of a house was built in the footprint of the previous set, then moved to the nearby town of Kanab.

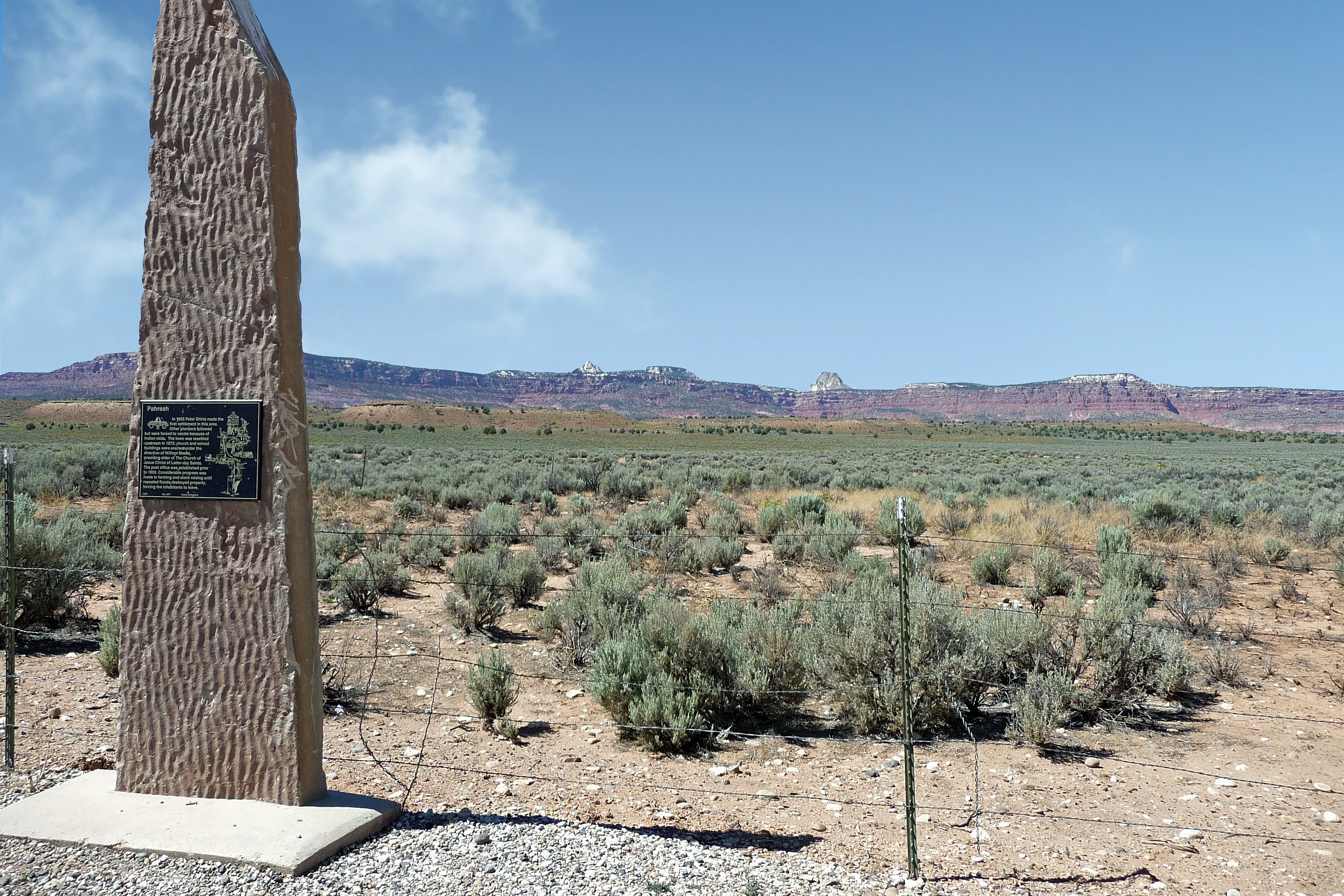
A historical marker at the former site of Pariah, Utah.

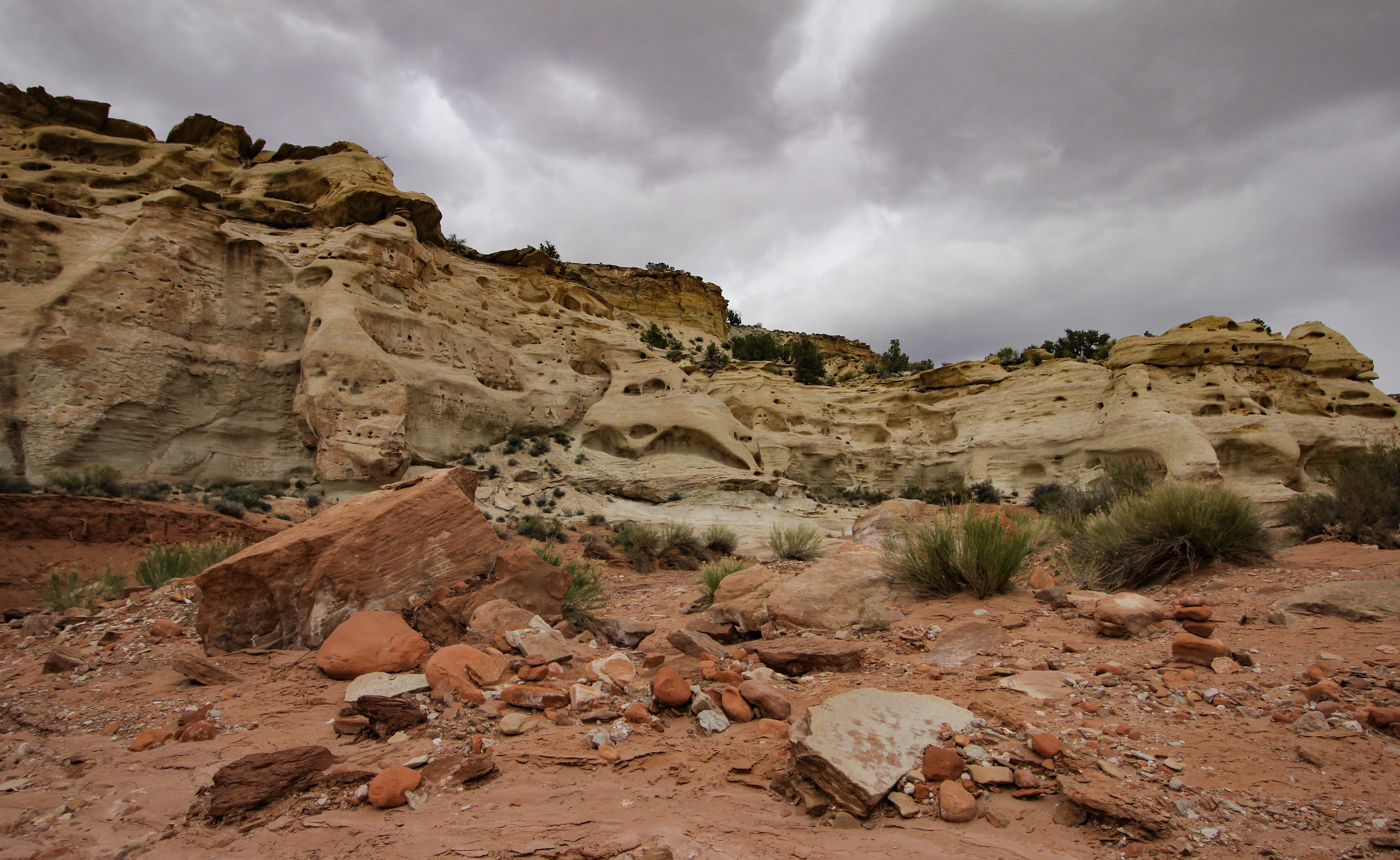
Rugged and rocky landscape near Pariah, Utah.

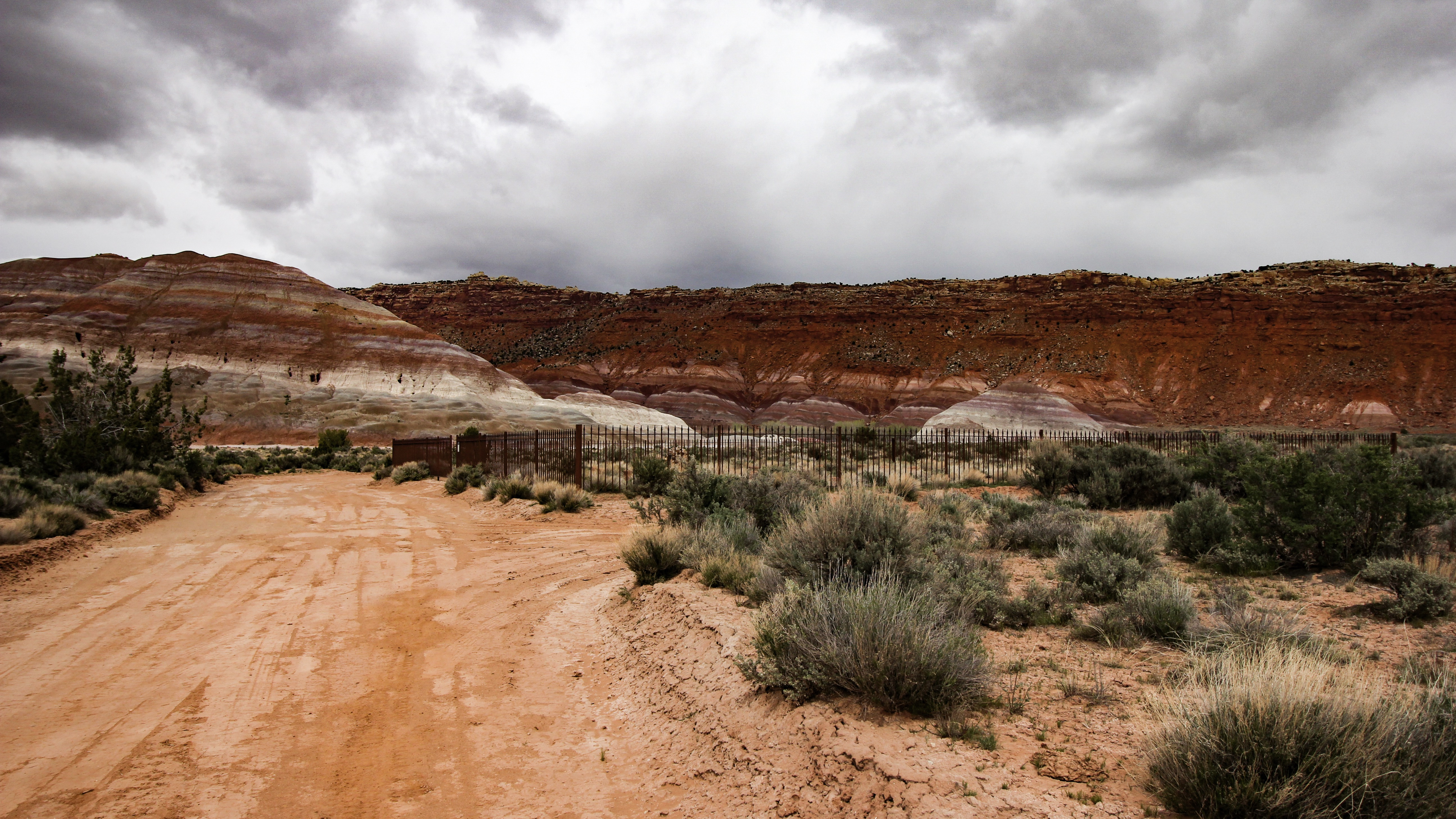
Paria, Utah, landscape, ghost town and filming location.

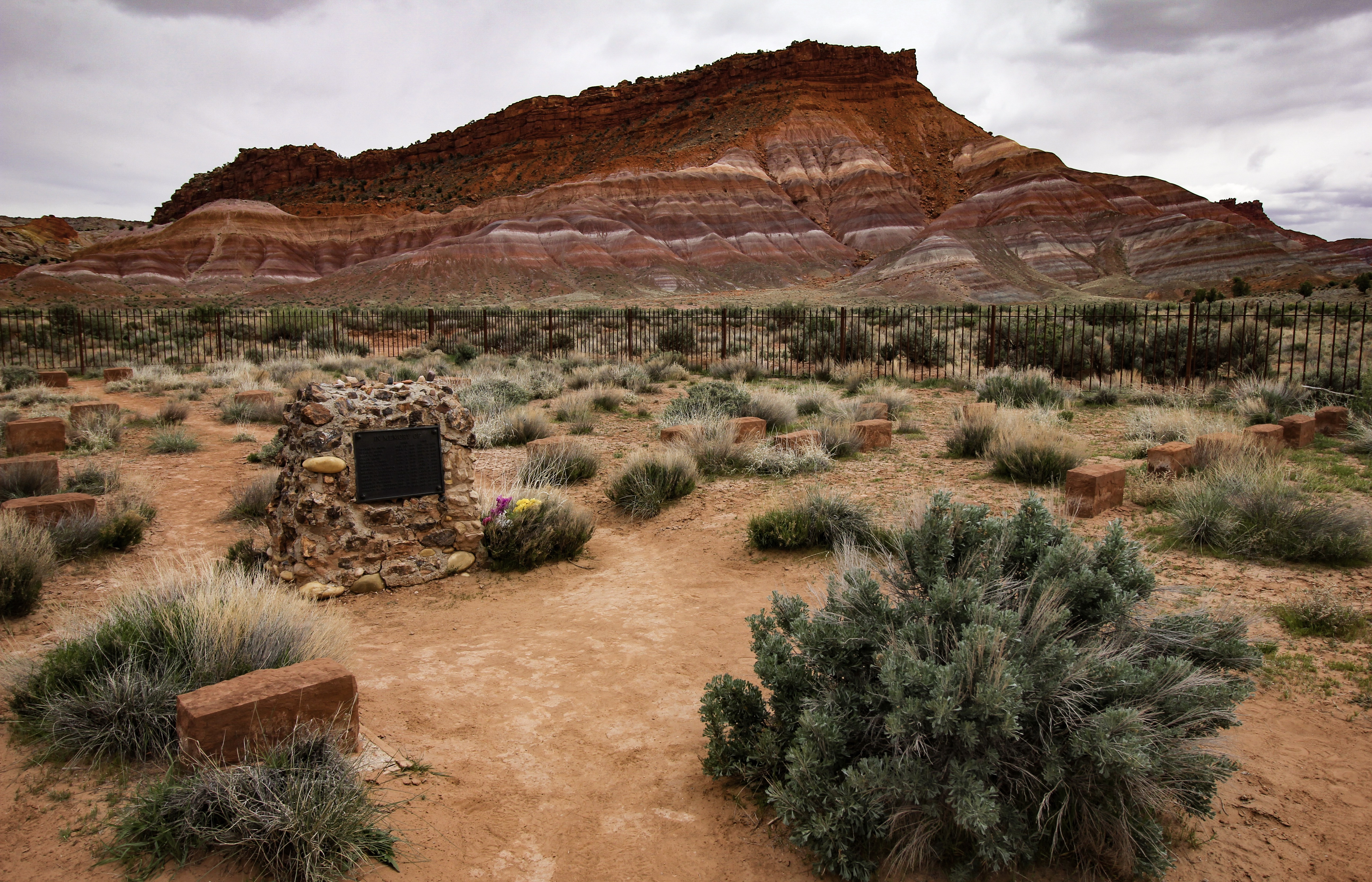
Inside the Pariah, Utah ghost town cemetery.

== See also ==
- List of ghost towns in Utah
