= Grand Staircase =

Landform in Utah and Arizona, United States

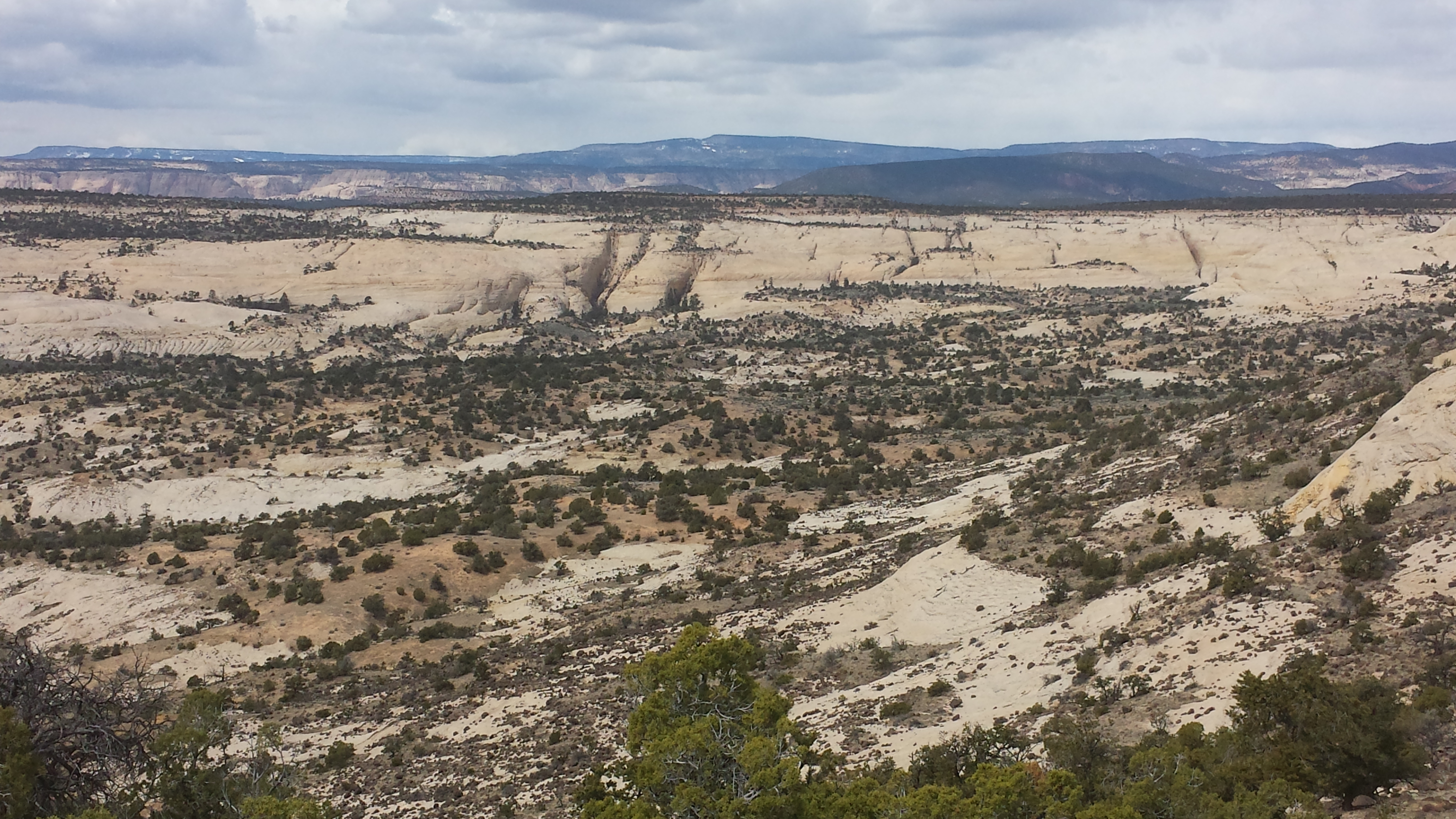
View from Utah Highway 12 of Grand Staircase–Escalante National Monument

The Grand Staircase is an immense sequence of sedimentary rock layers that stretches south from Bryce Canyon National Park and Grand Staircase–Escalante National Monument, through Zion National Park, and into Grand Canyon National Park.

== Characterization ==
In the 1870s, geologist Clarence Dutton first conceptualized this region as a huge stairway ascending out of the bottom of the Grand Canyon northward with the cliff edge of each layer forming giant steps. Dutton divided this layer cake of Earth history into five steps from the youngest (uppermost) rocks:

- Pink Cliffs
- Grey Cliffs
- White Cliffs
- Vermilion Cliffs
- Chocolate Cliffs

Since then, modern geologists have further divided Dutton's steps into individual rock formations.

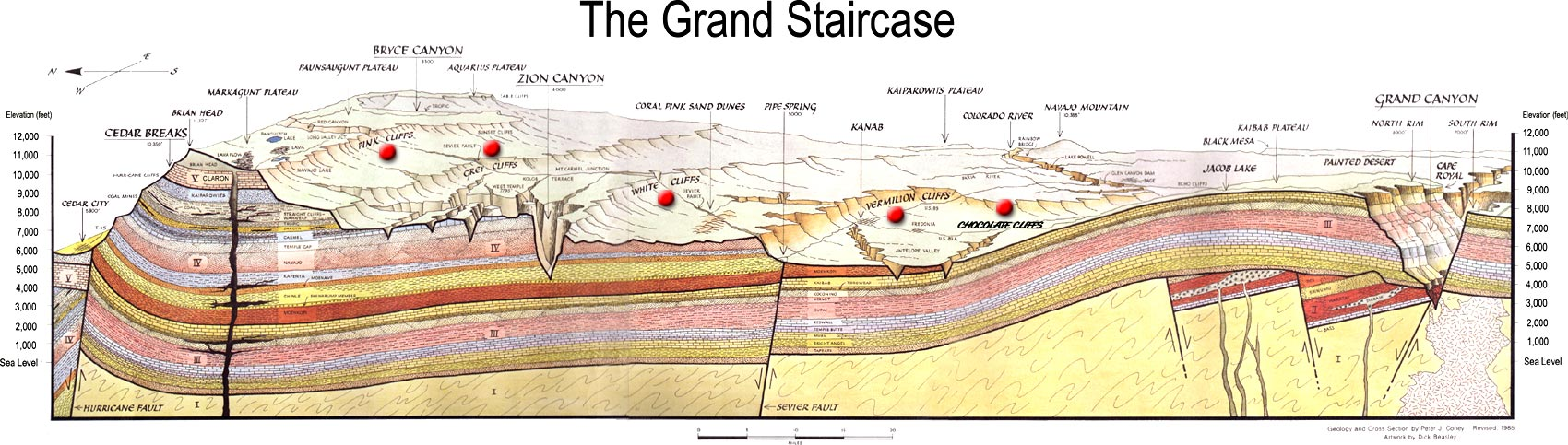
The Grand Staircase. Red dots from left to right: Pink Cliffs, Grey Cliffs, White Cliffs, Vermilion Cliffs, Chocolate Cliffs (NPS image)

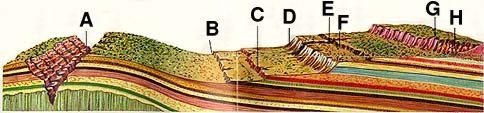
Grand Canyon (A), Chocolate Cliffs (B), Vermilion Cliffs (C), White Cliffs (D), Zion Canyon (E), Gray Cliffs (F), Pink Cliffs (G), Bryce Canyon (H)

Formations in the Grand Staircase starting with the youngest (uppermost) rocks:

- Claron Formation
- Kaiparowits Formation
- Wahweap Formation
- Straight Cliffs Formation
- Tropic Shale
- Dakota Sandstone
- Carmel Formation
- Temple Cap Formation
- Navajo Formation
- Kayenta Formation
- Moenave Formation
- Chinle Formation
- Moenkopi Formation
- Kaibab Limestone
- Toroweap Formation
- Coconino Sandstone
- Hermit Shale
- Supai Group
- Surprise Canyon Formation
- Redwall Limestone
- Temple Butte Limestone
- Muav Limestone
- Bright Angel Shale
- Tapeats Sandstone

== Geology ==
The major sedimentary rock units exposed in the Grand Canyon range in age from 200 million to 600 million years and were deposited in warm shallow seas and near-shore environments. The nearly 40 identified rock layers of Grand Canyon form one of the most studied geologic columns in the world.

The oldest exposed formation in Zion National Park is the youngest exposed formation in the Grand Canyon – the ~240‑million-year-old Kaibab Limestone. The Bryce Canyon area to the northeast continues where the Zion area leaves off by presenting Cenozoic-aged rocks that are 100 million years younger. In fact, the youngest formation seen in the Zion area is the oldest exposed formation in Bryce Canyon – the Dakota Sandstone. There are, however, shared rock units between all three, creating a super-sequence of formations that geologists call the Grand Staircase. Bryce Canyon's formations are the youngest known units in the Grand Staircase. Younger rock units, if they ever existed, have been removed by erosion.

These layers have undergone 5000 to 10,000 feet (1500 to 3000 m) of uplift, starting about 66 million years ago with the Laramide orogeny, which has increased the ability of the Colorado River to cut its channel to make individual plateaus out of the Colorado Plateaus region. The major canyons of the region did not start to form until about five to six million years ago, when the Gulf of California opened up and thus lowered the river's base level (its lowest point).

== Paleontology ==
In the 1880s, many large dinosaur skeletons were excavated from southern Utah in regions north of the Grand Staircase. Following these discoveries, there was little interest in further exploration. In the late 20th and early 21st centuries, there has been greatly renewed interests in the strata of the Grand Staircase, particularly since the exposure and collection of new fossils in previously unexplored strata has a high probability of revealing fossil remnants of hitherto unseen species.

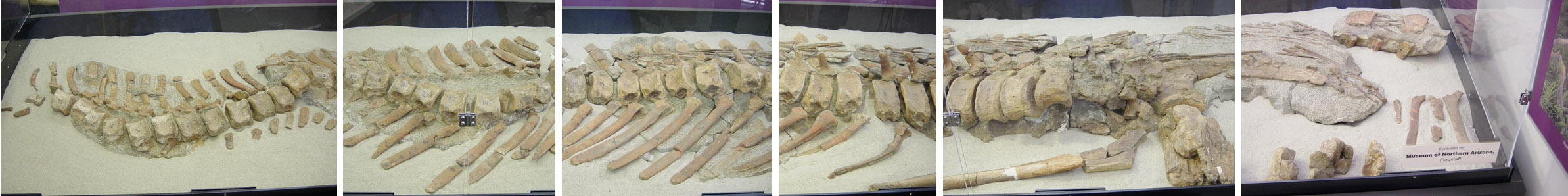
Fossilized skeleton (partial) of a young hadrosaur displayed at the Grand Staircase–Escalante National Monument Click image for display placard text

Southern Utah has continued to reward researchers owing to its climatological "sweet spot" for exposing fossil remnants for observation and collection at the surface. At locations south, in Arizona, the climate is so dry that erosion is relatively slow. Further north, the wetter climates encourage growth of forests, which destroy fossils by the actions of roots and soil bacteria. In southern Utah, there are enough strong and wet storms to cause episodic rapid erosion and the consequent exposure of fossil remains, but with insufficient annual average rainfall to support destructive, deep-rooted plant life.

== Gallery ==
(South to north, climbing the staircase)

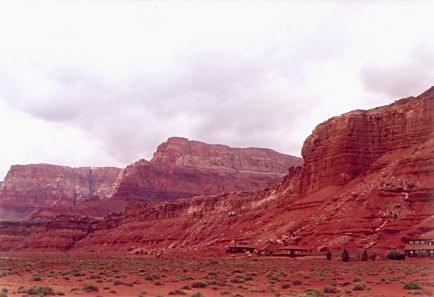
Vermilion Cliffs

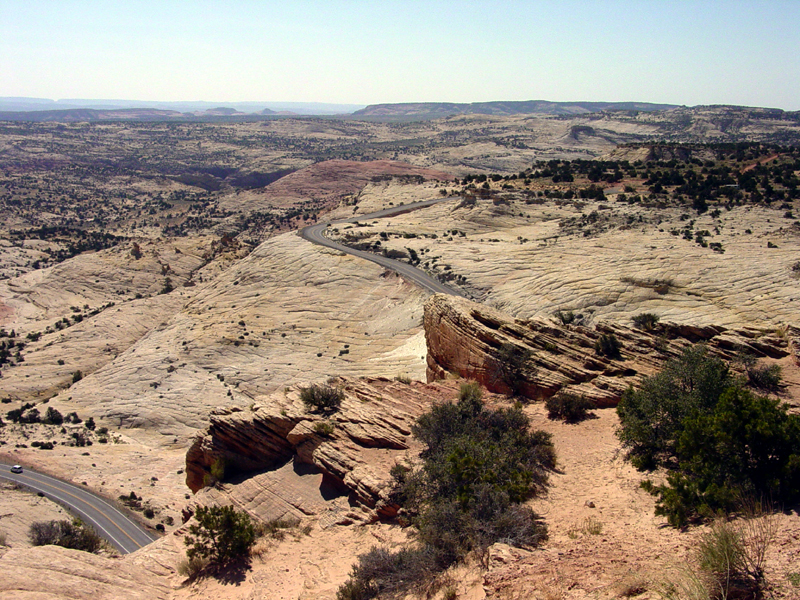
White Cliffs

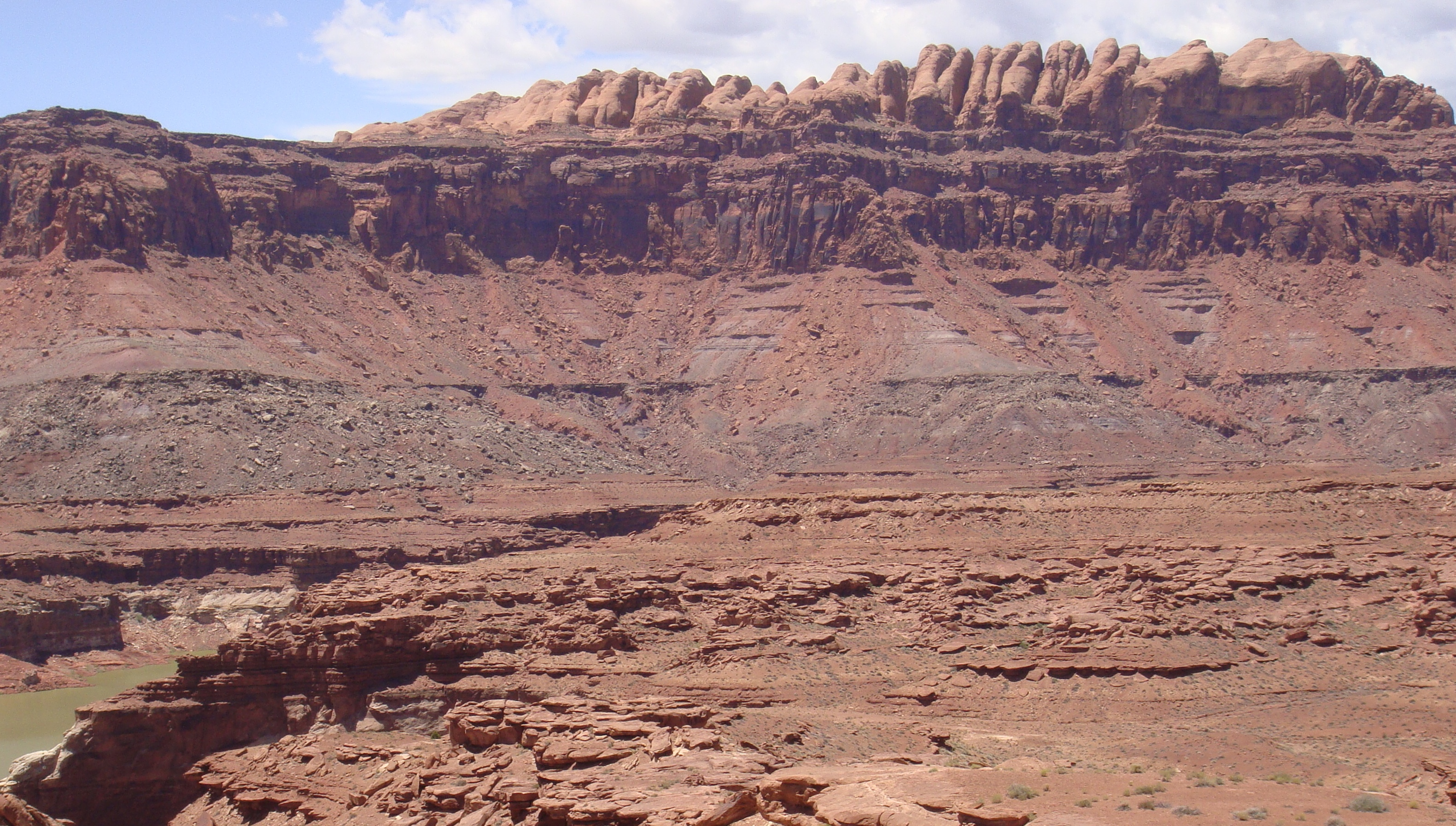
The Permian through Jurassic part of the staircase, as seen at Glen Canyon NRA

== See also ==
- Grand Staircase–Escalante National Monument
