= Geology of the Bryce Canyon area =

Geology of the area in Utah

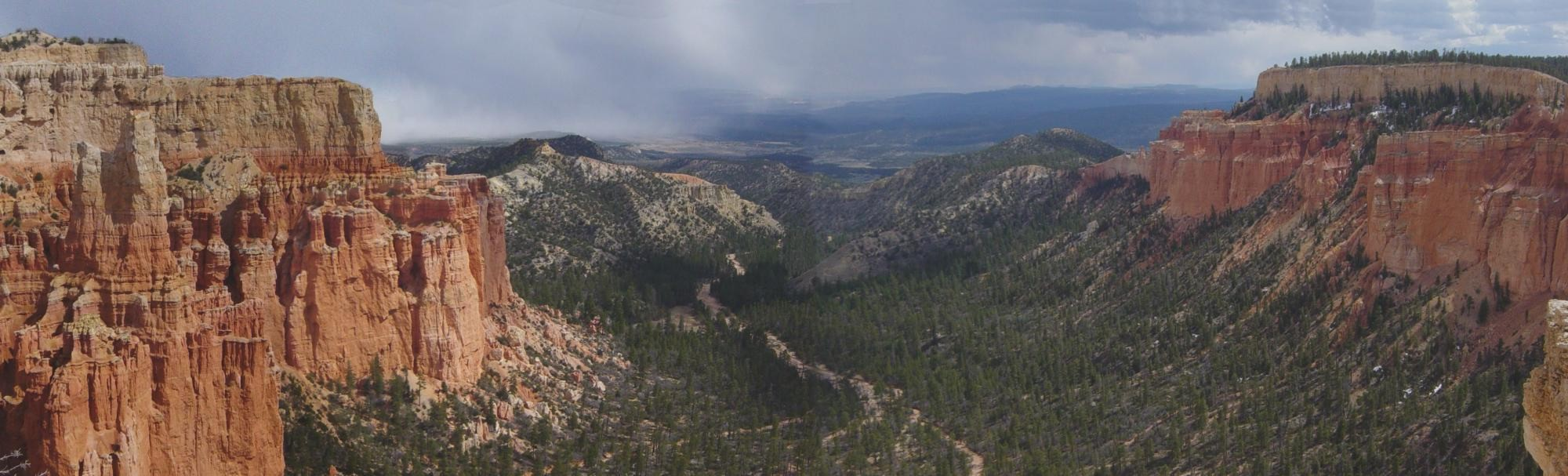
Paria View overlooks an intermittent stream flowing toward the Paria River, some 8 miles (13 km) to the east. About 2 miles (3 km) away is the Paunsaugunt Fault; a normal fault along which the Paria River valley is subsiding on one side while the Paunsaugunt Plateau rises on the other. The pink-colored cliffs, alcoves and amphitheaters along the eroding eastern face of the plateau expose the approximately 50-million-year-old Claron Formation.

The exposed geology of the Bryce Canyon area in Utah shows a record of deposition that covers the last part of the Cretaceous Period and the first half of the Cenozoic era in that part of North America. The ancient depositional environment of the region around what is now Bryce Canyon National Park varied from the warm shallow sea (called the Cretaceous Seaway) in which the Dakota Sandstone and the Tropic Shale were deposited to the cool streams and lakes that contributed sediment to the colorful Claron Formation that dominates the park's amphitheaters.

Other formations were also formed but were mostly eroded following uplift from the Laramide orogeny which started around 70 million years ago (Mya). This event raised the Rocky Mountains far to the east and caused the retreat of the sea that covered the Bryce Canyon area. After Laramide mountain building came to an end, about 15 mya, a large part of western North America began to be stretched into the nearby Basin and Range topography. The greater Bryce area was uplifted as part of the High Plateaus by the same forces. Uplift of the Colorado Plateaus and the opening of the Gulf of California by 5 mya changed the drainage of the Colorado River and its tributaries, including the Paria River, which is eroding headward between two plateaus adjacent to the park. The uplift caused the formation of vertical joints which were later preferentially eroded to form the free-standing pinnacles called hoodoos, badlands, and monoliths we see today.

The formations exposed in the area of the park are part of the Grand Staircase. The oldest members of this super sequence of rock units are exposed in the Grand Canyon, the intermediate ones in Zion National Park, and its youngest parts are laid bare in Bryce Canyon area. A small amount of overlap occurs in and around each park.

== Grand Staircase ==
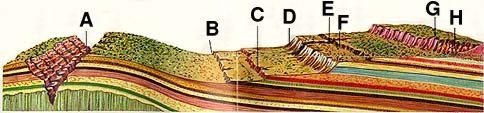
Grand Canyon (A), Chocolate Cliffs (B), Vermilion Cliffs (C), White Cliffs (D), Zion Canyon (E), Gray Cliffs (F), Pink Cliffs (G), Bryce Canyon (H)

The Grand Staircase is a sequence of sedimentary rock layers, first defined in the 1870s, that stretch south for 100 miles (160 km) from Bryce Canyon National Park through Zion National Park and into the Grand Canyon. Bryce Canyon is located within the Pink Cliffs, the highest and youngest rise within the Grand Staircase.

== Cretaceous Seaway ==
=== Advance ===
In the Cretaceous, a shallow seaway spread into the interior of North America from the Gulf of Mexico in the south into Utah and later to the Arctic Ocean in the far north. Geologists call this shallow sea the Cretaceous Seaway or Western Interior Seaway. The seaway divided North America into two halves: an eastern portion dominated by the already ancient Appalachian Mountains and a western part composed primarily of the still growing Sevier Mountains; formed from shallow thrust faulting caused by the Sevier orogeny. As the shoreline moved back and forth, the Bryce area alternated from being part of the Sevier landmass to being under the Cretaceous Seaway. Alternating layers of nonmarine, intertidal, and marine sediments lay on top of each other as a result.

Conglomerate, siltstone, and fossil-rich sandstone that together are up to 300 feet (90 m) thick mark the arrival of the Cretaceous Seaway. Called the Dakota Sandstone, it is the oldest formation exposed in the Bryce Canyon area but the youngest one exposed in the Zion and Kolob canyons area to the southwest. Abundant amounts of petrified wood, oyster beds containing millions of fossils, and coal are all found in the Dakota. In the Bryce Canyon area, this formation can be seen in the Paria Valley where it is found as a lithified blanket sand that probably accumulated on beaches, in lagoons, and vast coal-producing swamps as the Cretaceous Seaway transgressed (advanced inland) over the region and later retreated. It sits unconformably on much older Jurassic formations that are not exposed in the immediate area (see geology of the Zion and Kolob canyons area for a discussion about these older sediments).

Mud and silt were deposited on top of the Dakota Formation as the seaway became deeper and calmer in the area. The resulting dark gray to black Tropic Shale records the maximum transgression of the seaway into Utah and is 1,000 feet (300 m) thick in the Paria Amphitheater. It forms the unvegetated badlands seen in the Tropic Valley and is perhaps the most fossil-rich formation in the area; containing numerous straight-shelled and coiled ammonites.

=== Retreat ===
The Cretaceous Seaway was already retreating east and to the south by the time the locally 1,700 feet (500 m) thick Straight Cliffs Formation was deposited. Its members represent various stages in this process. The cliff-forming sandstone of the Tibbet Canyon Member was conformably deposited on top of the Tropic Shale in shallow marine and later near shore environments. Shale and sandstone from the Smoky Hollow Member were deposited on top of its basal layer of coal-rich mudstone in coastal swamps and lagoons on the shore of the seaway. While the alternating layers of shale and sandstone mixed with massive coal deposits of the John Henry Member were laid down in swamps, lagoons and fluvial environments, one member, the Drip Tank, is not found in the Bryce Canyon area. This formation erodes into almost unclimbable cliffs and escarpments of whitish to yellow-gray sandstones with comparatively thin interbedded layers of shale and mudstone. Shark teeth are found in the lower parts of the formation.

Lakes and east-flowing rivers became the dominant resting place for sediment following the retreat of the Cretaceous Seaway. The shales and sandstones of the locally 700 feet (200 m) thick Wahweap Formation were deposited in moving water (fluvial setting). This formation is part of the Grey Cliffs of the Grand Staircase mentioned previously. It contains abundant fossils of vertebrates, including dinosaurs such as the hadrosaurs.

== Continental deposition ==
=== Flood plains uplift and erode ===
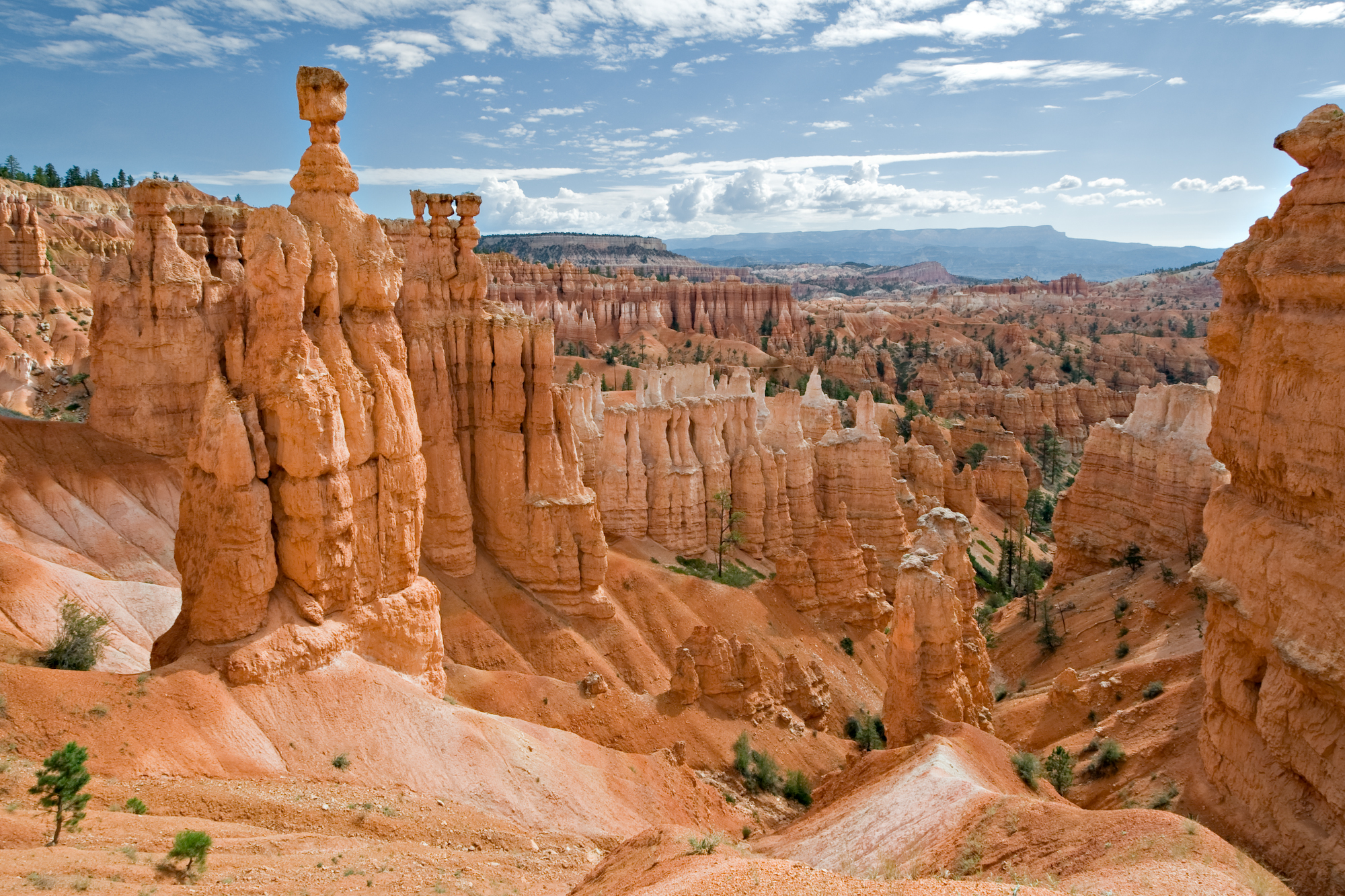
Hoodoos in Claron Formation, Bryce Canyon

A flood plain crossed by rivers and lakes developed in the area. Mud and sand accumulated in this setting to become the gray sandstones and mudstones of the Kaiparowits Formation. This formation is up to 100 feet (30 m) thick in the Bryce Canyon area, but other parts of the Kaiparowits in the region are several hundreds of feet (tens of meters) thick. Two formations, the Canaan Peak and the Pine Hollow, sit on top of the Kaiparowits elsewhere in the region but are absent in the Bryce Canyon area. The sandstones and conglomerates of these formations record stream and river deposition starting in the Paleocene epoch.

Uplift caused by a mountain-building episode called the Laramide orogeny lasted from the late Cretaceous around 70 mya to the early Paleocene. This hoisted the once lower uplands skyward while low-lying basins between them gradually subsided. Compression from the Laramide event deformed the land in the area to form the up to 5° dipping Bryce Canyon Anticline. All of the Canaan Peak, Pine Hollow, Kaiparowits, and Waheap formations, along with part of the underlying Straight Cliffs, were removed from the anticline's crest by erosion before the Claron Formation was deposited. An angular unconformity therefore exists along the anticline's crest. The park also sits on the western gently dipping flank of the much larger Kaibab uplift, which was also formed as a result of the Laramide.

=== Claron flood plain and lake system ===
Uplift from the Laramide paused briefly in the Eocene. Meandering streams flowed slowly over the resulting broad and almost featureless plains. Periodic but extensive floods inundated large areas perhaps once every 1,000 years; spreading mud, cobbles and fine silt over the plains. Erosion incised these deposits between flood events and plant growth was abundant. Oxidation of the iron in the mud and silt turned the soil into hematite, giving it a pink and red hue. These sediments were later lithified into the up-to- 700 feet (200 m)-thick Pink Member of the locally Eocene-aged Claron Formation (previously called the Wasatch Formation). Channelized conglomerates of this member can be easily seen in Red Canyon along State Route 12 while its silt and mudstones compose most of the park's fragile and colorful spires called hoodoos. Geologist Clarence Dutton called the iron oxide-rich lower member of the Claron the Pink Cliffs series due to its colorful appearance.

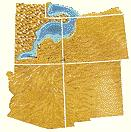
Claron lake system

A large system of shallow but expansive lakes and associated deltas covered several thousand square miles of what is now northwest Colorado and southwest Utah and Wyoming. These lakes existed from the Paleocene to mid Oligocene but did not spread to the Bryce Canyon area until Eocene time. Large quantities of lakebed sediments were laid down in this system during the 20 million years of its existence from about 60 to 40 mya. Climate change and cycles caused the lakes in the system to expand and shrink through time. As they did so, they left beds of differing thickness and composition stacked atop one another;

- various sand and cobble deposits near shore,
- calcium-poor muds further from shore,
- calcium-rich mud in deeper water, and
- pure limey oozes were deposited in the deepest waters.

The limey oozes and mud were later lithified into the limestone and interbedded siltstone of the up-to-300 foot (90 m)-thick White Member of the Claron. This member erodes into white-colored monoliths that are found only at the highest elevations of the Paunsaugunt Plateau. Fossils are rare in the White Member and consist mainly of freshwater snails and clams, indicating that the lakes supported little life. Most arches and natural bridges in the park, including the famous Natural Bridge, were carved from sandstone beds in the Claron.

=== Marysvale volcanics ===
A gap in the geologic record following deposition of the Claron Formation was interrupted 34 to 31 mya by eruptions from the nearby Marysvale volcanic field, which is located northwest of the park. Volcanic ash and lava from these flows are found less than 20 miles (30 km) from Bryce Canyon but at least some volcanic material was likely deposited directly in the park area only to be later removed by erosion.

Most of the activity at the Marysvale volcanic field occurred during three separate intervals; ~34–22 mya, 22–14 mya and 9–5 mya. Dacites and andesites were erupted above an evolving batholith in the first interval. Crystal-rich ash from the 27-million-year-old (myo) Three Creeks caldera, 24 myo Big John caldera and 23 myo Monroe Peak caldera hardened into tuff. The second and third intervals saw eruptions of great quantities of rhyolites. Alkali-rich rhyolite erupted in the second interval from the 19 myo Mount Belknap caldera.

The Marysvale volcanic field collapsed under its own weight around 20 mya; likely due to weaknesses in the evaporites of the Carmel Formation some 5,000 feet (2,000 m) below. Folding and faulting of the Claron Formation from the collapse created Ruby's Inn thrust. A slight downwarp running east–west and perpendicular to the thrust motion called the Bryce syncline was also created. Volcanic activity in the Marysvale and Bryce area ceased some 500,000 years ago. Basaltic rocks of the same age can be seen along the Sevier Fault near the entrance to Red Canyon; the dark colored volcanic rocks have been displaced by the fault some 900 feet (300 m) and are now in direct contact with the much older Claron Formation.

== Late Cenozoic tectonics ==
=== Formation of the High Plateaus ===
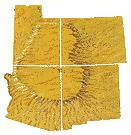
Colorado Plateau index map

Younger rock units were laid down but were mostly removed by subsequent uplift-accelerated erosion. Outcrops of these formations can be found in the northern part of the park and in a few places on the plateau rim. Among these are the 50-to-100-foot (20 to 30 m) thick Oligocene or Miocene-aged Boat Mesa Conglomerate and the Pliocene to early Pleistocene-aged Sevier River Formation. The Boat Mesa is made mostly of conglomerates with minor amounts of sandstone and some limestone from lakes, representing stream and overbank flood deposits. The brownish-gray sandstone and gravels of the Sevier River Formation were laid down in valleys that were part of the ancestral Sevier River drainage system.

Around 15 mya in Miocene time, tensional forces in Nevada to the west were so great that the crust was spread thin, creating the Basin and Range Province. These same forces segmented what is now the western part of the Colorado Plateau into nine different smaller plateaus, including the Paunsaugunt that the park sits astride. Long, north–south-trending normal faults were either newly created or reactivated from older pre-existing faults; a plateau rose on one side of each fault while valleys subsided on the other as the crust was extended in an east–west direction. Two of these faults bound the Paunsaugunt Plateau; the Sevier on the west and the Paunsaugunt on the east. Movement along these two faults has displaced the Claron Formation by 2,000 feet (600 m) relative to the Paria and Sevier valleys.

The Hurricane Fault marks the west edge of the Markagunt Plateau and is the topographic boundary between the Basin and Range and the Colorado Plateaus provinces. Cedar Breaks National Monument, which shares almost the same exposed geology and erosional features as Bryce Canyon National Park, sits on the west edge of the Markagunt.

The entire Colorado Plateau then started to uplift from near sea level to several thousand feet (over a kilometer) in elevation. An alternate theory is that the Laramide orogeny uplifted what is today the Basin and Range and the Colorado Plateau and that the tensional forces that formed the Basin and Range caused that region to subside relative to the Colorado Plateau. Whatever the order of events were, the High Plateaus region of the Colorado Plateau were by now nearly complete.

=== Modern drainage and erosion ===
Drainage of the Colorado Plateau was significantly altered by the opening of the Gulf of California. Rifting tore Baja California Peninsula northwestward from the Mexican mainland starting some 10 to 5 mya. The ancestral Colorado River responded to the regional downwarping by taking a shortcut to the sea by flowing into the new gulf. This significantly decreased the distance from the river's headwaters and its delta at the sea. Water in the Colorado and its tributaries moved faster as a result and cut down deeper, creating the canyonland topography.

Formation of approximately the current depth of the Colorado River's Grand Canyon by 1.2 mya further caused its tributaries to cut down even deeper. Headward erosion of one of those tributaries, the Paria River, eroded north-northwestward toward what is now Paria Amphitheater. The river took a route roughly parallel to and east of the Paunsaugunt Fault. Erosion from snow and rain that fall directly on the east-facing rim of the Paunsaugunt Plateau forms gullies that widen into alcoves and amphitheaters while differential erosion and frost wedging create the hoodoos. Streams on the plateau do not contribute to the formation of alcoves or amphitheaters because they flow away from the rim. Erosion continues in this fashion today.

== Hoodoo formation in Bryce Canyon ==
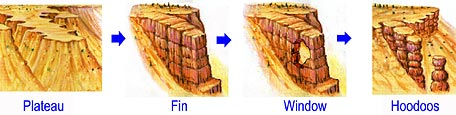
Hoodoo formation

The Pink Member of the Claron Formation is largely composed of easily eroded and relatively soft limestone. When rain combines with carbon dioxide it forms a weak solution of carbonic acid. This acid helps to slowly dissolve the limestone in the Claron Formation grain by grain. It is this process of chemical weathering that rounds the edges of hoodoos and gives them their lumpy and bulging profiles.

In the winter, melting snow seeps into cracks and joints and freezes at night. The force of the expanding ice helps to erode the rock of the Claron Formation. Over 200 of these freeze/thaw cycles occur each year in Bryce Canyon. Frost wedging exploits and widens the nearly vertical joint planes that divide the Pink Member of the Claron Formation.

Internal layers of mudstone, conglomerate and siltstone interrupt the limestone horizontally. These layers are more resistant to attack by carbonic acid and they can therefore act as protective capstones of fins, windows and hoodoos. Many of the more durable hoodoos are capped with a type of magnesium-rich limestone called dolomite. Dolomite dissolves at a much slower rate, and consequently protects the weaker limestone underneath.

However, the same processes that create hoodoos will also eventually destroy them. In the case of Bryce Canyon, the hoodoos' rate of erosion is 2–4 feet (0.6–1.3 m) every 100 years. As the canyon continues to erode to the west it will eventually capture (in perhaps 3 million years) the watershed of the East Fork of the Sevier River. Once this river flows through Bryce Amphitheater it will dominate the erosional pattern; replacing hoodoos with a V-shaped canyon and steep cliff walls typical of the weathering and erosional patterns created by rivers. A foreshadowing of this can be observed in Water Canyon while hiking the Mossy Cave Trail. A diversion canal called the Tropic Ditch has been taking some or all of water from the East Fork of the Sevier River through this section of the park for over 100 years.
