= Pink Cliffs =

Cliffs in Utah, United States

Coordinates: 37°31′N 112°15.7′W

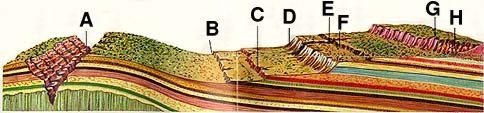
The Grand Staircase: (A) Grand Canyon, (B) Chocolate Cliffs, (C) Vermilion Cliffs, (D) White Cliffs, (E) Zion Canyon, (F) Gray Cliffs, (G) Pink Cliffs, and (H) Bryce Canyon

The Pink Cliffs are a series of highly dissected cliffs on the Colorado Plateau in Garfield, Iron, and Kane counties in southwestern Utah, United States. Contrary to the implication of the name, the cliffs are not a single set of rock formations, but actually a geological formation that manifests itself in multiple sets of rock formations.

== Description ==
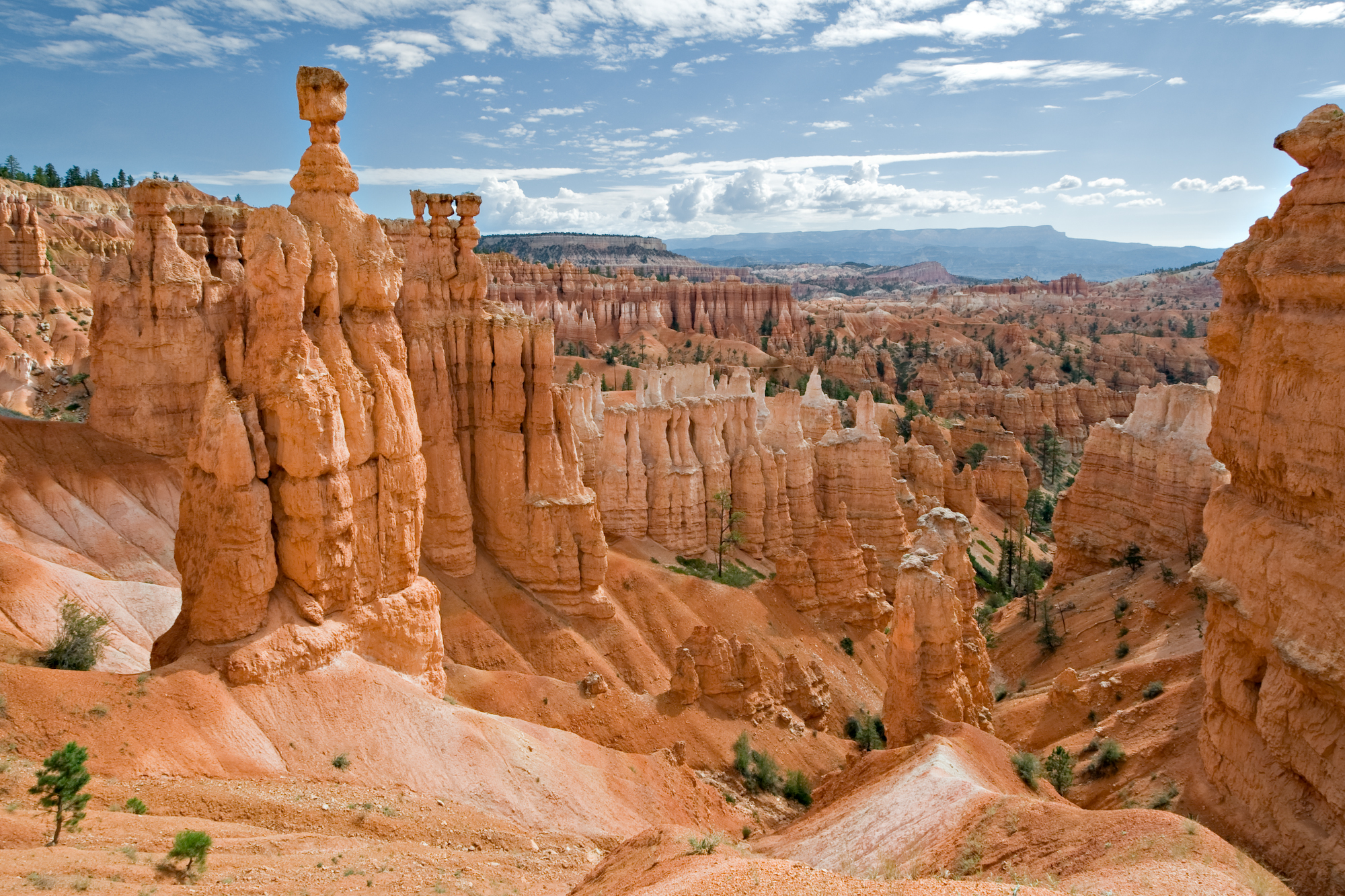
One of the many hoodoo formations in the section of the Pink Cliffs that are located within Bryce Canyon National Park, July 2007

The cliffs form a large number of unique rock formations, many of which are protected by either the Bryce Canyon National Park or the Cedar Breaks National Monument. Most of the other formations are located within the Dixie National Forest. Geologically the cliffs are pink- and red-colored Claron Formation limestones, forming the upper riser of the Grand Staircase (which descends southward to the Grand Canyon in Arizona). The Pink Cliffs, as well as the other layers of the Grand Staircase, were named by geologist Clarence Dutton in the 1870s.

While it is not an uncommon belief that the extent of the Pink Cliff is limited to the Bryce Canyon National Park area (being one of the best and most popular areas to view the cliffs), geographically, the cliffs actually extend well beyond the national park, forming a rough, but wide, "U" shape that spans three counties. The westernmost part of the cliffs are located on the western edge of the Markagunt Plateau (mostly within Cedar Breaks National Monument) in southeastern Iron County and the easternmost part of the cliffs are located on the southeastern edge of the Paunsaugunt Plateau in southwestern Garfield County (mostly within Bryce Canyon National Park). From the national monument on the west, the cliffs wrap south around the southern edge of the Markagunt Plateau (roughly along the border of the Dixie National Forest) and run just south of Navajo Lake in northeastern Kane County. After being bisected by the Long Valley and the valley of Kanab Creek, the cliffs wrap around the southern and southeastern edges of the Paunsaugunt Plateau and extend north through and just beyond the national park.

== See also ==
- Sandstone formations of the United States (category)
- Vermilion Cliffs
