= Paunsaugunt Plateau =

Plateau in Utah, USA

Coordinates: 37°30′00″N 112°23′04″W

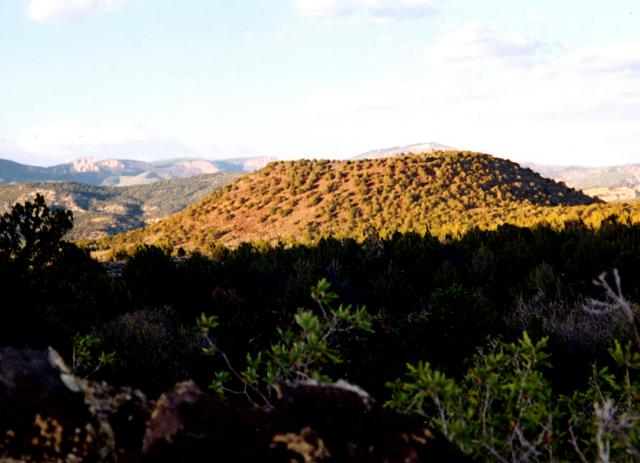
Bald Knoll is the youngest of a group of cinder cones on the SW part of the Paunsaugunt Plateau in southern Utah.

The Paunsaugunt Plateau (/ˈpɔːnsəˌɡænt/ PAWN-sə-gant) is a dissected plateau, rising to an elevation of 7,000–9,300 feet (2,100–2,800 m), in southwestern Utah in the United States. Located in northern Kane County and southwestern Garfield County, it is roughly 10 miles (16 km) wide, and extends southward from the Sevier Plateau about 25 miles (40 km), terminating in the Pink Cliffs at the southern end.

It is drained by the East Fork Sevier River which flows northward on the plateau, to the meet the main branch (Sevier River) which flows in a valley along the western side of the plateau. The plateau is highly dissected along the eastern flank, which is drained by the Paria River in the Colorado River watershed, and is protected as Bryce Canyon National Park. A section of the Great Basin Divide is along the plateau, and much of the plateau is part of Dixie National Forest. The plateau receives approximately 200 inches (5,100 mm) of snow per year and experiences approximately 200 days of freeze-and-thaw cycles. Utah's Highway 12, an All-American Road, crosses the Paunsaugunt Plateau.

Geologically the plateau was created approximately 10–20 million years ago by an uplift on the larger Colorado Plateau. The uplifting caused the formation of joints along the side of the plateau. Subsequent erosive forces, especially along the eastern side in Bryce Canyon National Park, have resulted in the creation of strange rock formations called hoodoos which are the hallmark of the park.

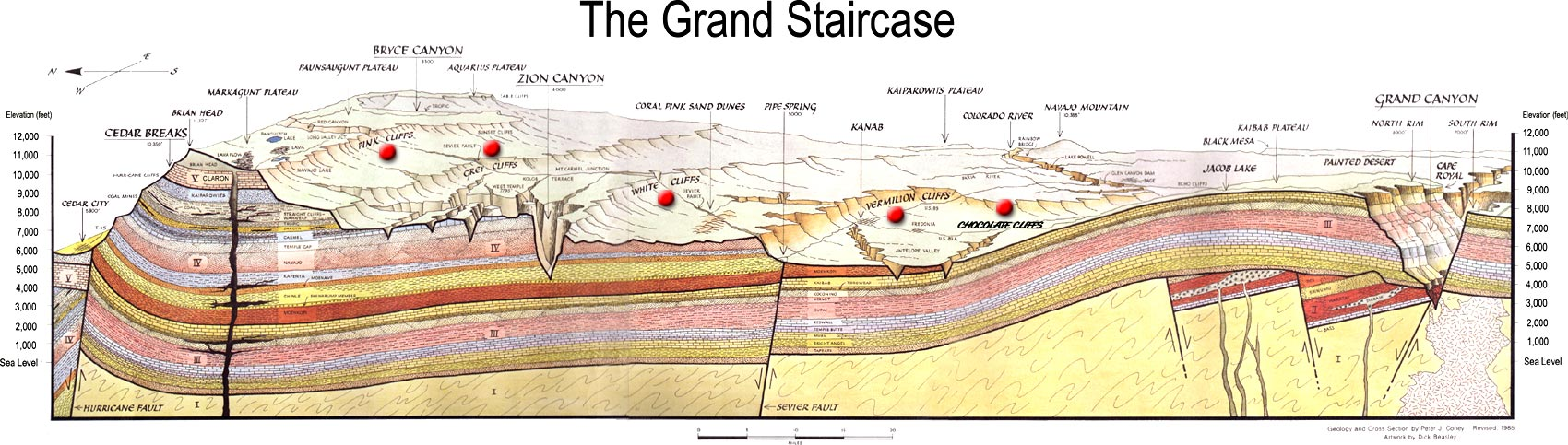
A diagram of the plateau

== See also ==
- Geology of the Bryce Canyon area
