= Aloba Arch =

Natural arch in the Ennedi Plateau, Chad

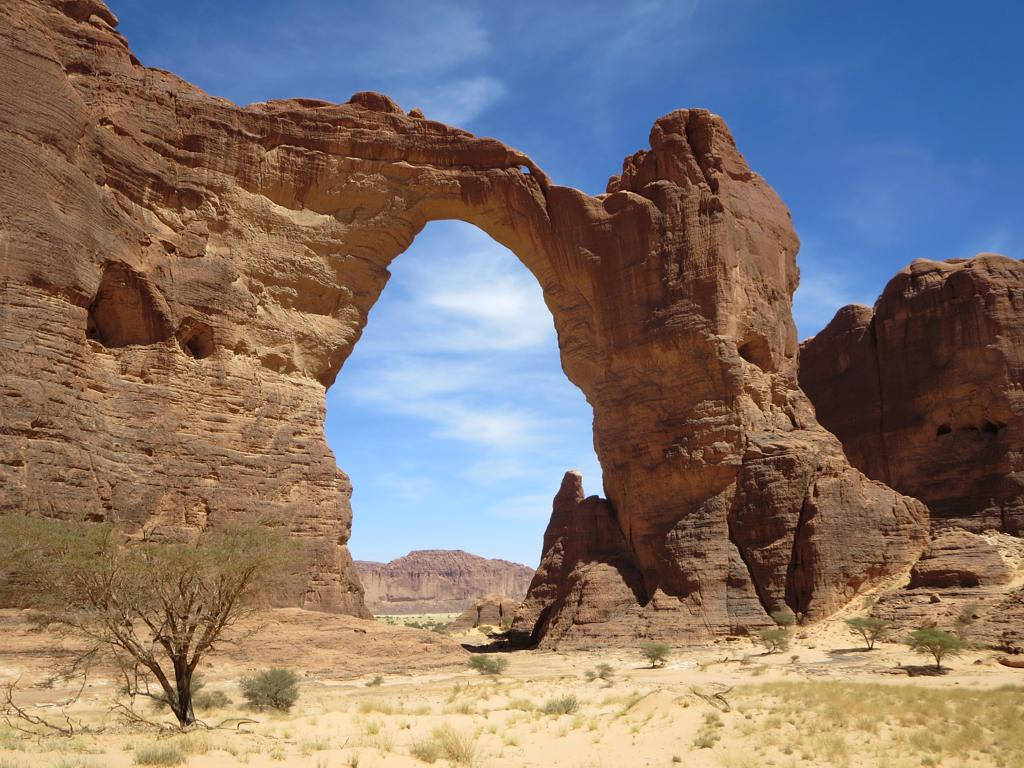
- View of Aloba Arch

- Location within Chad
- Location: Ennedi Plateau, Chad
- Nearest town: Fada
- Coordinates: 16°44′29″N 22°14′21″E
- Length: 250 ft (76 m)
- Width: 77 ft (23 m)
- Elevation: 394 ft (120 m)

Aloba Arch is a natural arch located in Chad. Large natural arches are somewhat rare outside the southern and western regions of China and the Colorado Plateau of the southwest United States. Chad's Ennedi Plateau, located within the Sahara Desert in the northeast part of the country, has a geology similar to the Colorado Plateau and has produced a number of natural arches and similar landforms, although only Aloba can claim to be on the top ten list of longest arches in the world.

Aloba Arch's span is considered to be the 8th longest known natural arch, and the longest outside of China and Utah. Due in part to its location as well as being only recently recognized for its size, estimates based on photography yield an approximate span of 250 ft (76.2 m). Xianren Bridge (Fairy Bridge) in China has a span of 400 ft (121.9 m) which is the longest discovered and measured span to date. Perhaps more notable than the span, however, is the height of the arch. At 394 ft (120.1 m) tall, it towers over the more famous Rainbow Bridge and is one of the tallest known arches in the world.
