= Alton, Utah =

Town in the state of Utah, United States

- Town
- Location in Kane County and the state of Utah

- Location of Utah in the United States
- Coordinates: 37°26′16″N 112°28′58″W
- Country: United States
- State: Utah
- County: Kane
- Founded: 1907
- Incorporated: 1935
- Named for: Alton Fjord

Area
  - Total: 2.32 sq mi (6.02 km^{2})
  - Land: 2.29 sq mi (5.93 km^{2})
  - Water: 0.039 sq mi (0.10 km^{2})
- Elevation: 7,041 ft (2,146 m)

Population (2020)
  - Total: 118
  - Density: 52.4/sq mi (20.25/km^{2})
- Time zone: UTC-7 (MST)
  - Summer (DST): UTC-6 (MDT)
- ZIP code: 84710
- Area code: 435
- FIPS code: 49-00870
- GNIS feature ID: 1438182

Alton is a town in northwest Kane County, Utah, United States. The population was 118 at the 2020 census, a decrease from the 2010 figure of 119.

== History ==
Alton was first settled by Lorenzo Wesley Roundy in 1865 and was originally called "Roundys Station". Roundy's family was forced to leave due to conflicts with the local indigenous tribes. The community was later called "Graham", after Graham Duncan McDonald, a local pioneer. Over the years, many names have been discussed, but a consensus could not be reached. In 1912, a drawing was held at a community event to determine the community's name. Charles R. Pugh, who had been reading about the Alton Fjord in Norway, suggested the name, and it was pulled from the hat by a two-year-old child.

Dustin Cox currently serves as Alton's Mayor and has been in the position for some time. He will likely run unopposed in the town's next election.

== Demographics ==
Historical population
Census	Pop.	Note	%±
1900	106		—
1910	98		−7.5%
1920	169		72.4%
1930	193		14.2%
1940	239		23.8%
1950	154		−35.6%
1960	116		−24.7%
1970	62		−46.6%
1980	75		21.0%
1990	93		24.0%
2000	134		44.1%
2010	119		−11.2%
2020	118		−0.8%
U.S. Decennial Census

As of the census of 2010, there were 119 people in 39 households in the town. The racial makeup of the town was 89% white, 5% Hispanic or Latino, and 2.5% Native American.

The population was 45 percent male and 55 percent female. The population was 38.7 percent under 18 and 20 percent 65 or over.

== Geography ==
Alton is in northwestern Kane County, in a sloping valley known as the "Alton Amphitheater", 4 miles (6 km) east of U.S. Route 89 along Utah State Route 136. Kanab Creek flows past the east side of the community.

According to the United States Census Bureau, the town has a total area of 2.1 square miles (5.5 km^{2}), of which 0.04 square miles (0.1 km^{2}), or 1.74%, are water.

=== Climate ===
Alton has a warm-summer continental climate (Köppen Dsb).

Climate data for Alton, Utah, 1991–2020 normals, extremes 1915–present
Month	Jan	Feb	Mar	Apr	May	Jun	Jul	Aug	Sep	Oct	Nov	Dec	Year
Record high °F (°C)	64 (18)	68 (20)	76 (24)	81 (27)	90 (32)	96 (36)	101 (38)	97 (36)	93 (34)	85 (29)	77 (25)	67 (19)	101 (38)
Mean daily maximum °F (°C)	41.3 (5.2)	43.4 (6.3)	51.5 (10.8)	60.0 (15.6)	69.4 (20.8)	80.5 (26.9)	85.3 (29.6)	83.1 (28.4)	75.9 (24.4)	64.1 (17.8)	51.2 (10.7)	41.0 (5.0)	62.2 (16.8)
Daily mean °F (°C)	29.6 (−1.3)	31.4 (−0.3)	38.0 (3.3)	44.5 (6.9)	52.3 (11.3)	61.7 (16.5)	68.2 (20.1)	66.6 (19.2)	59.4 (15.2)	48.8 (9.3)	37.7 (3.2)	29.4 (−1.4)	47.3 (8.5)
Mean daily minimum °F (°C)	17.9 (−7.8)	19.4 (−7.0)	24.4 (−4.2)	29.0 (−1.7)	35.2 (1.8)	43.0 (6.1)	51.2 (10.7)	50.1 (10.1)	42.9 (6.1)	33.5 (0.8)	24.3 (−4.3)	17.8 (−7.9)	32.4 (0.2)
Record low °F (°C)	−20 (−29)	−17 (−27)	−7 (−22)	−2 (−19)	5 (−15)	23 (−5)	32 (0)	32 (0)	20 (−7)	−2 (−19)	−5 (−21)	−24 (−31)	−24 (−31)
Average precipitation inches (mm)	2.03 (52)	2.07 (53)	1.51 (38)	0.82 (21)	0.87 (22)	0.41 (10)	1.17 (30)	1.87 (47)	1.70 (43)	1.80 (46)	1.22 (31)	1.83 (46)	17.30 (439)
Average snowfall inches (cm)	17.8 (45)	18.7 (47)	12.6 (32)	5.2 (13)	0.3 (0.76)	0.4 (1.0)	0.0 (0.0)	0.0 (0.0)	0.0 (0.0)	2.0 (5.1)	6.4 (16)	14.1 (36)	77.5 (197)
Average precipitation days (≥ 0.01 in)	6.4	7.0	5.8	4.8	4.6	2.3	6.5	7.8	6.2	4.9	3.8	5.9	66.0
Average snowy days (≥ 0.1 in)	5.2	5.3	3.5	2.2	0.4	0.1	0.0	0.0	0.0	0.9	2.0	4.3	23.9
Source: NOAA

== See also ==
- List of municipalities in Utah
