= Kane County, Utah =

County in Utah, United States

- County
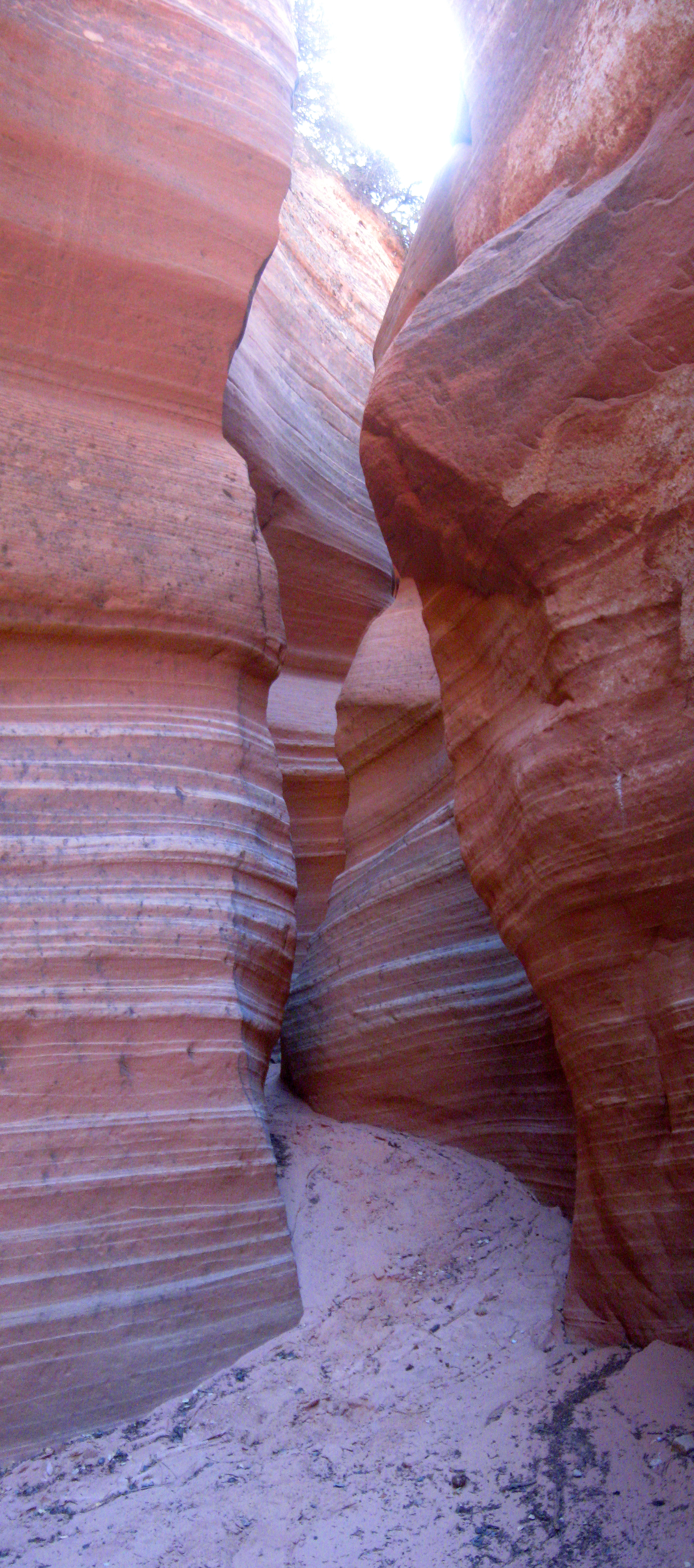
- Narrows in Diana's Throne Canyon, also known as the Huntress Slot in vicinity of Mount Carmel Junction.

- Location within the U.S. state of Utah
- Coordinates: 37°17′N 111°53′W
- Country: United States
- State: Utah
- Founded: January 16, 1864
- Named for: Thomas L. Kane
- Seat: Kanab
- Largest city: Kanab

Area
  - Total: 4,109 sq mi (10,640 km^{2})
  - Land: 3,990 sq mi (10,300 km^{2})
  - Water: 118 sq mi (310 km^{2}) 2.9%

Population (2020)
  - Total: 7,667
  - Estimate (2025): 8,597 ▲
  - Density: 1.92/sq mi (0.742/km^{2})
- Time zone: UTC−7 (Mountain)
  - Summer (DST): UTC−6 (MDT)
- Congressional district: 2nd
- Website: kane.utah.gov

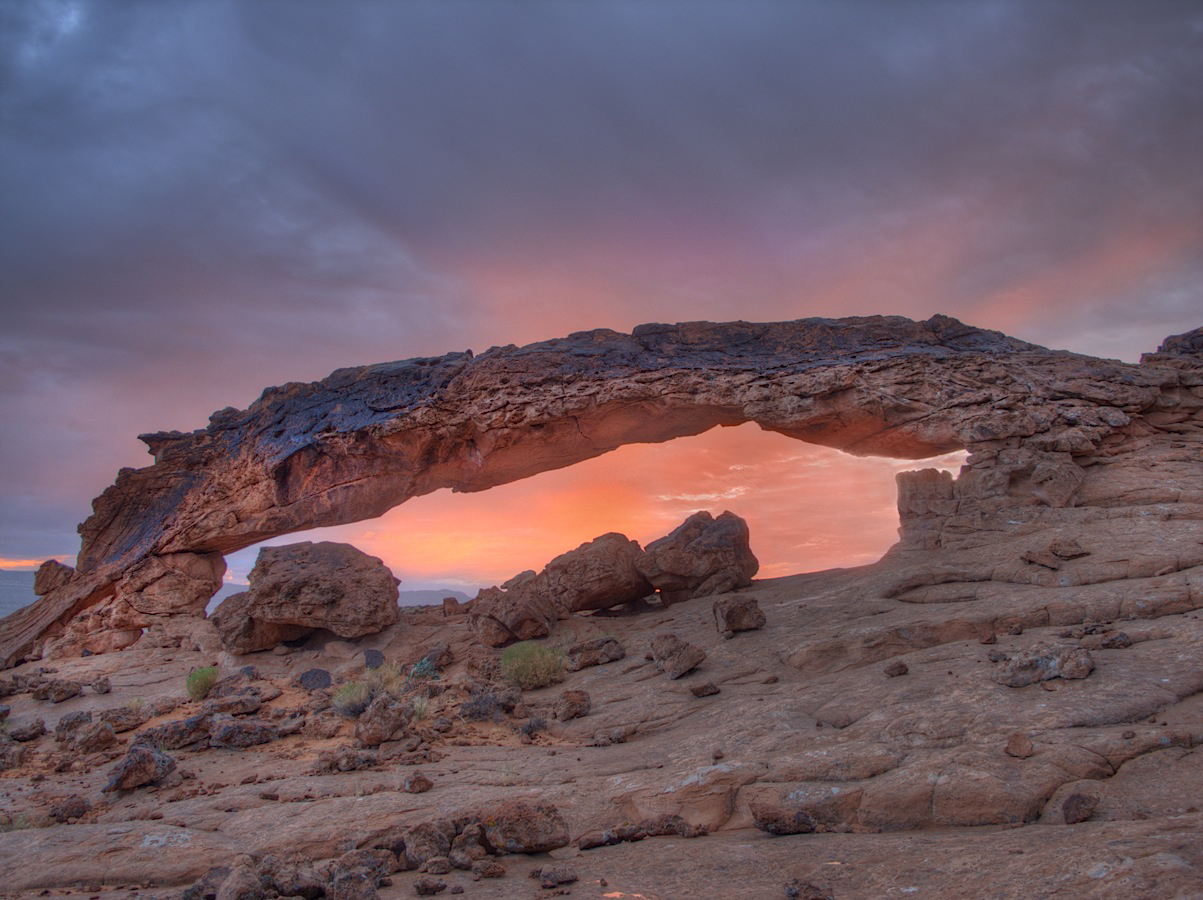
Sunset Arch, Glen Canyon National Recreation Area

Kane County is a county in the U.S. state of Utah. As of the 2020 United States census, the population was 7,667. Its county seat and largest city is Kanab.

== History ==
The county was created on January 16, 1864, by the old federal Utah Territory (1850–1896) territorial legislature, with areas partitioned off from earlier Washington County. It was named for Col. Thomas L. Kane (1822–1883), a friend of the Latter Day Saint (Mormons) settlers when they first arrived westward, led by patriarch Brigham Young (1801–1877), in the 1840s and 1850s. The county boundary was readjusted later, first in 1869, when a portion was returned back to Washington County; second in 1880, when San Juan County was partitioned off and created; and third, in 1883, when additional portions were partitioned from Kane and added to Iron and back to Washington counties. The latter of those partitions resulted the transfer of county seat from Toquerville to Kanab.

== Geography ==
Kane County lies on the south line of the state of Utah. Its south border abuts the northern border of the state of Arizona. The Colorado River, reformed as Lake Powell, forms its eastern border. Grand Staircase–Escalante National Monument covers much of the county. A rugged and inhospitable country of deserts, mountains, and cliffs make up the terrain, with breathtaking scenery in every area. Parts of Bryce Canyon National Park and Zion National Park extend into the northern and western portions of the county. The eastern part of the county is part of the Glen Canyon National Recreation Area. The county has a total area of 4,109 square miles (10,640 km^{2}), of which 3,990 square miles (10,300 km^{2}) is land and 118 square miles (310 km^{2}) (2.9%) is water.

=== Adjacent counties ===
- Washington County – west
- Iron County – northwest
- Garfield County – north
- San Juan County – east
- Mohave County, Arizona – southwest
- Coconino County, Arizona – south

=== Protected areas ===
- Bryce Canyon National Park (part)
- Coral Pink Sand Dunes State Park
- Dixie National Forest (part)
- Glen Canyon National Recreation Area (part)
- Grand Staircase–Escalante National Monument (part)
- Kodachrome Basin State Park
- Zion National Park (part)

=== Lakes ===
- Lake Powell (along east border)
- Navajo Lake

== Demographics ==
Historical population
| Census | Pop. | Note | %± |
|---|---|---|---|
| 1870 | 1,513 | | — |
| 1880 | 3,085 | | 103.9% |
| 1890 | 1,685 | | −45.4% |
| 1900 | 1,811 | | 7.5% |
| 1910 | 1,652 | | −8.8% |
| 1920 | 2,054 | | 24.3% |
| 1930 | 2,235 | | 8.8% |
| 1940 | 2,561 | | 14.6% |
| 1950 | 2,299 | | −10.2% |
| 1960 | 2,667 | | 16.0% |
| 1970 | 2,421 | | −9.2% |
| 1980 | 4,024 | | 66.2% |
| 1990 | 5,169 | | 28.5% |
| 2000 | 6,046 | | 17.0% |
| 2010 | 7,125 | | 17.8% |
| 2020 | 7,667 | | 7.6% |
| 2025 (est.) | 8,597 | ▲ | 12.1% |
US Decennial Census; 1790–1960 1900–1990; 1990–2000 2010 2020

=== Racial and ethnic composition ===
Kane County, Utah – Racial and ethnic composition Note: the US Census treats Hispanic/Latino as an ethnic category. This table excludes Latinos from the racial categories and assigns them to a separate category. Hispanics/Latinos may be of any race.
| Race / Ethnicity (NH = Non-Hispanic) | Pop 1980 | Pop 1990 | Pop 2000 | Pop 2010 | Pop 2020 | % 1980 | % 1990 | % 2000 | % 2010 | % 2020 |
|---|---|---|---|---|---|---|---|---|---|---|
| White alone (NH) | 3,932 | 4,962 | 5,724 | 6,639 | 6,924 | 97.71% | 96.00% | 94.67% | 93.18% | 90.31% |
| Black or African American alone (NH) | 1 | 5 | 2 | 15 | 27 | 0.02% | 0.10% | 0.03% | 0.21% | 0.35% |
| Native American or Alaska Native alone (NH) | 38 | 77 | 90 | 103 | 119 | 0.94% | 1.49% | 1.49% | 1.45% | 1.55% |
| Asian alone (NH) | 5 | 24 | 13 | 31 | 59 | 0.12% | 0.46% | 0.22% | 0.44% | 0.77% |
| Native Hawaiian or Pacific Islander alone (NH) | x | x | 2 | 1 | 1 | x | x | 0.03% | 0.01% | 0.01% |
| Other race alone (NH) | 2 | 0 | 4 | 3 | 18 | 0.05% | 0.00% | 0.07% | 0.04% | 0.23% |
| Mixed race or Multiracial (NH) | x | x | 71 | 70 | 197 | x | x | 1.17% | 0.98% | 2.57% |
| Hispanic or Latino (any race) | 46 | 101 | 140 | 263 | 322 | 1.14% | 1.95% | 2.32% | 3.69% | 4.20% |
| Total | 4,024 | 5,169 | 6,046 | 7,125 | 7,667 | 100.00% | 100.00% | 100.00% | 100.00% | 100.00% |

=== 2020 census ===
According to the 2020 United States census and 2020 American Community Survey, there were 7,667 people in Kane County with a population density of 1.9 people per square mile (0.7/km^{2}). Among non-Hispanic or Latino people, the racial makeup was 6,924 (90.3%) White, 27 (0.4%) African American, 119 (1.6%) Native American, 59 (0.8%) Asian, 1 (0.0%) Pacific Islander, 18 (0.2%) from other races, and 197 (2.6%) from two or more races. 322 (4.2%) people were Hispanic or Latino.

There were 3,808 (49.67%) males and 3,859 (50.33%) females, and the population distribution by age was 1,752 (22.9%) under the age of 18, 3,950 (51.5%) from 18 to 64, and 1,965 (25.6%) who were at least 65 years old. The median age was 44.9 years.

There were 3,081 households in Kane County with an average size of 2.49 of which 1,987 (64.5%) were families and 1,094 (35.5%) were non-families. Among all families, 1,663 (54.0%) were married couples, 110 (3.6%) were male householders with no spouse, and 214 (6.9%) were female householders with no spouse. Among all non-families, 932 (30.2%) were a single person living alone and 162 (5.3%) were two or more people living together. 784 (25.4%) of all households had children under the age of 18. 2,409 (78.2%) of households were owner-occupied while 672 (21.8%) were renter-occupied.

The median income for a Kane County household was $49,486 and the median family income was $69,722, with a per-capita income of $28,142. The median income for males that were full-time employees was $41,368 and for females $34,986. 13.1% of the population and 6.0% of families were below the poverty line.

In terms of education attainment, out of the 5,600 people in Kane County 25 years or older, 480 (8.6%) had not completed high school, 1,391 (24.8%) had a high school diploma or equivalency, 2,066 (36.9%) had some college or associate degree, 1,114 (19.9%) had a bachelor's degree, and 549 (9.8%) had a graduate or professional degree.

=== Ancestry ===
The top 5 ethnic groups in Kane County are:

- English-30%
- German-10%
- Irish-9%
- Danish-5%
- Swedish-4%

== Politics and government ==
Kane is one of the most reliably Republican counties in the nation. Of "straight-ticket" voters in the 2008 election, there were 992 Republicans and 326 Democrats. In the Utah gubernatorial election, 2004 nearly 70% of the county's vote went for Jon Huntsman, Jr. and in the 2008 election he received around 75% of the vote. Kane County is part of Utah's 2nd congressional district and thus was represented by moderate Democrat Jim Matheson for several years until 2013. The second district is now represented by Republican Celeste Maloy.

In Presidential elections, Kane County has only been won once by a Democratic candidate when Woodrow Wilson carried the county in 1916. It was the only county in Utah carried by William McKinley, the Republican opponent who beat William Jennings Bryan. It was also the only county in Utah carried by Alf Landon, the Republican opponent who lost to Franklin Delano Roosevelt in the 1936 Presidential election in the most lopsided Presidential election in over a century. It has solidly favored the Republican candidate since at least 1956, when Dwight D. Eisenhower received approximately 90% of the vote. In 1964, by over thirty-nine percent, the county went for Barry Goldwater, who lost the overall in the state by over nine percent. Since 1920, only in the Democratic landslides of 1936, 1940, and 1964 did the Democratic candidate for president receive even 30% of the county's vote.

State elected offices
| Position | District | Name | Affiliation | First elected |
|---|---|---|---|---|
| Senate | 24 | Derrin Owens | Republican | 2020 |
| House of Representatives | 73 | Logan Monson | Republican | 2018 |
| Board of Education | 14 | Mark Huntsman | Nonpartisan | 2014 |

United States presidential election results for Kane County, Utah
| Year | Republican | | Democratic | | Third party(ies) | |
| Year | No. | % | No. | % | No. | % |
|---|---|---|---|---|---|---|
| 1896 | 288 | 55.60% | 230 | 44.40% | 0 | 0.00% |
| 1900 | 392 | 70.89% | 161 | 29.11% | 0 | 0.00% |
| 1904 | 399 | 79.64% | 102 | 20.36% | 0 | 0.00% |
| 1908 | 415 | 79.81% | 102 | 19.62% | 3 | 0.58% |
| 1912 | 426 | 75.27% | 115 | 20.32% | 25 | 4.42% |
| 1916 | 304 | 46.99% | 329 | 50.85% | 14 | 2.16% |
| 1920 | 501 | 72.61% | 186 | 26.96% | 3 | 0.43% |
| 1924 | 515 | 80.22% | 117 | 18.22% | 10 | 1.56% |
| 1928 | 566 | 79.94% | 141 | 19.92% | 1 | 0.14% |
| 1932 | 618 | 71.86% | 229 | 26.63% | 13 | 1.51% |
| 1936 | 519 | 56.54% | 395 | 43.03% | 4 | 0.44% |
| 1940 | 675 | 66.57% | 339 | 33.43% | 0 | 0.00% |
| 1944 | 662 | 73.07% | 244 | 26.93% | 0 | 0.00% |
| 1948 | 769 | 77.76% | 220 | 22.24% | 0 | 0.00% |
| 1952 | 943 | 85.19% | 164 | 14.81% | 0 | 0.00% |
| 1956 | 939 | 90.20% | 102 | 9.80% | 0 | 0.00% |
| 1960 | 876 | 80.44% | 213 | 19.56% | 0 | 0.00% |
| 1964 | 784 | 69.75% | 340 | 30.25% | 0 | 0.00% |
| 1968 | 814 | 71.72% | 147 | 12.95% | 174 | 15.33% |
| 1972 | 1,146 | 78.82% | 218 | 14.99% | 90 | 6.19% |
| 1976 | 1,094 | 72.50% | 330 | 21.87% | 85 | 5.63% |
| 1980 | 1,492 | 81.35% | 256 | 13.96% | 86 | 4.69% |
| 1984 | 1,710 | 85.12% | 294 | 14.63% | 5 | 0.25% |
| 1988 | 1,788 | 79.29% | 398 | 17.65% | 69 | 3.06% |
| 1992 | 1,241 | 57.14% | 295 | 13.58% | 636 | 29.28% |
| 1996 | 1,682 | 72.63% | 304 | 13.13% | 330 | 14.25% |
| 2000 | 2,254 | 80.44% | 387 | 13.81% | 161 | 5.75% |
| 2004 | 2,414 | 79.12% | 576 | 18.88% | 61 | 2.00% |
| 2008 | 2,212 | 69.65% | 856 | 26.95% | 108 | 3.40% |
| 2012 | 2,522 | 74.81% | 744 | 22.07% | 105 | 3.11% |
| 2016 | 2,265 | 64.02% | 741 | 20.94% | 532 | 15.04% |
| 2020 | 2,998 | 71.72% | 1,083 | 25.91% | 99 | 2.37% |
| 2024 | 3,277 | 73.02% | 1,137 | 25.33% | 74 | 1.65% |

== Communities ==
Map of Kane County communities

=== City ===
- Kanab (county seat)

=== Towns ===
- Alton
- Big Water
- Glendale
- Orderville

=== Unincorporated communities ===
- Bullfrog
- Duck Creek Village
- Mount Carmel
- Mount Carmel Junction

=== Ghost towns ===
- Johnson
- Paria

== Education ==
There is one school district, Kane School District.

Utah State University also has a local campus in Kanab.

== See also ==
- National Register of Historic Places listings in Kane County, Utah
