= National Register of Historic Places listings in Bryce Canyon National Park =

This is a list of the National Register of Historic Places listings in Bryce Canyon National Park.

This is intended to be a complete list of the properties and districts on the National Register of Historic Places in Bryce Canyon National Park, Utah, United States. The locations of National Register properties and districts for which the latitude and longitude coordinates are included below, may be seen in a Google map.

There are 13 properties and districts listed on the National Register in the park, one of which is a National Historic Landmark.

This National Park Service list is complete through NPS recent listings posted June 20, 2025.

== Current listings ==
	Name on the Register	Image	Date listed	Location	City or town	Description
1	Bryce Canyon Lodge and Deluxe Cabins	Bryce Canyon Lodge and Deluxe Cabins	May 28, 1987 (#87001339)	State Route 63; 37°37′41″N 112°10′00″W	Bryce Canyon National Park	National Historic Landmark lodge and tourist cabins. Expanded 1995 with regular NRHP overlay
2	Bryce Canyon Lodge Historic District	Bryce Canyon Lodge Historic District	April 25, 1995 (#95000434)	Bryce Canyon National Park; 37°37′37″N 112°10′02″W	Bryce Canyon National Park	Expands district around Bryce Canyon Lodge, but is not National Historic Landmark-designated
3	Bryce Canyon National Park Scenic Trails Historic District	Bryce Canyon National Park Scenic Trails Historic District	April 25, 1995 (#95000422)	Bryce Canyon National Park; 37°37′33″N 112°09′23″W	Bryce Canyon National Park	Comprises five contiguous trails: Navajo Loop Trail, Queen's Garden Trail, Peekaboo Loop Trail, Fairyland Loop Trail, Rim Trail
4	Bryce Inn	Bryce Inn	April 25, 1995 (#95000425)	Bryce Canyon National Park; 37°38′08″N 112°09′51″W	Bryce Canyon National Park	Central lodge of a former housekeeping cabin facility, now a store
5	Horse Barn	Horse Barn	April 25, 1995 (#95000433)	Bryce Canyon National Park; 37°37′35″N 112°10′53″W	Bryce Canyon National Park	Former horse barn, now relocated and used as a repair shop.
6	Loop C Comfort Station	Loop C Comfort Station	April 25, 1995 (#95000428)	North Campground, Bryce Canyon National Park; 37°38′10″N 112°09′54″W	Bryce Canyon National Park	Part of the first planned campground in the park
7	Loop D Comfort Station	Loop D Comfort Station	April 25, 1995 (#95000429)	North Campground, Bryce Canyon National Park; 37°38′05″N 112°09′58″W	Bryce Canyon National Park	Part of the first planned campground in the park
8	Old Administration Building	Old Administration Building	April 24, 1995 (#95000430)	Bryce Canyon National Park; 37°37′53″N 112°09′52″W	Bryce Canyon National Park	The park's first administration building
9	Old National Park Service Housing Historic District	Old National Park Service Housing Historic District	April 25, 1995 (#95000424)	Bryce Canyon National Park; 37°37′50″N 112°10′06″W	Bryce Canyon National Park	Rustic-style housing for Park Service employees
10	Rainbow Point Comfort Station and Overlook Shelter	Rainbow Point Comfort Station and Overlook Shelter	April 25, 1995 (#95000427)	Bryce Canyon National Park; 37°28′31″N 112°14′21″W	Bryce Canyon National Park	
11	Riggs Spring Fire Trail		April 25, 1995 (#95000431)	Bryce Canyon National Park; 37°27′47″N 112°14′15″W	Bryce Canyon National Park	
12	Under-the-Rim Trail	Under-the-Rim Trail	April 25, 1995 (#95000423)	Bryce Canyon National Park; 37°33′44″N 112°12′57″W	Bryce Canyon National Park	
13	Utah Parks Company Service Station	Utah Parks Company Service Station	April 25, 1995 (#95000426)	Bryce Canyon National Park; 37°37′45″N 112°09′59″W	Bryce Canyon National Park	Built by the Utah Parks Company in a combination of modern and rustic styles

== See also ==
- National Register of Historic Places listings in Garfield County, Utah
- List of National Historic Landmarks in Utah
