= National Register of Historic Places listings in Garfield County, Utah =

Location of Garfield County in Utah

This is a list of the National Register of Historic Places listings in Garfield County, Utah.

This is intended to be a complete list of the properties and districts on the National Register of Historic Places in Garfield County, Utah, United States. Latitude and longitude coordinates are provided for many National Register properties and districts; these locations may be seen together in a map.

There are 27 properties and districts listed on the National Register in the county, including 1 National Historic Landmark.

This National Park Service list is complete through NPS recent listings posted May 29, 2026.

== Current listings ==
	Name on the Register	Image	Date listed	Location	City or town	Description
1	Boulder Elementary School		April 1, 1985 (#85000805)	351 N. 100 East; 37°54′32″N 111°25′25″W	Boulder	PWA Moderne school built 1935-36 as a Public Works Administration project. Now houses Boulder Town Office.
2	Bryce Canyon Airport	Bryce Canyon Airport	October 19, 1978 (#78002660)	Southeast of Panguitch off State Route 12; 37°42′04″N 112°09′15″W	Panguitch	
3	Bryce Canyon Lodge and Deluxe Cabins	Bryce Canyon Lodge and Deluxe Cabins	May 28, 1987 (#87001339)	State Route 63; 37°37′36″N 112°10′04″W	Bryce Canyon National Park	Expanded 1995 with regular NRHP overlay
4	Bryce Canyon Lodge Historic District	Bryce Canyon Lodge Historic District	April 25, 1995 (#95000434)	Bryce Canyon National Park; 37°37′37″N 112°10′02″W	Bryce Canyon National Park	Expands district around Bryce Canyon Lodge, but is not National Historic Landmark-designated
5	Bryce Canyon National Park Scenic Trails Historic District	Bryce Canyon National Park Scenic Trails Historic District	April 25, 1995 (#95000422)	Bryce Canyon National Park; 37°37′33″N 112°09′23″W	Bryce Canyon National Park	Comprises five contiguous trails: Navajo Loop Trail, Queen's Garden Trail, Peekaboo Loop Trail, Fairyland Loop Trail, Rim Trail
6	Bryce Inn	Bryce Inn	April 25, 1995 (#95000425)	Bryce Canyon National Park; 37°38′08″N 112°09′51″W	Bryce Canyon National Park	
7	Chaffin Camp Site		June 27, 2019 (#100004110)	Address Restricted	Hite vicinity	
7	Coombs Village Site	Coombs Village Site	January 1, 1976 (#76001815)	State Route 117; 37°54′38″N 111°25′21″W	Boulder	A partially excavated Puebloan village, now part of Anasazi Indian State Park
8	Escalante Historic District	Escalante Historic District	March 27, 2013 (#13000127)	Roughly bounded by 300 North, 300 East, 300 South, 300 & 400 West Sts. 37°46′13″N 111°36′01″W	Escalante	
9	Friendship Cove Pictograph		December 21, 1978 (#78002659)	Address Restricted	Escalante	
10	William Jasper, Jr., and Elizabeth Henderson House	William Jasper, Jr., and Elizabeth Henderson House	April 5, 2006 (#06000230)	85 N. Main St. (Kodachrome Highway); 37°34′04″N 112°03′16″W	Cannonville	
11	Hole-in-the-Rock Trail	Hole-in-the-Rock Trail	August 9, 1982 (#82004792)	A trail commencing at Escalante and terminating at Bluff; 37°25′18″N 110°39′51″W	Escalante	Split between Garfield, Kane, and San Juan counties
12	Horse Barn	Horse Barn	April 25, 1995 (#95000433)	Bryce Canyon National Park; 37°37′35″N 112°10′53″W	Bryce Canyon National Park	
13	Kolb Brothers "Cat Camp" Inscription		October 7, 1988 (#88001250)	Big Drop #2 vicinity, Canyonlands National Park; 38°04′57″N 110°02′32″W	Moab	
14	Loop C Comfort Station	Loop C Comfort Station	April 25, 1995 (#95000428)	North Campground, Bryce Canyon National Park; 37°38′10″N 112°09′54″W	Bryce Canyon National Park	
15	Loop D Comfort Station	Loop D Comfort Station	April 25, 1995 (#95000429)	North Campground, Bryce Canyon National Park; 37°38′05″N 112°09′58″W	Bryce Canyon National Park	
16	Oak Creek Dam		September 13, 1999 (#99001091)	Oak Creek, north of North Coleman Canyon; 38°05′00″N 111°08′15″W	Torrey	
17	Old Administration Building	Old Administration Building	April 24, 1995 (#95000430)	Bryce Canyon National Park; 37°37′53″N 112°09′52″W	Bryce Canyon National Park	
18	Old National Park Service Housing Historic District	Old National Park Service Housing Historic District	April 25, 1995 (#95000424)	Bryce Canyon National Park; 37°37′50″N 112°10′06″W	Bryce Canyon National Park	
19	William T., Jr., and Mary Isabell R. Owens House	William T., Jr., and Mary Isabell R. Owens House	March 25, 1999 (#99000399)	95 N. 100 East; 37°49′26″N 112°26′00″W	Panguitch	
20	Panguitch Carnegie Library	Panguitch Carnegie Library	October 25, 1984 (#84000148)	75 E. Center St. 37°49′23″N 112°26′01″W	Panguitch	
21	Panguitch Historic District	Panguitch Historic District	November 16, 2006 (#06001068)	Roughly bounded by 500 North, 400 East, 500 South, and 300 West; 37°49′25″N 112°26′00″W	Panguitch	
22	Panguitch Social Hall	Panguitch Social Hall	November 12, 1998 (#98001376)	50 E. Center St. 37°49′21″N 112°25′58″W	Panguitch	
23	Pole Hollow Archeological Site		July 16, 1981 (#81000581)	Address Restricted	Panguitch	
24	Starr Ranch		April 23, 1976 (#76001816)	15 miles (24 km) north of Ticaboo, off SR-276; 37°51′03″N 110°39′53″W	Ticaboo	
25	Under-the-Rim Trail	Under-the-Rim Trail	April 25, 1995 (#95000423)	Bryce Canyon National Park; 37°33′44″N 112°12′57″W	Bryce Canyon National Park	
26	Utah Parks Company Service Station	Utah Parks Company Service Station	April 25, 1995 (#95000426)	Bryce Canyon National Park; 37°37′45″N 112°09′59″W	Bryce Canyon National Park	

== See also ==
- List of National Historic Landmarks in Utah
- National Register of Historic Places listings in Utah
- National Register of Historic Places listings in Bryce Canyon National Park
