= National Register of Historic Places listings in Kane County, Utah =

Location of Kane County in Utah

This is a list of the National Register of Historic Places listings in Kane County, Utah.

This is intended to be a complete list of the properties and districts on the National Register of Historic Places in Kane County, Utah, United States. Latitude and longitude coordinates are provided for many National Register properties and districts; these locations may be seen together in a map.

There are 22 properties listed on the National Register in the county, and one former listing.

This National Park Service list is complete through NPS recent listings posted December 19, 2025.

== Current listings ==
	Name on the Register	Image	Date listed	Location	City or town	Description
1	Bowman-Chamberlain House	Bowman-Chamberlain House	July 8, 1975 (#75001811)	14 East 100 South; 37°02′47″N 112°31′37″W	Kanab	
2	Cottonwood Canyon Cliff Dwelling		August 18, 1980 (#80003910)	Address Restricted	Kanab	
3	Davis Gulch Pictograph Panel		June 5, 1975 (#75000166)	Address Restricted	Glen Canyon	
4	East Entrance Checking Station	East Entrance Checking Station	February 14, 1987 (#86003711)	Island in middle of State Route 9; 37°14′01″N 112°52′06″W	Zion National Park	Also included in National Register of Historic Places listings in Zion National Park
5	East Entrance Residence	East Entrance Residence	February 14, 1987 (#86003712)	Eastern entrance 150 feet north of State Route 9; 37°14′01″N 112°52′41″W	Zion National Park	Also included in National Register of Historic Places listings in Zion National Park
6	East Entrance Sign	East Entrance Sign	July 7, 1987 (#86003710)	East Entrance Checking Station on northern and southern sides of State Route 9; 37°14′07″N 112°52′07″W	Zion National Park	Also included in National Register of Historic Places listings in Zion National Park
7	Maynard and Edith Hamlin Dixon House and Studio	Maynard and Edith Hamlin Dixon House and Studio	January 11, 2002 (#01001450)	U.S. Route 89; 37°15′13″N 112°39′37″W	Orderville	
8	Hole-In-The-Rock	Hole-In-The-Rock	November 3, 1975 (#75000165)	Southeast of Escalante in Glen Canyon National Recreation Area; 37°15′31″N 110°54′00″W	Escalante	
9	Hole-in-the-Rock Trail	Hole-in-the-Rock Trail	August 9, 1982 (#82004792)	A trail commencing at Escalante and terminating at Bluff; 37°25′18″N 110°39′51″W	Escalante	Split between Garfield, Kane, and San Juan counties
10	William Derby Johnson Jr. House	William Derby Johnson Jr. House	April 6, 2001 (#01000315)	54 South Main Street; 37°02′49″N 112°31′42″W	Kanab	The Purple Sage Inn Bed and Breakfast is here in 2013.
11	Kanab (Union Pacific) Lodge	Kanab (Union Pacific) Lodge	August 14, 2003 (#03000153)	86 South 200 West; 37°02′48″N 112°31′57″W	Kanab	Former home of the Wok Inn, the building seemed deserted in 2013.
12	Kanab Hotel and Cafe	Kanab Hotel and Cafe	August 14, 2003 (#03000152)	19 West Center Street; 37°02′52″N 112°31′42″W	Kanab	
13	Kanab Library	Kanab Library	September 7, 1995 (#95001067)	6 South 100 East; 37°02′53″N 112°31′33″W	Kanab	
14	Kanab Post Office	Kanab Post Office	January 24, 2011 (#10001175)	22 North Main Street; 37°02′55″N 112°31′43″W	Kanab	Kanab, Utah MPS
15	Mt. Carmel School and Church	Mt. Carmel School and Church	November 20, 1987 (#87002061)	Off U.S. Route 89; 37°14′48″N 112°39′55″W	Orderville	
16	Parry Lodge	Parry Lodge	August 14, 2003 (#02001734)	89 East Center Street; 37°02′54″N 112°31′34″W	Kanab	
17	Paso por Aqui-Anno 1776 Inscription		August 17, 2018 (#100002785)	Address Restricted	Big Water vicinity	
18	Rainbow Point Comfort Station and Overlook Shelter	Rainbow Point Comfort Station and Overlook Shelter	April 25, 1995 (#95000427)	Bryce Canyon National Park; 37°28′31″N 112°14′21″W	Bryce Canyon National Park	
19	Rider-Pugh House	Rider-Pugh House	April 6, 2001 (#01000316)	17 West 100 South; 37°02′49″N 112°31′42″W	Kanab	
20	Riggs Spring Fire Trail		April 25, 1995 (#95000431)	Bryce Canyon National Park; 37°27′47″N 112°14′15″W	Bryce Canyon National Park	
21	Stewart-Woolley House	Stewart-Woolley House	April 6, 2001 (#01000314)	106 West 100 North; 37°03′00″N 112°31′49″W	Kanab	
22	Zion – Mount Carmel Highway	Zion – Mount Carmel Highway	July 7, 1987 (#86003709)	Along Utah State Route 9 between Springdale and Mount Carmel Junction; 37°13′19″N 112°55′58″W	Zion National Park (primarily)	Also included in National Register of Historic Places listings in Washington County, Utah and National Register of Historic Places listings in Zion National Park

== Former listings ==
	Name on the Register	Image	Date listed	Date removed	Location	City or town	Description
1	Valley School		April 1, 1985 (#85000807)	December 29, 2025	150 North Main Street; 37°16′45″N 112°38′18″W	Orderville	

== See also ==
- National Register of Historic Places listings in Zion National Park
- List of National Historic Landmarks in Utah
- National Register of Historic Places listings in Utah
