= Bryce Canyon National Park Scenic Trails Historic District =

Historic district in Utah, United States

- U.S. National Register of Historic Places
- U.S. Historic district
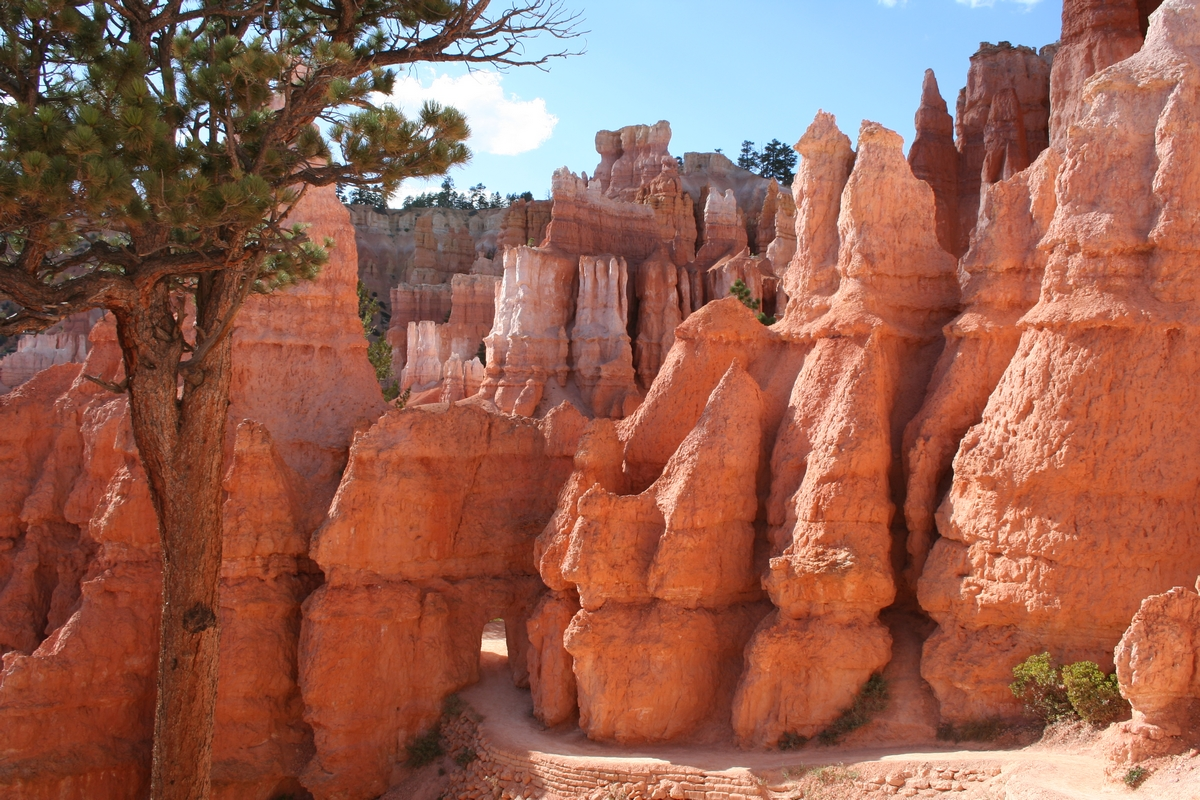
- Queen's Garden Trail, August 2006

- Location within Utah Location within the United States
- Nearest city: Bryce Canyon, Utah
- Coordinates: 37°37′32″N 112°09′50″W
- Area: 51 acres (21 ha)
- Built by: Civilian Conservation Corps
- Architect: National Park Service
- MPS: Bryce Canyon National Park MPS
- NRHP reference No.: 95000422
- Added to NRHP: April 25, 1995

The Bryce Canyon National Park Scenic Trails Historic District is a historic trail system in the central part of Bryce Canyon National Park in southwestern Garfield County, Utah, United States, that is listed on the National Register of Historic Places (NRHP).

== Description ==
The trail system that was developed to allow day hikers to view or to descend into National Park's natural amphitheater of eroded limestone hoodoos from the developed portion of the park on the rim of the Paunsaugunt Plateau. Five trails are included in the NRHP district: the Navajo Loop Trail, the Queen's Garden Trail, the Fairyland Trail, the Peekaboo Loop Trail, and the Rim Trail. Mainly built between 1917 and 1935, these trails intersect to create a continuous network of trails. Portions of the trails were constructed by Civilian Conservation Corps labor from CCC Camp NP-3.

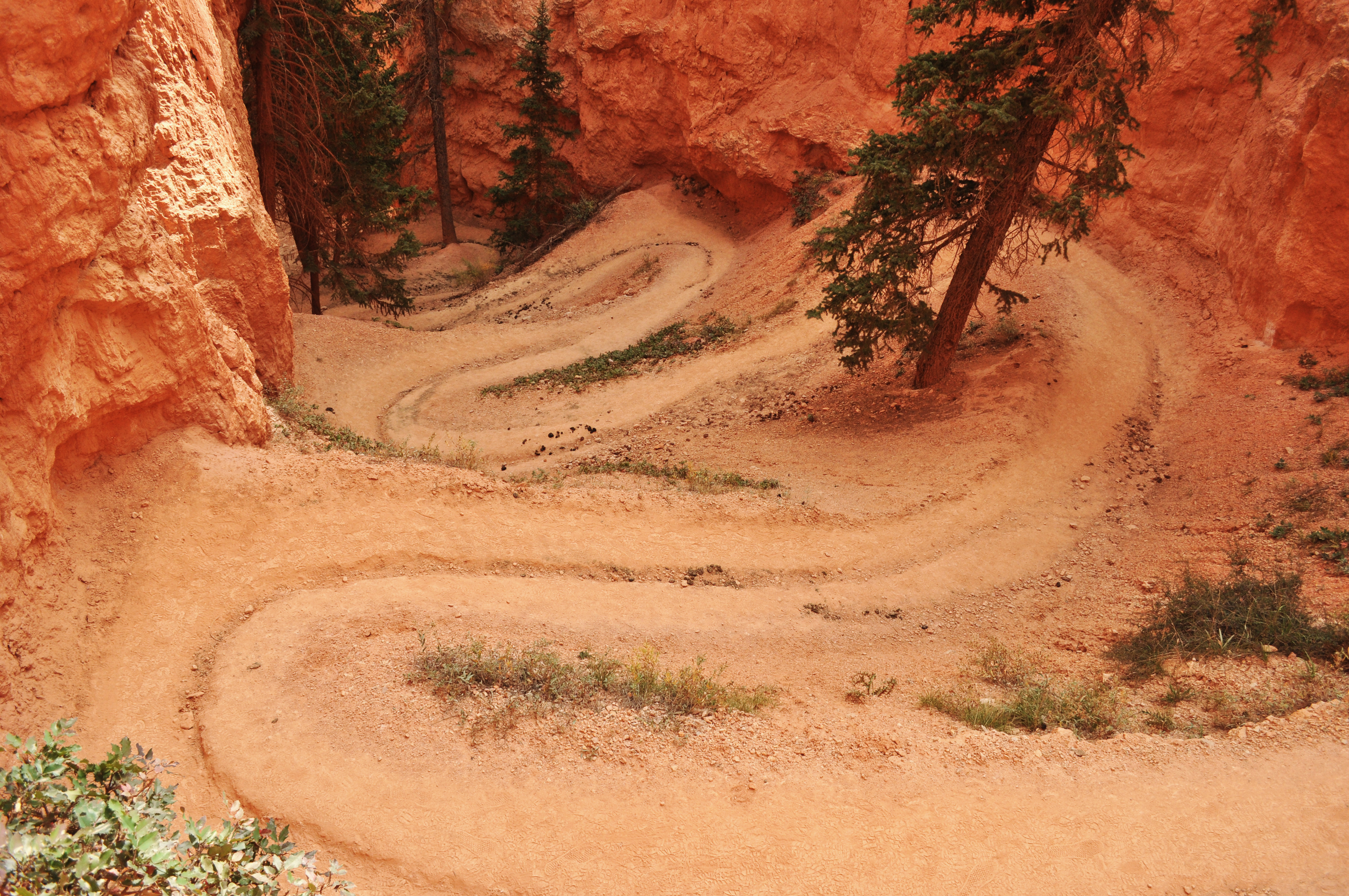
Looking down on the Peekaboo Loop Trail, October 2012

The Navajo Loop Trail closely follows its original alignment, leading to the "Wall Street" section of the amphitheater. The Queen's Garden Trail covers the area between Sunrise and Sunset Points, leading to the Queen Victoria rock formation. The trail includes two tunnels. The Peekaboo Loop Trail is about 4.4 miles (7.1 km) long, starting at Bryce Point. The eastern portion of the loop enters Peekaboo Canyon, then crosses to Bryce Canyon, then back into the Peekaboo Canyon drainage along the base of the Wall of Windows formation. The trail returns through a tunnel. The Fairyland Trail is about 5 miles (8.0 km) long, running through Fairyland and Campbell canyons. The Rim Trail follows the edge of the Paunsaugunt Plateau for 5.3 miles (8.5 km) between Fairyland Point and Bryce Point. Portions of especially heavy use have asphalt paving.

The Under-the-Rim Trail and the Riggs Spring Fire Trail connect to the day-hike trail system to provide access to the park's backcountry. Both are separately listed on the NRHP.

The Bryce Canyon trail system was placed on the National Register of Historic Places on April 25, 1995.

== History ==
Early trail construction focused on the area adjacent to the Bryce Canyon Lodge between Sunrise Point and Sunset Point. It is believed that what is now the Navajo Loop Trail incorporates sections from 1917, immediately after the National Park Service took over administration from the U.S. Forest Service, and may include some earlier USFS-built paths. The Queen's Garden Trail, the Navajo Trail and the Peekaboo Loop Trail were completed about 1929, most for foot traffic, with horse and foot traffic for the Peekaboo trail. This trail featured a spring with a horse trough and water fountain. Additional connecting trails were built at this time. The remainder of the trails in the district were completed between 1929 and 1935. Portions of the Rim Trail and the Fairyland Trail were built by the Civilian Conservation Corps in 1934-35.

== See also ==
- National Register of Historic Places listings in Bryce Canyon National Park
- National Register of Historic Places listings in Garfield County, Utah
