= Horse Barn =

Horse Barn may refer to:

- Horse Barn (Nampa, Idaho), listed on the National Register of Historic Places in Canyon County, Idaho
- Horse Barn (Bryce Canyon, Utah), listed on the National Register of Historic Places in Garfield County, Utah
