= Bryce Canyon Natural History Association =

American non-profit organization

Bryce Canyon Natural History Association (BCNHA) is a non-profit organization created in 1961 to aid the National Park Service at Bryce Canyon National Park, and the USDA Forest Service on the Dixie National Forest. A portion of the profits from all bookstore sales are donated to these public land units.

== BCNHA Role ==
BCNHA is a diverse organization and has an educational institution that functions as part of the interpretive arm of Bryce Canyon National Park. Donated funds are requested by the agencies to support educational, interpretive, and scientific activities or projects. These can include production and printing of free publications, construction of information kiosks, or the financing of roadside displays, trail guides and maps.

BCNHA offers a variety of publications dealing with the resources of its partner agencies, including geology, archeology, plants, wildlife and more. All items offered for sale are carefully reviewed by subject matter experts, and must be found to be educational in nature and of excellent interpretive value.

== History ==
The organization was originally part of the Zion-Bryce Natural History Association founded in 1930. Bryce Canyon Natural History Association was formally separated from Zion in 1961. In 2002, BCNHA expanded beyond its cooperative relationship with the National Park Service to begin serving the Forest Service on the Dixie National Forest and along Scenic Highway 12.

== High Plateaus Institute ==
The BCNHA is also in the process of implementing the High Plateaus Institute. The High Plateau Institute is a nonprofit field institute operated in partnership with Bryce Canyon National Park and Dixie National Forest. The institute will offer field courses and a research facility for the high plateau region of southern Utah. Institute courses are intended to appeal to students of all backgrounds, from teachers in search of new information for their classes, to researchers needing a base to analyze data. Courses will be located in various areas of southern Utah and taught by college professors, field biologists, and other experts.

== Board of trustees ==
The BCNHA is a non-profit, tax exempt 501(c)(3) organization governed by a board of trustees who serve without remuneration. The board is composed of community and professional leaders who have a special interest in Bryce Canyon and southern Utah. The Superintendent of Bryce Canyon National Park and the Chief of Interpretation as well as Forest Service representatives attend all board meetings to maintain a high level of coordination between the Association and its partners.
