= Stewart-Woolley House =

- Stewart--Woolley House
- U.S. National Register of Historic Places
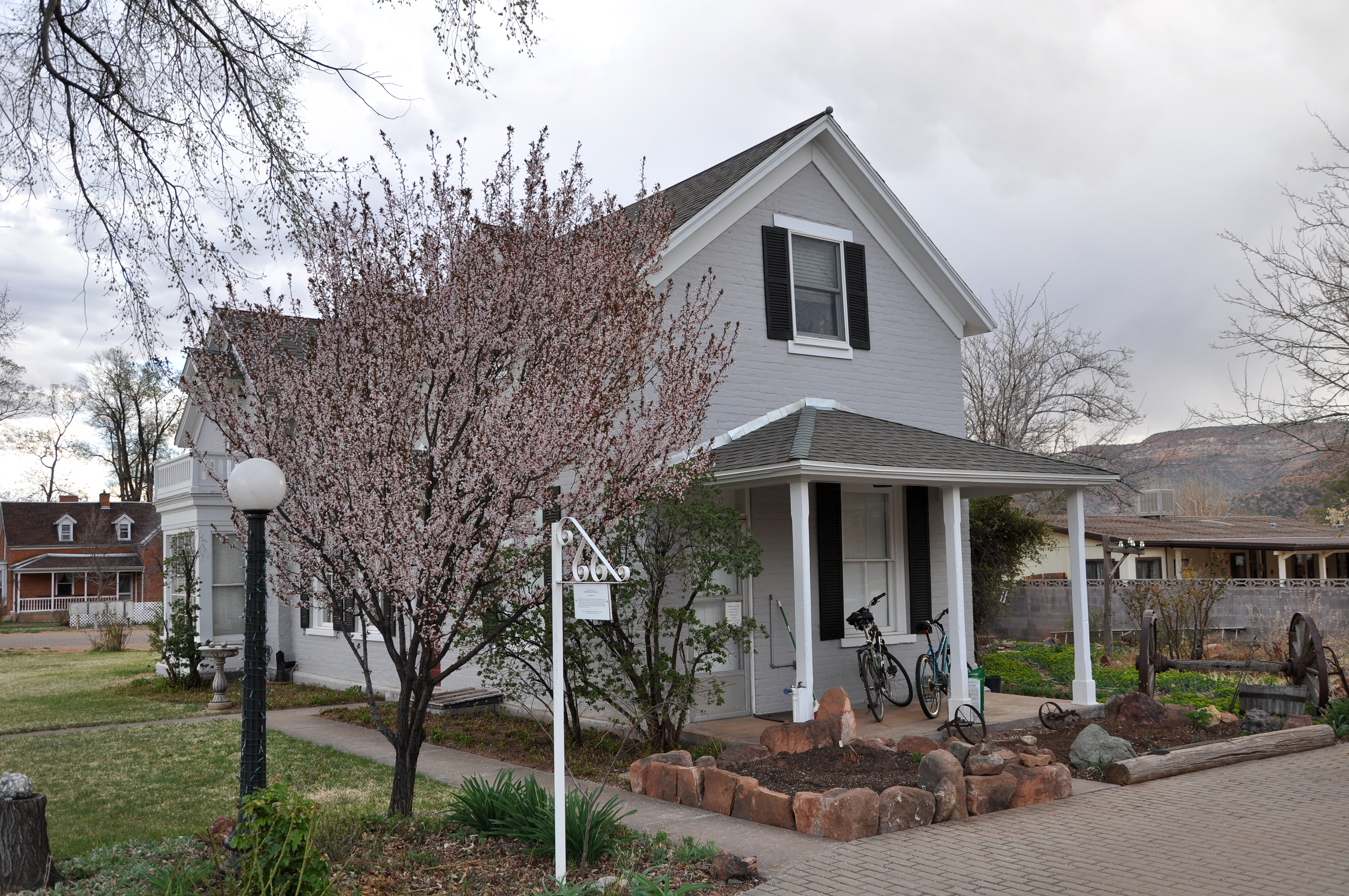
- The house in 2013

- Location within Utah Location within the United States
- Location: 106 West 100 North, Kanab, Utah
- Coordinates: 37°03′00″N 112°31′49″W
- Area: 0.3 acres (0.12 ha)
- Built: 1872
- Architectural style: Gothic Revival, Late Victorian
- MPS: Kanab, Utah MPS
- NRHP reference No.: 01000314
- Added to NRHP: April 6, 2001

The Stewart-Woolley House is a historic house in Kanab, Utah. It was built in 1872 for Levi Stewart, who converted to the Church of Jesus Christ of Latter-day Saints with his family in Illinois in 1837. Stewart moved to Kanab in 1870, where he first stayed in an old fort. He built his house shortly after, and it was designed in the Gothic Revival and Late Victorian styles. Stewart served as the local bishop. The house was acquired by Edwin D. Woolley, a native of Nauvoo, Illinois, in 1889. Woolley had two wives, Emma Geneva Bentley, with whom he had twelve children, and Flora Ashby Snow, with whom he had nine children. He lived in this house with his first wife, Emma, and their children, including Mary E. Woolley Chamberlain, who served as the mayor of Kanab from 1911 to 1913. The house has been listed on the National Register of Historic Places since April 6, 2001.
