= Utah Parks Company Service Station =

- U.S. National Register of Historic Places
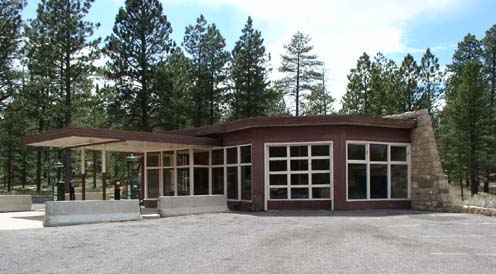

- Location within Utah Location within the United States
- Nearest city: Bryce Canyon, Utah
- Coordinates: 37°37′45″N 112°9′59″W
- Built: 1947
- Architect: Spence, Ambrose; et al.
- Architectural style: Modern Movement
- MPS: Bryce Canyon National Park MPS
- NRHP reference No.: 95000426
- Added to NRHP: April 25, 1995

The Utah Parks Company Service Station in Bryce Canyon National Park was built in 1947 to serve automobile-borne visitors to the park. The service station was designed for the Utah Parks Company by architect Ambrose Spence in a style that was sympathetic to the prevailing National Park Service Rustic style, but was much simpler and more modern in character. In this manner, it foreshadowed the consciously simplified designs developed during the Mission 66 project.

The service station is located between the Bryce Canyon Lodge and Sunrise Point. The dominant feature is a coursed sandstone wall that curves around the structure. The front of the service station is similar to many modern stations, with a series of flat roofs in different planes projecting from the stone wall. A prominent canopy shelters the pumps. The interior comprises a sales room, storage room, service bay and two toilets.

The station was placed on the National Register of Historic Places in 1995.
