= Panguitch Historic District =

Historic district in Utah, United States

- U.S. National Register of Historic Places
- U.S. Historic district
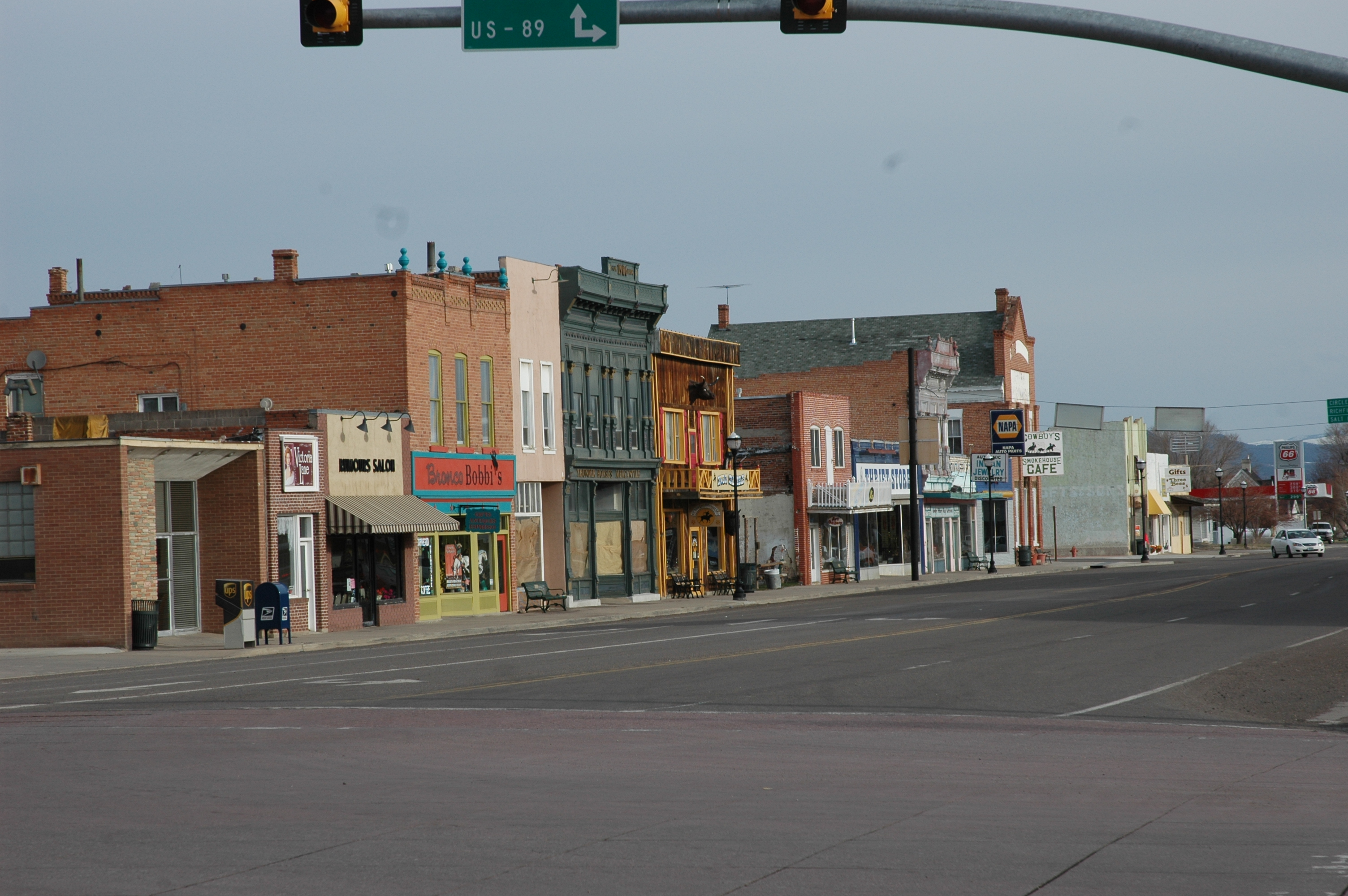
- North on Main Street (US-89) in Panguitch, April 2010

- Location within Utah Location within the United States
- Location: Roughly bounded by 500 North, 400 East, 500 South, and 300 West; Panguitch, Utah; United States
- Coordinates: 37°49′21.5″N 112°26′08.1″W
- Area: 420 acres (170 ha)
- Built: 1871
- Architectural style: Mid 19th Century Revival, Late Victorian
- NRHP reference No.: 06001068
- Added to NRHP: November 16, 2006

The Panguitch Historic District is a historic district that comprises the center of Panguitch, Utah, United States, that is listed on the National Register of Historic Places. It included 379 contributing buildings and two contributing objects.

The most prominent and substantial house is the Ira Hatch House (1896), on a full acre located at 329 E. Center (37.823279°N 112.429197°W). It is "a two-story brick central-block-with-projecting-wings house type with a mix of Victorian Eclectic and Queen Anne elements such as the square tower", and it "was the highest valued ($6,000) residence on the 1930 census." The house was in fact designed by noted Salt Lake City architect Richard Kettling.

== Description ==
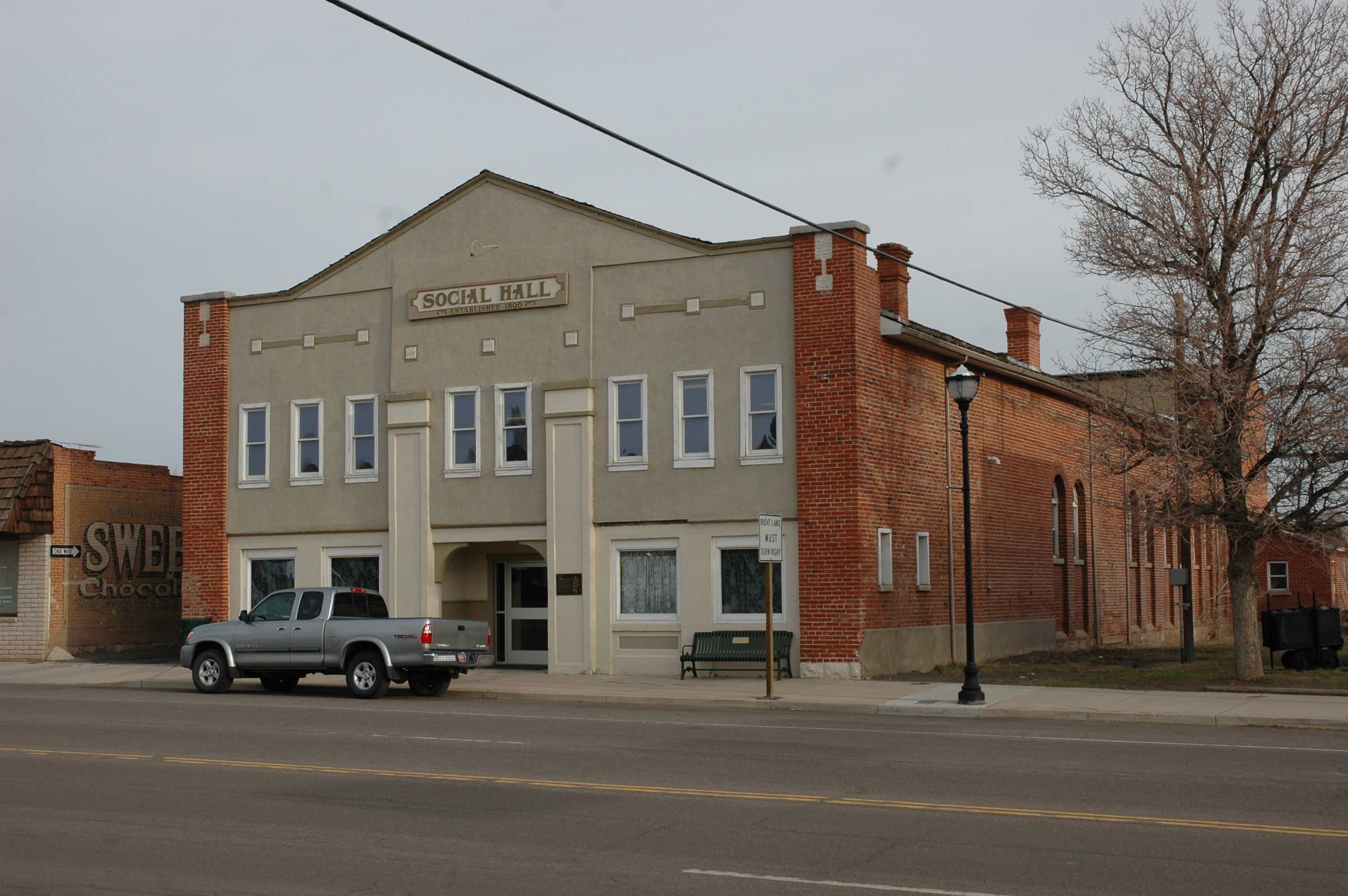
Panguitch Social Hall, April 2010

The district encompasses the historical portion of the town, comprising 642 structures, of which 379 are considered contributing structures to the historic district. Most of the buildings in the district are residences built between 1890 and 1930, with a proportion of commercial buildings at the center of town. Most buildings are built in red brick, many using a distinctive deep red brick with soft edges that was produced near Panguitch between 1915 and 1940. Many houses are of a distinctive local style with a square plan and a pyramidal roof, incorporating projecting bays. The district also includes 1950s and 1960s ranch houses and motel courts. The town is laid out in a grid, conforming to usual practices in Utah's Mormon communities.

Notable buildings listed separately on the National Register of Historic Places include the Panguitch Carnegie Library, the Panguitch Social Hall and the William T., Jr., and Mary Isabell R. Owens House.

The Panguitch Historic District was placed on the National Register of Historic Places on November 16, 2006.

== See also ==
- National Register of Historic Places listings in Garfield County, Utah
