= Kanab Lodge =

Historic house in Utah, United States

- Kanab Union Pacific Lodge
- U.S. National Register of Historic Places
- Location within Utah Location within the United States
- Location: 86 S 200 W, Kanab, Utah
- Coordinates: 37°2′48″N 112°31′57″W
- Built: 1925
- Architectural style: Late Victorian, Colonial Revival
- MPS: Kanab, Utah MPS
- NRHP reference No.: 03000153
- Added to NRHP: August 14, 2003

The historic building now operated as the restaurant Jakes Chaparral had a number of prior uses including Kanab Lodge, Parry Cafeteria, Utah Parks Building and Wok Inn restaurant in Kanab, Utah, USA. The original section of the lodge is a house built in 1885, which was expanded between 1928 and 1932 by the Utah Parks Company to serve as a rest stop for tourists about halfway between the north rim of the Grand Canyon and Zion or Bryce Canyon National Parks.

== History ==
The original house was probably built for Frank and Lovinnia Farnsworth. The house passed through several owners, ending with Lewis and Vinnie Farnsworth Jepson in 1904. Vinnie was the daughter of Frank and Lovinnia Farnsworth. The Jepsons finished the upstairs of the 1½ story house, installing a wooden bathtub that was stated to be one of only two built-in bathtubs in Kanab at the time. The Jepsons probably added to the rear of the property at the same time. They sold the house in 1925 to the Hiway Tourist Park and Company, a local tour bus operation owned by brothers Gronway Parry, Caleb Parry and Chauncey Parry. The Parrys worked with William W. Wylie, a pioneer of tourism in Yellowstone National Park, to provide tour services in Grand Canyon's north rim, Zion, Bryce and Cedar Breaks National Monument. The Parrys converted the Jepson house for use as the Parry Cafeteria in 1925. The Parry brothers later established the Parry Lodge, which is still in operation today, at the corner of Center Street and 100 East, where they remodeled a frame house, and built several cottage-type motel units.

The Utah Parks Company was set up by the Union Pacific Railroad to provide tourist services at the southern Utah parks. Under pressure from Union Pacific, the Parry brothers sold the cafeteria transportation company to Union Pacific in 1927, retaining some of the bus routes. Chauncey Parry became superintendent of the bus line. The railroad started a major expansion of the lodge, concluding in 1932 with a lobby, dining room and kitchen as well as toilets and a souvenir shop. The restaurant served only lunch, and only for bus tour patrons: it was not open to the general public. A 1938 laundry addition served as a central laundry for all of its park operations in the area.

As tourists increasingly arrived in their own cars, the bus business declined. The restaurant and curio shop closed in 1960, the laundry continuing until 1967. Vacant from 1967 to 1973, the property was acquired by Stan Clark who renovated the restaurant and converted the laundry to a theater, calling the operation The Old West Company, and continuing to 1978. In 1980 a partnership bought the property and opened the Territorial Inn Restaurant, which operated until 1987, when it became the Wok Inn restaurant. The restaurant known as Jake's Chaparral began operating at this location in 2014.

== Description ==
The original house is a 1½ story brick house on a sandstone foundation. A series of additions extend to the south, far exceeding the house in size. In order, the expansions include a lobby attached to the original house, a two-story dining room backed by the kitchen, and an overflow dining room. To the west from the kitchen and overflow, a storage area links to the former theater/laundry, now a dance hall. The semi-enclosed interior courtyard formed by the complex is finished as a faux-Western streetscape.

The Kanab Lodge was listed on the National Register of Historic Places in 2003.
