= Old Administration Building (Bryce Canyon National Park) =

- Administration Building, Old
- U.S. National Register of Historic Places
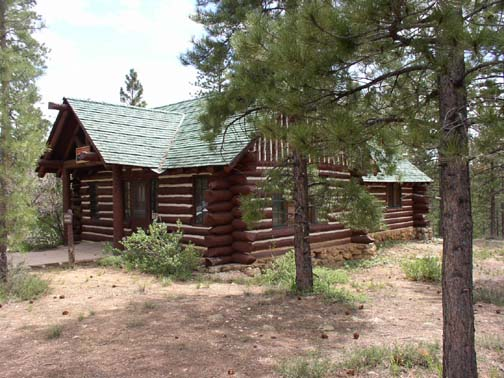

- Location within Utah Location within the United States
- Nearest city: Bryce Canyon, Utah
- Coordinates: 37°37′53″N 112°9′52″W
- Built: 1933
- Architect: NPS
- Architectural style: NPS Rustic
- MPS: Bryce Canyon National Park MPS
- NRHP reference No.: 95000430
- Added to NRHP: April 24, 1995

The Old Administration Building at Bryce Canyon National Park, Utah, U.S.A., also known as the Bryce Canyon Nature Museum, was the first National Park Service building built within the park. Located near Sunrise Point in a heavily used portion of the park, the building was designed by the National Park Service Branch of Plans and Designs in the National Park Service Rustic style preferred at the time for park structures. It is in the immediate vicinity of the Bryce Inn.

The Administration Building was built in 1933 in logs on a stone foundation. The T-shaped 1-1/2 story building was built in two phases. The first phase was the large public room in the eastern portion of the building. The addition contained Park Service office space.
