= Kanab Hotel and Cafe =

- U.S. National Register of Historic Places
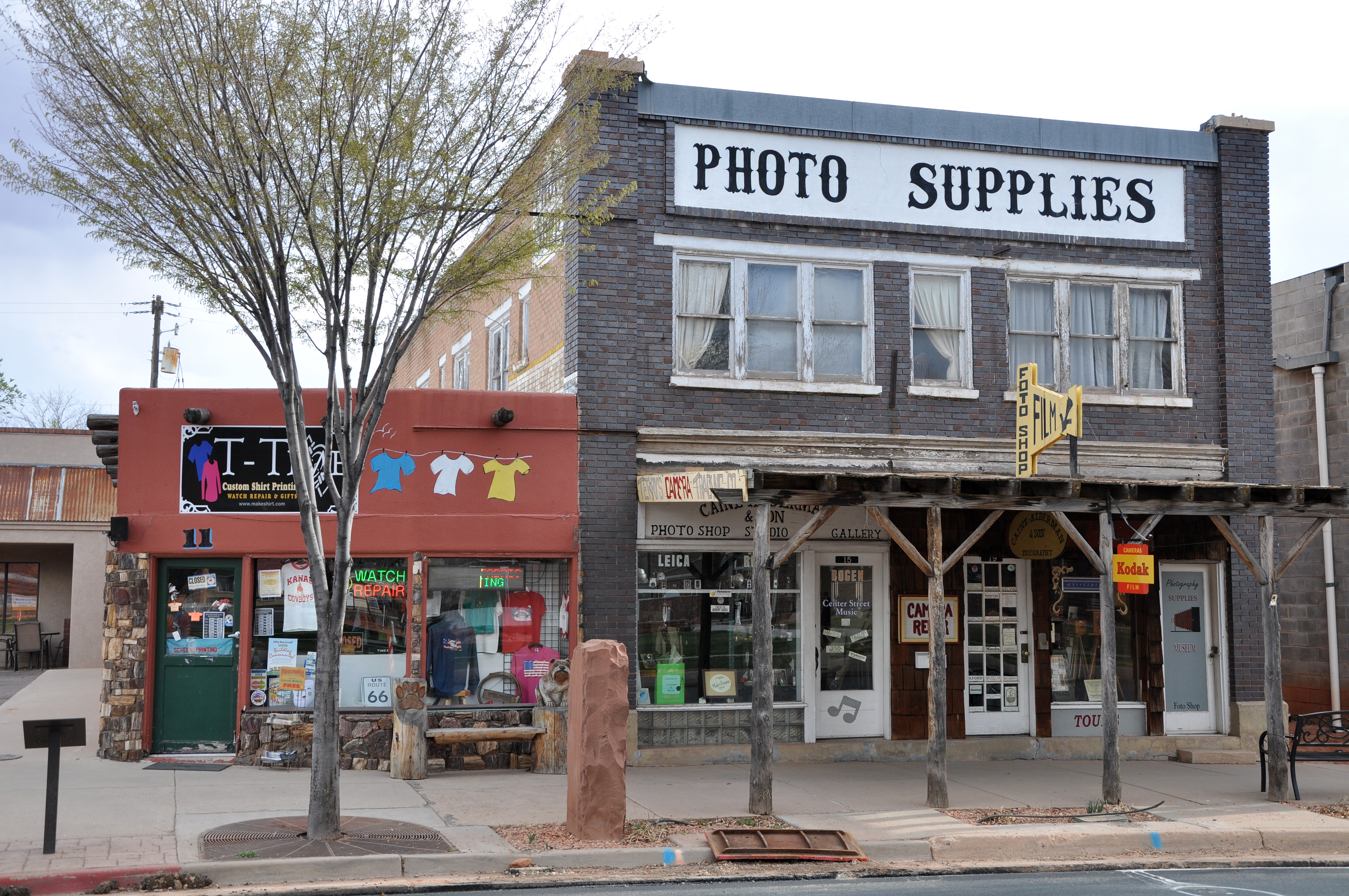

- Location within Utah Location within the United States
- Location: 19 W. Center St., Kanab, Utah
- Coordinates: 37°02′52″N 112°31′42″W
- Area: less than one acre
- Built: 1929, 1958
- Architectural style: Early Commercial
- MPS: Kanab, Utah MPS
- NRHP reference No.: 03000152
- Added to NRHP: August 14, 2003

The Kanab Hotel and Cafe, located at 19 W. Center St. in Kanab, Utah, was built in 1929. It was listed on the National Register of Historic Places in 2003, by which time it had also been known as Virge's Kanab Hotel, Cafe and Bakery.

It is a brick two-part commercial block building on a concrete foundation, with a flat roof behind a "cascading" parapet. It has one-story later additions on its north and east sides.
