= Boulder Elementary School =

- U.S. National Register of Historic Places
- Location within Utah Location within the United States
- Location: 351 N 100 E, off UT 51, Boulder, Utah
- Coordinates: 37.908898°N 111.423699°W
- Area: 3.9 acres (1.6 ha)
- Built: 1935-36
- Built by: Arthur McInelly, Sr.
- Architectural style: PWA Moderne
- MPS: Public Works Buildings TR
- NRHP reference No.: 85000805
- Added to NRHP: April 1, 1985

The Boulder Elementary School, at 351 N 100 E in Boulder, Utah, is a PWA Moderne-style school completed in 1936. The builder was Arthur McInelly, Sr., and the designer is not known. It was listed on the National Register of Historic Places in 1985.

It is a one-story building built as a Works Progress Administration project during 1935–36. It was designed with a mix of PWA Moderne and classical elements. Its nomination describes it as having a front entrance porch with classical elements including "cornice returns, a pedimented head over the recessed doorway, and a transom above the door itself. The formality of the porch is broken by a zig-zag belt course that circles the building and gives it a sense of the abstract geometric quality associated with the moderne movement."

It is currently the Boulder Town Office.
