= Bryce Canyon campground comfort stations =

- Loop C Comfort Station, Loop D Comfort Station
- U.S. National Register of Historic Places
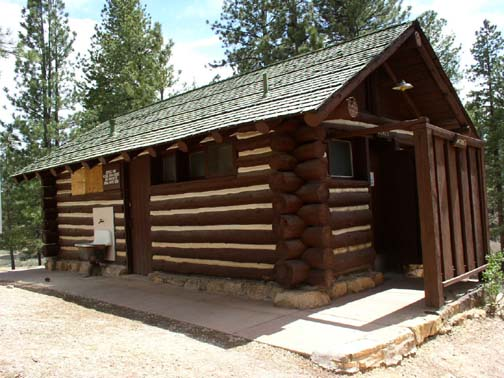
- Loop C comfort station

- Location within Utah Location within the United States
- Nearest city: Bryce Canyon, Utah
- Coordinates: 37°38′7″N 112°9′56″W
- Area: less than one acre
- Built: 1934
- Built by: Civilian Conservation Corps
- Architect: National Park Service
- Architectural style: NPS Rustic
- MPS: Bryce Canyon National Park MPS
- NRHP reference No.: 95000428, 95000429
- Added to NRHP: April 25, 1995

The Loop C Comfort Station and the Loop D Comfort Station are public toilet facilities in Bryce Canyon National Park's North Campground, individually listed on the National Register of Historic Places in 1995 for their significance as structures relating to the park's administrative infrastructure, and for their integrity as examples of rustic architecture. The National Park Service rustic style structures were built in 1935 as part of the first planned campground in the park by Civilian Conservation Corps labor. Plans were developed by the National Park Service Branch of Plans and Designs. Similar facilities in Loops A and B were not built until the 1950s.

The comfort stations are rectangular log buildings of one story. The logs are saddle-notched. The interior has separate facilities for men and women, separated by a utility room. The gable roof is covered with wood shakes. Rafter ends are exposed. The original chopper-cut log ends have been cut down flat.

The comfort stations were individually listed on the National Register of Historic Places on April 25, 1995. The entire campground was considered for eligibility, but retains little historic integrity apart from the two comfort stations.
