= Utah Parks Company =

The Utah Parks Company, a subsidiary of Union Pacific Railroad, owned and operated restaurants, lodging, and bus tours in Bryce Canyon and Zion National Parks, the north rim of Grand Canyon National Park, and Cedar Breaks National Monument from the 1920s until 1972. Operating as a concessionaire of the National Park Service, the company operated from a base in Cedar City, Utah. The company's bus tours connected there with Union Pacific trains as well as tour buses from Los Angeles, San Francisco and other west coast cities, and offered a loop tour of the region's parks and monuments, escorted by a Utah Parks Company driver/guide.

== History ==
Shortly after the National Park Service was created through the 1916 Organic Act, the brothers Gronway and Chauncey Perry applied for a transportation concession to take tourists from Cedar City to Mukuntuweap National Monument (later Zion National Park), incorporating as the National Park Transportation and Camping Company with William Wylie in 1917. The Parry brothers had previously operated a shuttle service from the Los Angeles and Salt Lake Railroad to St. George, Utah which started in 1915; the new transportation concession operated with a fleet of used vehicles: one seven-passenger Hudson, a Ford Model T, and three Cadillacs. The shoestring operation was run entirely by the two brothers, who were often so busy running the company they enlisted their younger brother, Whit, to drive tourists when he was just 13 years old. When the United States entered World War I, the two older brothers joined the Army and turned over their proxies in the company to Wylie; upon their return in 1920, they discovered that Wylie had forced them out. After a court battle, Chauncey Perry and Wylie reconciled and restarted the company in 1921, now renamed to the Utah—Grand Canyon Transportation Company since they now provided trips to the Grand Canyon as well. After Wylie left the company, Chauncey invited Gronway to rejoin and Chauncey served as a guide during President Warren Harding's trip to Zion in 1923.

Locations along the Grand Loop Tour
1 Cedar City, Utah
2 Zion National Park
3 Grand Canyon National Park, Grand Canyon Lodge, North Rim
4 Bryce Canyon National Park
5 Cedar Breaks National Monument

Union Pacific acquired the Los Angeles & Salt Lake in 1921 and extended a branch of the line from Lund to Cedar City in 1923, incorporating its Utah Parks Company subsidiary that year; the railroad-backed company bought out the Parry brothers in 1926 and installed them as company superintendents. The typical route to Zion from the southwest was a dead-end at the time; tourists going in were forced to take the same way out until the Zion – Mount Carmel Highway and Tunnel was completed in 1930. The tunnel was not initiated until it was apparent that Bryce Canyon would be added to the National Park System. After it was completed, the Utah Parks Company set up the Grand Loop or Grand Circle Tour for tourists taking buses through Zion, Grand Canyon, Bryce Canyon, and Cedar Breaks. The tunnel cut travel time to Bryce Canyon by half and reduced the distance from 149 to 88 miles (240 to 142 km). After 1936, bus tours were offered on the National Parks-standard White Model 706.

As the twentieth century progressed, railroad passenger traffic declined and the Union Pacific's interest in supporting National Park tourism correspondingly lessened. The railroad ended passenger train service to Cedar City in 1960, and in 1972 the Union Pacific donated its concession-related infrastructure to the National Park Service. The facilities at Cedar Breaks were razed, as were some of the developments at Bryce and Zion, but the remaining lodge facilities remain in use today.

In March 2007, Xanterra Parks and Resorts took over the concession at the former Utah Parks Company locations. In March 2014, the concession inside Bryce Canyon National Park was taken over by Forever Resorts.

To promote travel in the region, including other national parks in neighboring states, the Grand Circle Association, a not-for-profit coalition of businesses and destinations, was founded in 1983.

== Properties ==
The Utah Parks Company constructed rustic-style, stone-and-log lodges at each of the Park Service locations it served. Most of the major buildings were designed by Gilbert Stanley Underwood, a noted period architect. (Underwood also designed the Ahwahnee Hotel (1925) in Yosemite National Park, and Jackson Lake Lodge in Grand Teton National Park.) Underwood's surviving Utah Parks Company buildings are considered exceptional examples of the Rustic style of architecture, and are listed on the National Register of Historic Places.

The company also owned the landmark El Escalante Hotel in Cedar City where visitors intending to take the park loop on a Utah Parks Company bus were required to stay their first night in Cedar City, which became known as the "Gateway to the Parks". The venerable El Escalante was especially well known to escorts in the 1960s, many from Greyhound Bus Lines, arriving via bus for a tour of the Parks. With up to 39 travelers per tour, the groups took over the El Escalante, which offered only 23 rooms, and some were forced to share bathrooms. It was a common joke among escorts that if you could survive that first night at the El Escalante with a full tour, you could survive most anything.

== See also ==
- Utah Parks Company Service Station
