= Rider-Pugh House =

- U.S. National Register of Historic Places
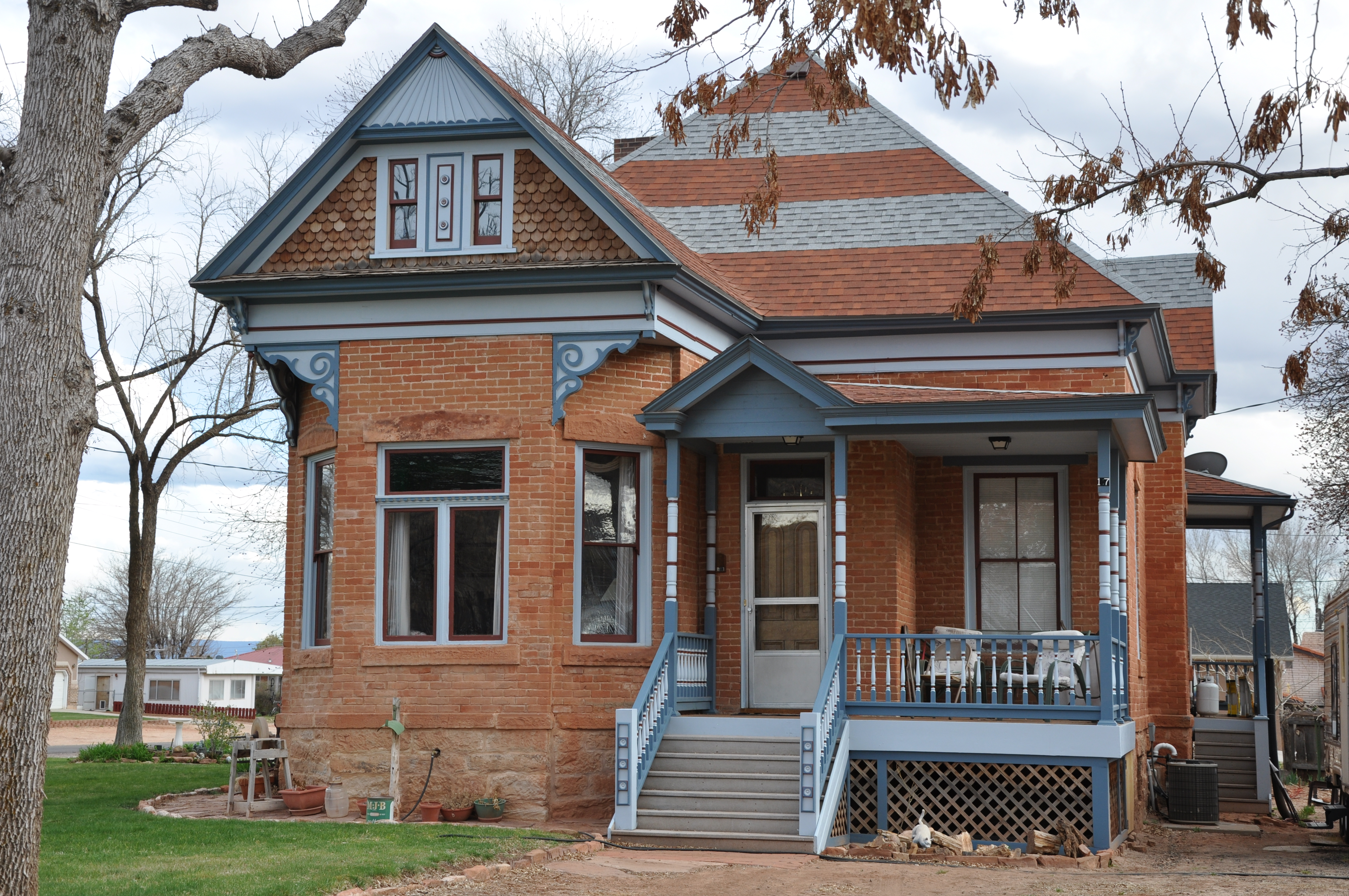
- The house in 2013

- Location within Utah Location within the United States
- Location: 17 West 100 South, Kanab, Utah
- Coordinates: 37°02′49″N 112°31′42″W
- Area: 0.3 acres (0.12 ha)
- Built: 1892
- Built by: John and Frank Rider
- Architectural style: Late Victorian, Central block projecting bay
- MPS: Kanab, Utah MPS
- NRHP reference No.: 01000316
- Added to NRHP: April 6, 2001

The Rider-Pugh House is a historic house in Kanab, Utah. It was built in 1892-1894 by John Rider, an immigrant from Ireland who converted to the Church of Jesus Christ of Latter-day Saints in 1855 and settled in Utah in 1886. He was assisted by his son, Frank Rider. Rider initially lived near Salt Lake City with his wife, née Mary McDonald, and their two children. He moved to a fort in Kanab in 1870, and he purchased the plot of land upon which this house was built in 1889. The house designed in the Late Victorian style. Underneath the foyer, there is a "polygamy pit". In 1895, the house was acquired by Edward Pugh, an immigrant from England who also converted to the LDS Church and arrived in the United States in 1844. Pugh had two wives, Mary Ann Rock Williams and Elizabeth Kelly, although his first wife lived in Salt Lake City. The house was deeded to their daughter, Pearl Edna Pugh Brown, in 1914. It has been listed on the National Register of Historic Places since April 6, 2001.
