= Rainbow Point Comfort Station and Overlook Shelter =

- U.S. National Register of Historic Places
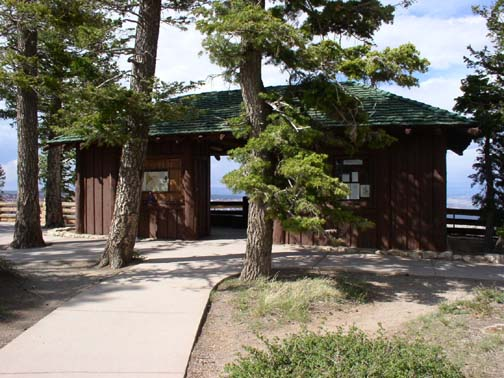
- Rainbow Point Shelter

- Location within Utah Location within the United States
- Location: Bryce Canyon National Park, Kane County, Utah
- Nearest city: Bryce Canyon, Utah
- Coordinates: 37°28′31″N 112°14′21″W
- Built: 1940
- Architect: NPS
- Architectural style: NPS "Exaggerated" Rustic
- MPS: Bryce Canyon National Park MPS
- NRHP reference No.: 95000427
- Added to NRHP: April 25, 1995

The Rainbow Point Comfort Station and Overlook Shelter in Bryce Canyon National Park, Utah were designed in 1939 by A.V. Jory of the National Park Service Branch of Plans and Designs in the National Park Service Rustic style. Located at the southern end of the Rim Road at Rainbow Point, the buildings were built by the Civilian Conservation Corps in 1940.

The "comfort station", otherwise known as a public toilet, is set back from the rim of Bryce Canyon. The comfort station is designed in the "logs-out" style, sheathed in V-joint wood shiplap siding, with half-round logs covering the joints. The roof is framed with log rafters. The shelter is located directly on the edge of the canyon, facing outwards. The shelter uses massive vertical log posts supporting a log-framed roof. Vertical board siding is used as an infill on the rear half, which is open to the canyon on the front. Siding encloses two small storage areas behind the main interpretive displays.
