= Bryce Canyon Lodge Historic District =

Historic district in Utah, United States

- Bryce Canyon Lodge Historic District (Boundary Increase)
- U.S. National Register of Historic Places
- U.S. Historic district
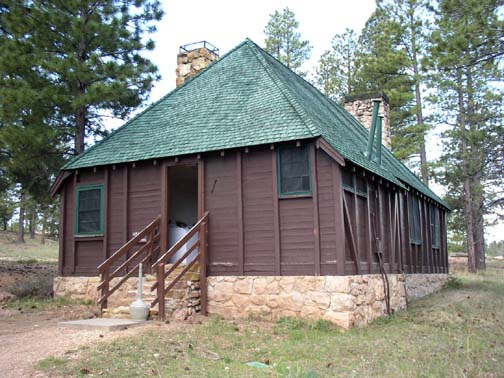
- Recreation hall

- Location within Utah Location within the United States
- Nearest city: Bryce Canyon, Utah
- Coordinates: 37°37′35″N 112°10′06″W
- Area: 9.5 acres (3.8 ha)
- Built: 1924
- Architect: Gilbert Stanley Underwood (lodge)
- Architectural style: rustic
- MPS: Bryce Canyon National Park MPS
- NRHP reference No.: 95000434
- Added to NRHP: April 25, 1995

The Bryce Canyon Lodge Historic District surrounds and includes the Bryce Canyon Lodge in Bryce Canyon National Park, as well as the survivors of a large complex of buildings that comprised the core of the park's visitor services area in the 1930s.

== Lodge and cabins ==
The complex is located near the edge of the Paunsaugunt Plateau in the northern end of the park, centered on the Bryce Canyon Lodge, designed by architect Gilbert Stanley Underwood. The National Historic Landmark district includes the Lodge and fifteen so-called "Deluxe Cabins," the survivors of a complex that included more than sixty cabins and service structures surrounding the Lodge.

== Historic district ==
The historic district, which was expanded from the original National Historic Landmark district in 1995, includes service structures and a greater portion of the wooded landscape around the main Lodge. Buildings in the historic district include a recreation hall, a dormitory for employees, a pump house, a linen house, and the remaining six standard cabins.

== Description ==
The dormitory, the only structure in the complex that was not designed by Underwood's office, was designed in a compatible style by the Office of the Chief Engineer of the Utah Parks Company and reviewed by the Park Service. Built between 1937 and 1938, the one-story building is a "studs-out" structure linke others in the neighborhood, with sheathing mailed to the inside face of the building's frame, leaving the frame exposed to the outside. Unlike other stud-out structures in the neighborhood, the dormitory lacks diagonal framing members. The building has a hipped roof. A porch on the north side shelters the main entry. The east and west elevations also have entry doors. The interior comprises a central hallway with accommodations to either side. A former recreation room has been converted to additional dormitory space. The remodeled interior does not contribute to the building's significance.

The recreation hall, also known as the girl's dormitory, was built about 1927. The one-story frame studs-out structure is covered with a hipped roof. The interior is divided into three major rooms, the largest of which is a recreation room with a large stone fireplace. The interior has not been extensively remodeled, and contributes to the building's significance.

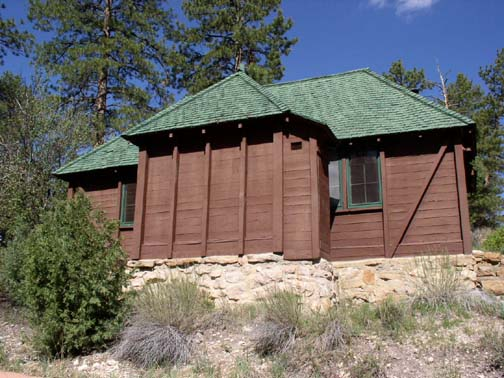
Standard cabin

The pumphouse is built similarly to the deluxe cabins, with vertical log framing, and is believed to have been designed at about the same time. The small rectangular building has a gable roof. It has two rooms divided from each other by a stone wall. One room contains a pump, and the other is a storage area. The sheathing and wood roof rafters are exposed to the interior. The linen house is nearby. A studs-out building, it is believed to have been built at about the same time as the standard cabins. The building is filled with shelves and is used for linen storage. The interior is liberally covered with graffiti left there by concessions employees, the earliest dating to the 1950s.

There are six standard cabins remaining, all built about 1925. All are one-story studs-out structures with hipped roofs. The shingles are applied in a wavy pattern similar to that of the main lodge. Bathrooms and possibly ceilings were added to the cabins in 1940-41. The cabins stand between the lodge and the deluxe cabins, with the pump house and linen house at the farthest end. All, including the two utility structures, were designed by Underwood.

The district was established through the expansion of the district encompassing the Bryce Canyon Lodge and deluxe cabins, but unlike the original district, is not a National Historic Landmark District. The expansion took place on April 25, 1995.
