= Horse Barn (Bryce Canyon, Utah) =

- U.S. National Register of Historic Places
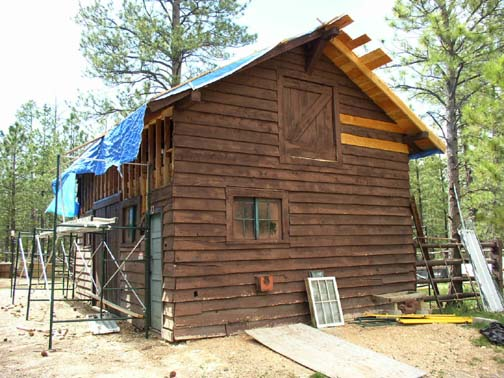
- Horse barn under restoration

- Location within Utah Location within the United States
- Nearest city: Bryce Canyon, Utah
- Coordinates: 37°37′35″N 112°10′53″W
- Area: less than one acre
- Built: 1929
- Built by: National Park Service
- Architect: National Park Service
- Architectural style: NPS Rustic
- MPS: Bryce Canyon National Park MPS
- NRHP reference No.: 95000433
- Added to NRHP: April 25, 1995

The Horse Barn at Bryce Canyon National Park, Utah, is a rustic structure built in 1929, shortly after the National Park Service assumed control of the new park lands from the U.S. Forest Service. The Park Service set about improving facilities in the park, using a design by the Park Service Branch of Plans and Designs. It is listed on the National Register of Historic Places as an example of NPS design work of the late 1920s.

The barn measures about 18 by 21.5 feet (5.5 by 6.6 m). The wood-frame building is covered in 12 inches (300 mm) weatherboards and rests on a concrete slab. The west side features a board-and-batten entry door with a small vision light. with a four-by-four light sliding window on the main level and a four-light hopper window in the gable. The east side includes a four-by-four light sliding window on the main level and a board-and-batten door for hay in the gable. The south side includes board doors flanked by four-by-four sliding windows and a paneled entry door at the south end. The interior of the barn has been converted to a mechanic's shop. It consists of two small rooms and one large room, with board wall finishes in the small rooms and gypsum wallboard finish in the larger room. The barn has been moved from its original location to a small collection of NPS and Utah Parks Company structures that were moved to the site from the 1950s. The original site was close to the present Old National Park Service Housing Historic District.

The barn was listed on the National Register of Historic Places on April 25, 1995.
