= Bryce Canyon Lodge =

- Bryce Canyon Lodge and Deluxe Cabins
- U.S. National Register of Historic Places
- U.S. National Historic Landmark
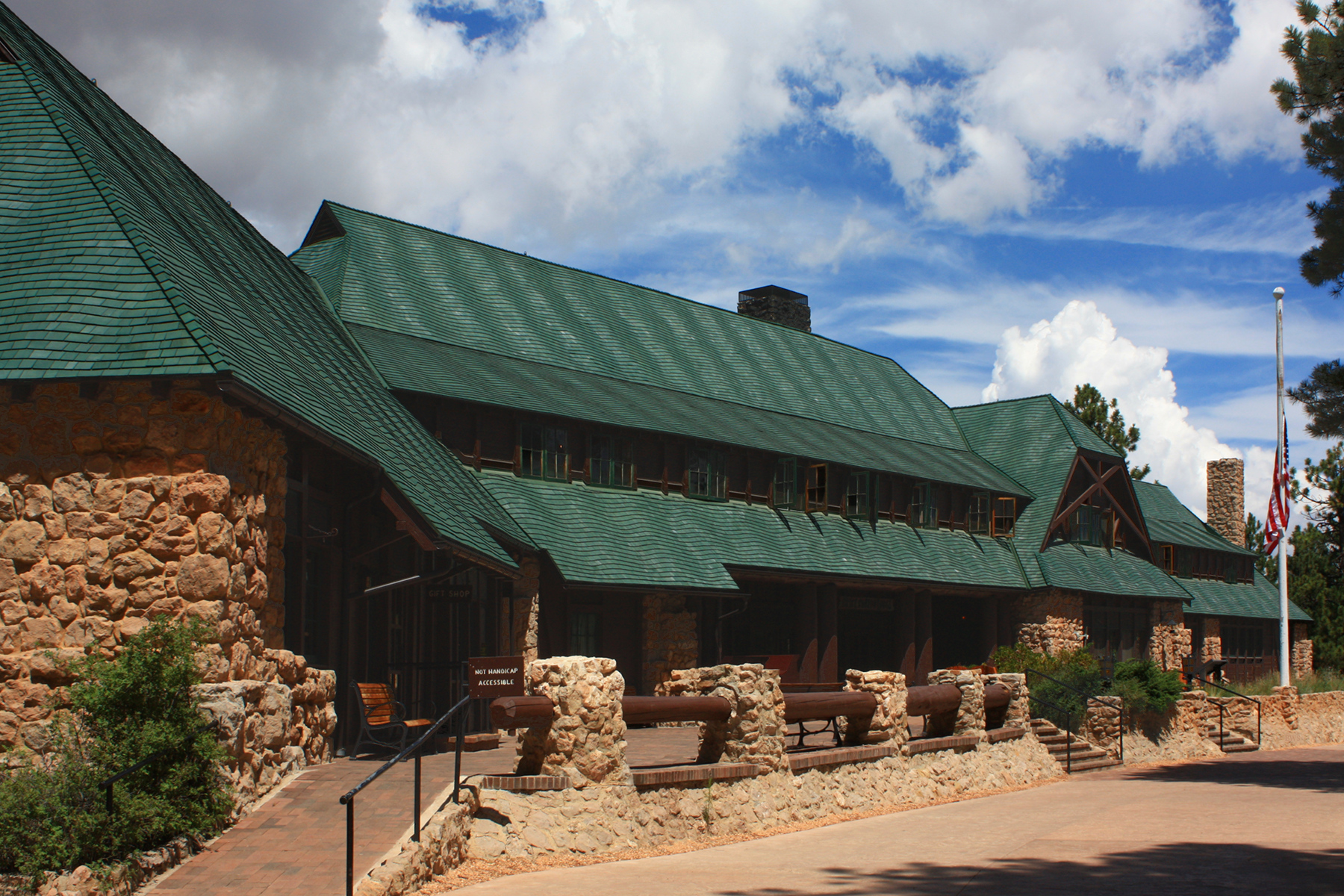
- Bryce Canyon Lodge

- Location within Utah Location within the United States
- Location: Bryce Canyon National Park, Utah
- Coordinates: 37°37′37″N 112°10′2″W
- Built: 1925
- Architect: Gilbert S. Underwood
- Architectural style: National Park Service Rustic
- MPS: Bryce Canyon National Park MPS
- NRHP reference No.: 87001339 (NHL), 95000434 (HD boundary increase)

Significant dates
- Added to NRHP: May 28, 1987 (NHL), April 25, 1995 (HD boundary increase)
- Designated NHL: May 28, 1987

Bryce Canyon Lodge is a lodging facility in Bryce Canyon National Park, Utah, United States, built between 1924 and 1925 using local materials. Designed by architect Gilbert Stanley Underwood, the lodge is an excellent example of National Park Service rustic design, and the only remaining completely original structure that Underwood designed for Bryce Canyon National Park, Zion National Park, and the North Rim of the Grand Canyon.

== Description ==
The two-story lodge is built on a stone base with intentionally oversized log framing, creating a massive, rustic appearance. The central portion of the building dates to 1924, with the addition of the north and southeast wings taking place in 1926. The lodge is entered by a long porch fronting the entire lobby, whose roof rests on a 52-foot (16 m) long log beam supported by paired log columns. The lodge is capped by a heavy, steeply pitched shingled roof with clipped gables and shed dormers.

The main floor of the lodge comprises the lobby, a dining room, a small auditorium, a gift shop, kitchen and administrative and utility spaces. The dining room and auditorium are open to the roof with exposed log trusses. The lobby features milled timbers with Arts and Crafts detailing. Fireplaces of rough rubble stone are found in the lobby, where the firebox is constructed in a pointed arch, and in the auditorium. A basement underlies much of the main level.

The lodge's roof is notable for its unusual shingling pattern, originally designed by Underwood, in which the lower edges of the horizontal shingle courses form irregular, undulating moiré or wave-like patterns across the roof. This creates an optical illusion that the roof is warped, or in motion. This unique shingling pattern is on the original cabins as well as the main lodge buildings, and has been replicated with each re-roofing of the complex, using the original pattern, as a way to keep the craftsman's trademarks of the original builders and Underwood's design.

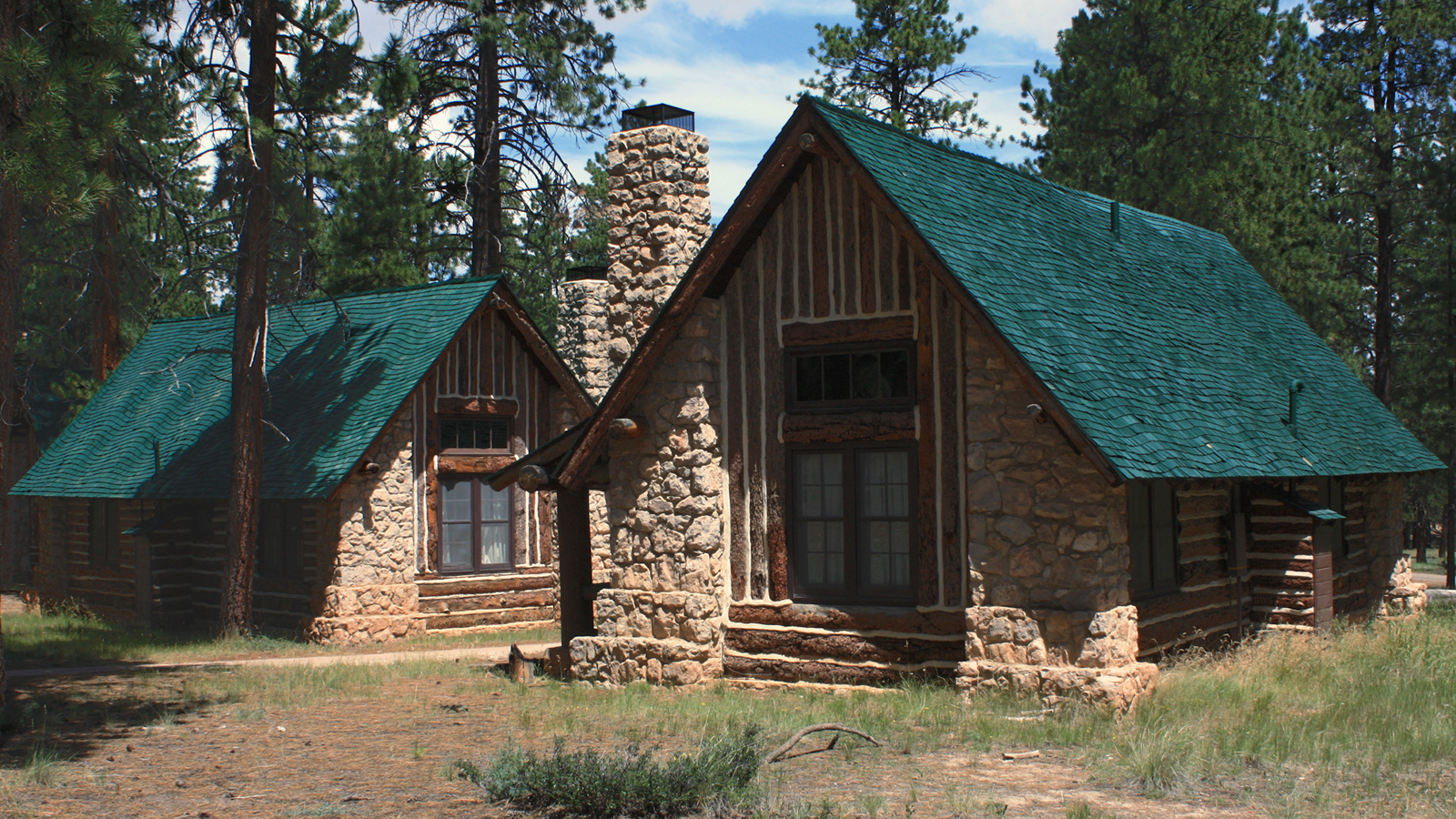
Deluxe cabins, July 2016

=== Deluxe cabins ===
The satellite cabins, called deluxe cabins, are to the southeast of the lodge. Five buildings contain four lodging units, and ten contain two. The cabins have rubble stone chimneys and corner pilasters, with log slab siding on the main wall exposures, simulating full log construction, complete with chinking. The cabins have log-framed porches with log railings. On the interior the roof trusses are exposed. Original paneling complements the stone fireplaces. The area formerly included two other lines of cabins, the budget cabins and standard cabins, since removed.

== History ==
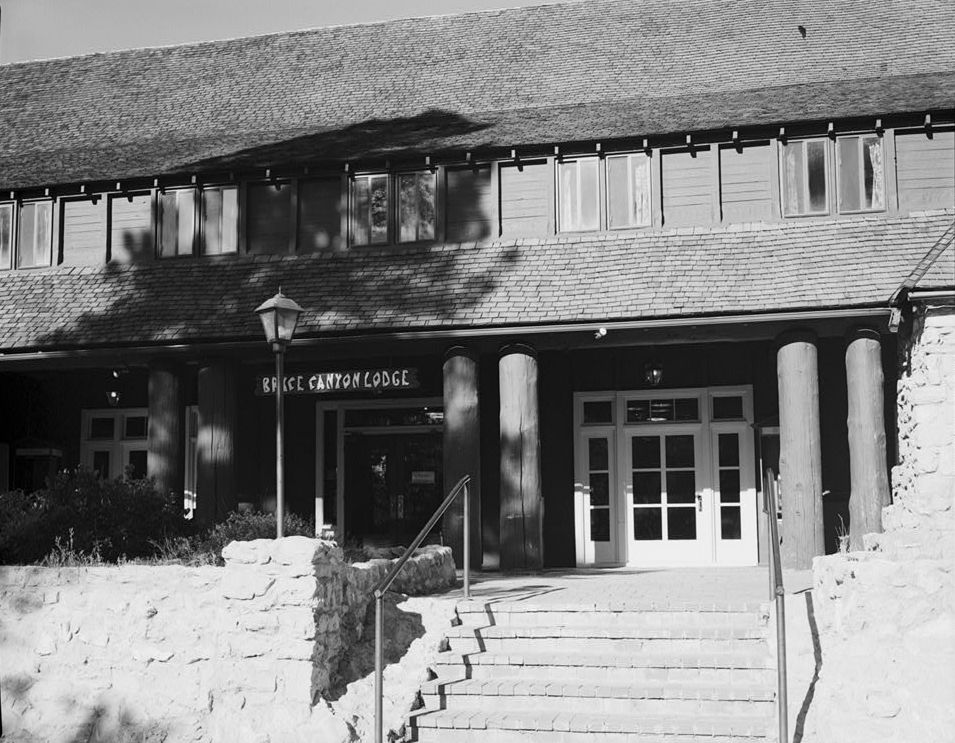
Lodge's front entrance, facing east, offset view showing doors

The Bryce Canyon Lodge was built by the Utah Parks Company, a subsidiary of the Union Pacific Railroad, and opened by T. E. Fitzgerald, a noted hotel manager in the region. The lodge was part of the railroad's project to develop tourist traffic to Bryce, Zion, and the Grand Canyon by providing noteworthy destination hotels at each park. The Union Pacific was following in the footsteps of other railroads' efforts to promote the western parks of the United States and Canada. Architect Gilbert Stanley Underwood was in charge of the design work for the Union Pacific hotels. Construction at the Bryce Canyon Lodge started in 1924 and was completed in the early summer of 1925. The guest wings were added in 1926 and the auditorium in 1927. The second floor of the lodge was used as the dormitory for women employees of the lodge. The budget and economy cabins, also designed by Underwood, were mostly built in 1927, with five deluxe cabins. Ten more deluxe cabins were completed by 1929.

Bryce Canyon Lodge is operated by Aramark, a park-management company selected and contracted by the National Park Service. The lodge and cabins were declared a National Historic Landmark (NHL) on May 28, 1987 under the name "Bryce Canyon Lodge and Deluxe Cabins." The historic district was expanded on April 25, 1995, as the Bryce Canyon Lodge Historic District which encompasses the National Historic Landmark District but is not itself an NHL.

== See also ==
- List of National Historic Landmarks in Utah
- National Register of Historic Places listings in Garfield County, Utah
