= List of National Historic Landmarks in Utah =

This is a complete List of National Historic Landmarks in Utah. The United States National Historic Landmark program is operated under the auspices of the National Park Service, and recognizes structures, districts, objects, and similar resources according to a list of criteria of national significance. The state of Utah is home to 14 of these landmarks, tying together a wide range of historic threads.

The table below lists all 14 of these sites, along with added detail and description.

== Key ==
	National Historic Landmark
^{†}	National Historic Landmark District
^{#}	National Historic Site, National Historical Park, National Memorial, or National Monument
^{*}	Delisted Landmark

== List ==
	Landmark name	Image	Date designated	Location	County	Description
1^{†}	Alkali Ridge	Alkali Ridge	July 19, 1964 (#66000740)	near Blanding	San Juan	A set of widely-scattered archaeological remains of the earliest forms of Puebloan architecture, representing a period of transition from scattered, pit-style dwellings to a settled agricultural lifestyle. These multi-story buildings and kivas have yielded high-quality ceramics, and form the type location for the Pueblo II period (c. 10th century – c. 11th century). Landmark area is shown in red on map.
2	Bingham Canyon Open Pit Copper not Mine	Bingham Canyon Open Pit Copper not Mine	November 13, 1966 (#66000736)	Oquirrh Mountains; 40°31′20″N 112°08′58″W	Salt Lake	The world's first and largest open-pit copper mine, Bingham Canyon was opened in 1904.
3	Bryce Canyon Lodge and Deluxe Cabins	Bryce Canyon Lodge and Deluxe Cabins	May 28, 1987 (#87001339)	Bryce Canyon National Park; 37°37′34″N 112°10′00″W	Garfield	The Union Pacific Railroad built this national park lodge in 1924–1927. The architectural style was used by railroads for lodges across the American west with the encouragement of the National Park Service.
4	Central Utah Relocation Center (Topaz)	Central Utah Relocation Center (Topaz)	March 29, 2007 (#07000432)	near Delta; 39°24′40″N 112°46′20″W	Millard	One of 10 relocation centers for internment of Japanese Americans during World War II. The internees were mostly from northern California and the San Francisco Bay Area, and included many professional artists.
5	Danger Cave	Danger Cave	January 20, 1961 (#66000741)	near Wendover; 40°45′07″N 114°00′57″W	Tooele	
6	Desolation Canyon	Desolation Canyon	October 18, 1968 (#68000057)	on the Green River; 39°25′00″N 110°00′40″W	Carbon, Emery, Grand, and Uintah	This remote canyon on the Green River was traversed by John Wesley Powell in 1869. Powell's expedition was sponsored by the Smithsonian Institution.
7	Emigration Canyon	Emigration Canyon	January 20, 1961 (#66000737)	Salt Lake City; 40°46′00″N 111°46′00″W	Salt Lake	The Mormon pioneers traversed the Wasatch Range through this canyon at the western end of their trail, beginning in 1847. The canyon mouth is the location of Brigham Young's famous quotation "This is the place."
8^{†}	Fort Douglas	Fort Douglas	May 15, 1975 (#70000628)	Salt Lake City; 40°45′53″N 111°50′01″W	Salt Lake	This US Army post was established in the 1860s to uphold United States authority in the Mormon territories, and to protect overland transportation and communication lines.
9	Mountain Meadows Massacre Site	Mountain Meadows Massacre Site	June 23, 2011 (#11000562)	near Central; 37°28′32″N 113°38′37″W	Washington	Site of the 1857 massacre of California-bound pioneers by the Utah territorial militia.
10	Old City Hall	Old City Hall	May 15, 1975 (#71000846)	Salt Lake City; 40°46′26″N 111°53′12″W	Salt Lake	Completed in 1866, the city hall also served as the capitol of the Utah Territory, and was the scene of many tensions between Mormon leaders and the United States.
11	Quarry Visitor Center	Quarry Visitor Center	January 3, 2001 (#86003401)	Dinosaur National Monument; 40°26′25″N 109°18′05″W	Uintah	Built as part of the National Park Service's Mission 66 program of modern architectural design in the US national parks, this visitor center exemplifies the philosophy of locating visitor facilities immediately at the resource being interpreted. The building was closed due to structural damage from unstable soils in 2006, and extensive works, including construction of a new visitor center, were undertaken.
12	Reed O. Smoot House	Reed O. Smoot House	December 8, 1976 (#75001831)	Provo; 40°13′56″N 111°39′20″W	Utah	The home of Reed Smoot from 1892 to his death in 1941. Smoot was a prominent US Senator best known for advocacy of protectionism and the Hawley-Smoot Tariff.
13^{†}	Temple Square	Temple Square	January 29, 1964 (#66000738)	Salt Lake City; 40°46′12″N 111°53′34″W	Salt Lake	The earthly center of the Church of Jesus Christ of Latter-day Saints. Begun in the mid-19th century, the Square's Mormon landmarks include the Salt Lake Temple, the Tabernacle, and the Assembly Hall.
14^{†}	Brigham Young Complex	Brigham Young Complex	January 28, 1964 (#70000626)	Salt Lake City; 40°46′04″N 111°53′17″W	Salt Lake	The Beehive House and adjacent Lion House were the residence of Brigham Young from 1852 until his death in 1877. As President of the Church of Jesus Christ of Latter-day Saints at the time of the Mormon settlement of the Salt Lake Valley, Young and his home were pivotal in the development of the Church, Utah, and the American west.

== See also ==
- List of U.S. National Historic Landmarks by state
- National Register of Historic Places listings in Utah
- Historic preservation
- National Register of Historic Places
- History of Utah
