= Old National Park Service Housing Historic District =

Historic district in Utah, United States

- U.S. National Register of Historic Places
- U.S. Historic district
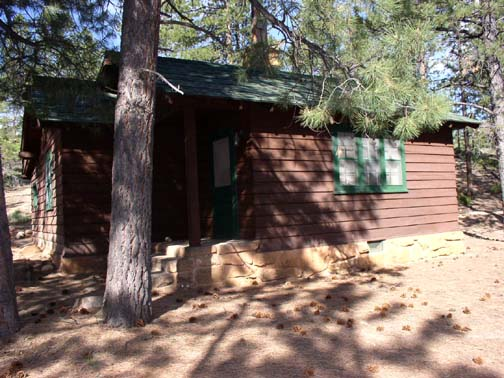

- Location within Utah Location within the United States
- Nearest city: Bryce Canyon, Utah
- Coordinates: 37°37′50″N 112°10′6″W
- Area: 10 acres (4.0 ha)
- Architect: NPS
- MPS: Bryce Canyon National Park MPS
- NRHP reference No.: 95000424
- Added to NRHP: April 25, 1995

The Old National Park Service Housing Historic District in Bryce Canyon National Park represents the first housing development within the park specifically designed to house National Park Service employees. Most of these units were intended for unmarried seasonal employees, and were small in scale. The majority were built between 1932 and 1936. Plans were developed by the Park Service Branch of Plans and Design. The district includes several cabins, a ranger dormitory, and a "wood vendor" structure.
