= Bryce Inn =

- U.S. National Register of Historic Places
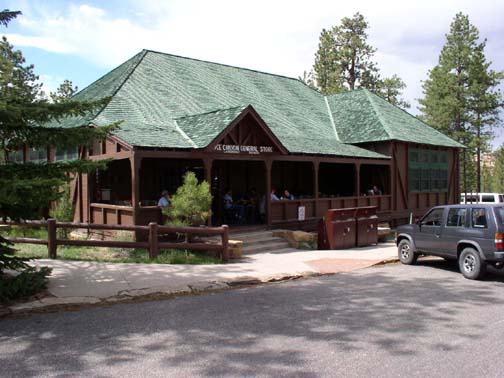

- Location within Utah Location within the United States
- Nearest city: Bryce Canyon, Utah
- Coordinates: 37°38′8″N 112°9′51″W
- Built: 1932
- Architect: Underwood, Gilbert Stanley
- Architectural style: NPS Rustic
- MPS: Bryce Canyon National Park MPS
- NRHP reference No.: 95000425
- Added to NRHP: April 25, 1995

The Bryce Inn, also known as the Bryce General Store, in Bryce Canyon National Park, Utah was designed by architect Gilbert Stanley Underwood and built in 1932. It was the last major building designed by Underwood for the Utah Parks Company. Designed in the National Park Service Rustic style, the Inn served as the center of a set of "housekeeping cabins" for park visitors, providing a cafeteria, laundry and vending facilities. However, the housekeeping cabins have since been removed, changing the Inn's relationship to its surroundings.

The one-story building has an irregular shape with a partly enclosed porch on the southeast side. Framing is in the "studs-out" style, with the 1 in × 6 in (25 mm × 152 mm) sheathing applied to the inside of the framing, emphasizing the framing as a decorative pattern on the exterior. The main entry is via the porch, through double doors. A new entry was built in 1973 on the southwest side that is accessible for the disabled. The building presently functions as a store and sells fast food items. This large room features exposed roof structure. Shower and laundry services are in an extension on the northwest side, with separate entries. A 1937 addition at the west end features an exterior stone chimney and a partial basement. The roof is a hipped structure with a wavy shingle pattern.

When the Inn was the center of the housekeeping camp area, providing dining and laundry services for tourists in the cabins. This development, consisting of at least 25 cabins, has since been removed, changing the building's relationship to its surroundings.

The Bryce Inn was placed on the National Register of Historic Places on April 25, 1995.
