= Under-the-Rim Trail =

- U.S. National Register of Historic Places
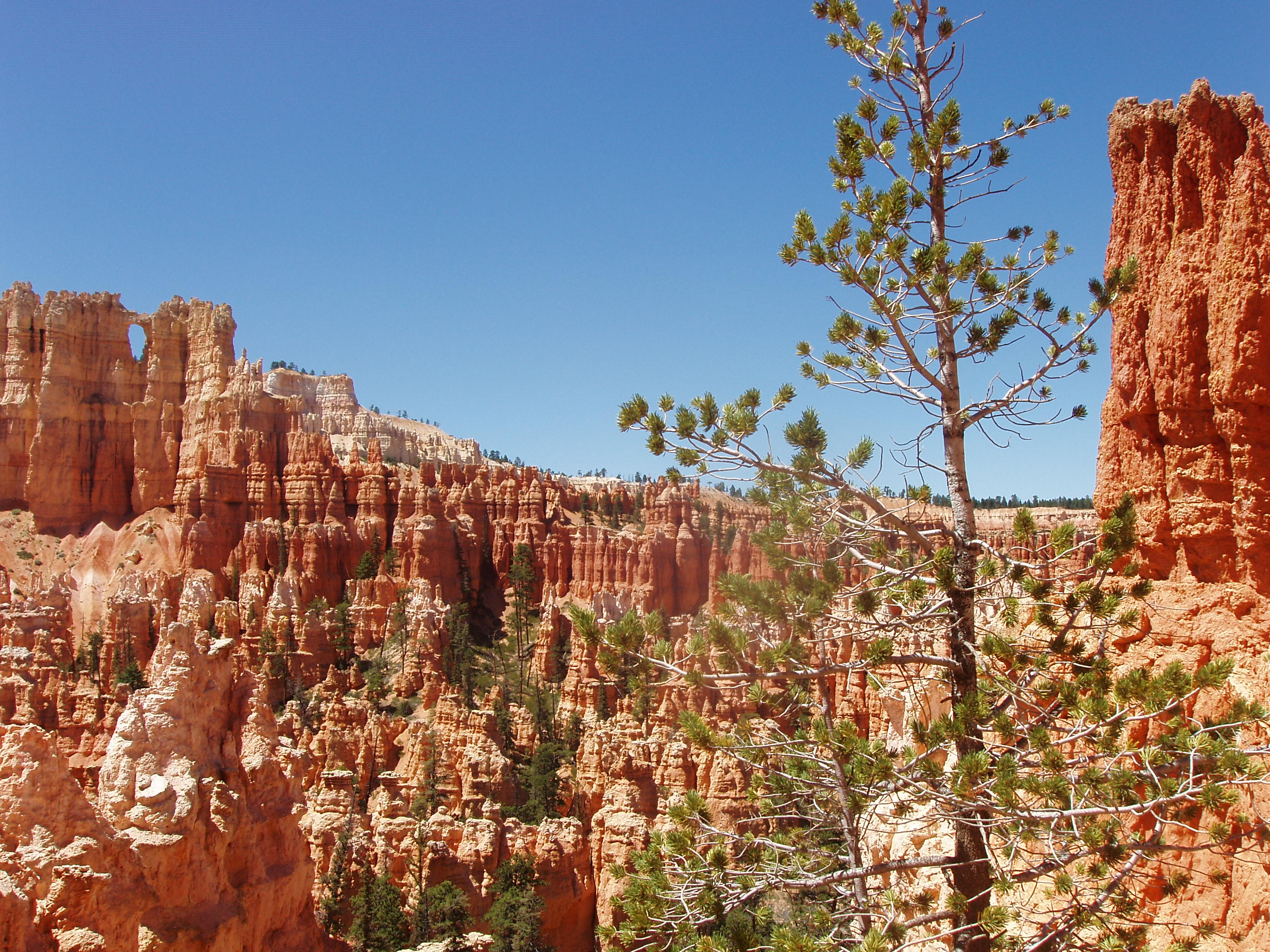

- Location within Utah Location within the United States
- Nearest city: Bryce Canyon, Utah
- Coordinates: 37°35′07″N 112°09′49″W
- Area: 93 acres (38 ha)
- Built: 1934
- Built by: National Park Service; Civilian Conservation Corps
- MPS: Bryce Canyon National Park MPS
- NRHP reference No.: 95000423
- Added to NRHP: April 25, 1995

The Under-the-Rim Trail is a 22.9-mile (36.9 km) hiking trail in Bryce Canyon National Park, Utah. The trail was established by the National Park Service to provide access to the portions of the park located below the rim of the Paunsaugunt Plateau, whose edge forms the eroded natural amphitheater for which the park is famous. Plans dating to 1932 proposed the trail so that wooded portions of the park's east side could be accessed, primarily for fire suppression activities rather than for access to scenic features. Work began on the trail in 1934, using Civilian Conservation Corps labor from CCC Camp NP-3, with work continuing into 1935.

Besides the main trail, the trail complex includes the Sheep Creek Connecting Trail, the Swamp Canyon Connecting Trail, the Whiteman Connecting Trail and the Agua Canyon Connecting Trail. The Sheep Creek Trail was a pre-existing roadway that was used for sheep drives. The total length of the trail complex is 32 miles (51 km) The trail descends from Bryce Point in the northern section of the park, moving first east and then south away from the amphitheaterat an average distance of about 1 kilometre (0.62 mi) from the edge of the plateau, ending at Rainbow Point. The trail features fewer of the park's famous hoodoos than day-hiking trails. Several campsites are located along its length.

The Under-the-Rim Trail and its branches, except for the Sheep Creek Trail, were listed on the National Register of Historic Places on August 25, 1995.

== See also ==
- Riggs Spring Fire Trail
