= Riggs Spring Fire Trail =

Trail in Bryce Canyon National Park, Utah, US

- U.S. National Register of Historic Places
- Location within Utah Location within the United States
- Nearest city: Bryce Canyon, Utah
- Coordinates: 37°27′51.5″N 112°13′53″W
- Area: 24 acres (9.7 ha)
- Built: 1936
- Built by: National Park Service; Civilian Conservation Corps
- MPS: Bryce Canyon National Park MPS
- NRHP reference No.: 95000431
- Added to NRHP: April 25, 1995

The Riggs Spring Fire Trail, also known as the Riggs Spring Loop Trail, was built in Bryce Canyon National Park in 1936 to provide access to the park's backcountry for fire suppression crews. The approximately 8-mile (13 km) trail is significant for its association with Civilian Conservation Corps labor from CCC Camp NP-3, and represents the last link in the series of access trails built in the mid-1930s, beginning with the Under-the-Rim Trail, also listed on the National Register of Historic Places. The trail descends eastward from Rainbow Point in the southern end of the park, descending along The Promontory, and turning back south, then west, then north to return to the road via Yovimpa Pass, ending at returning to Rainbow Point. The primary purpose of the trail was to provide reliable access to the backcountry of the southern portion of the park.

The Riggs Spring Fire Trail was placed on the National Register of Historic Places on April 25, 1995.
