= Bryce Canyon National Park =

National park in Utah, United States

- IUCN category II (national park)
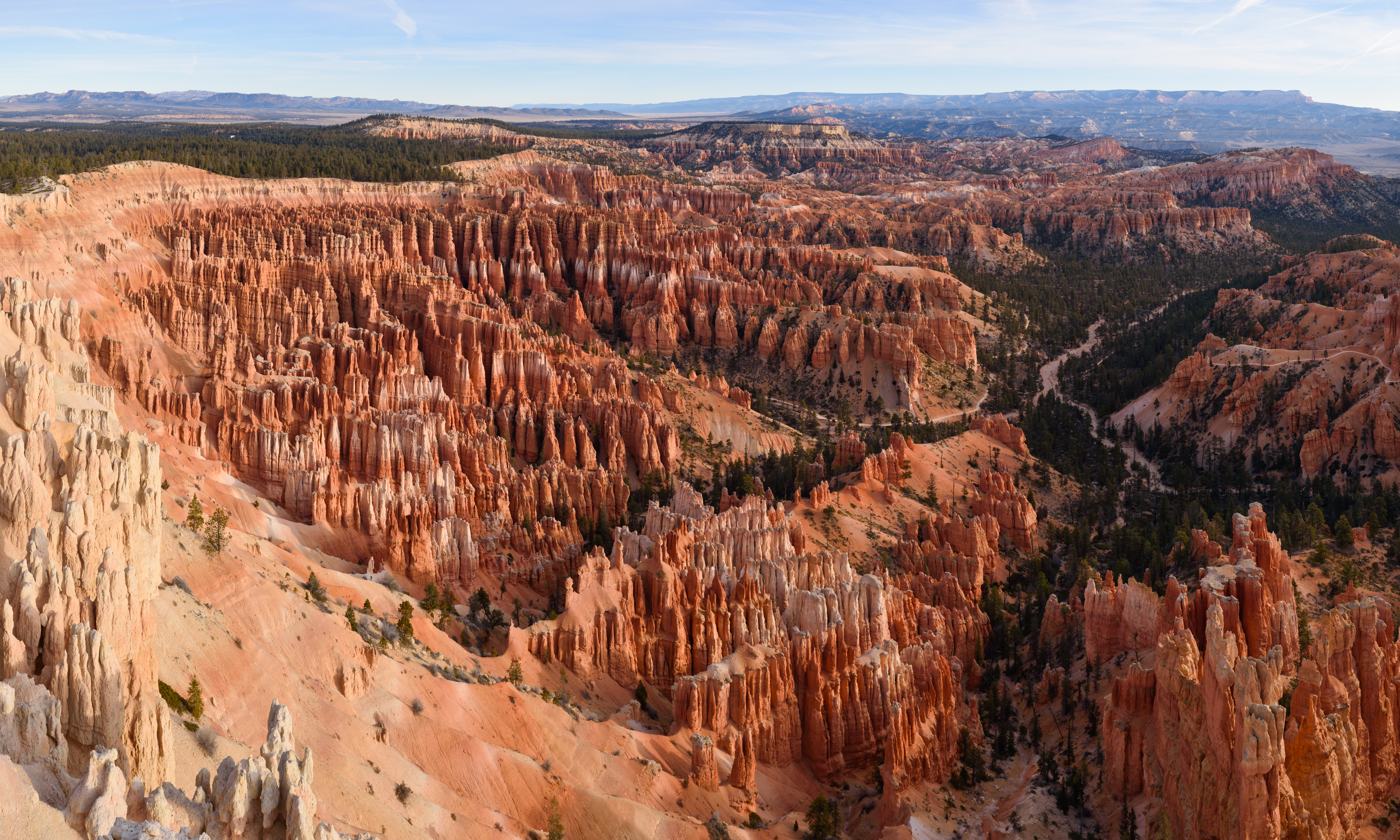
- Interactive map of Bryce Canyon National Park
- Location: Garfield County and Kane County, Utah, United States
- Nearest city: Tropic, Panguitch
- Coordinates: 37.64°N 112.17°W
- Area: 35,835 acres (145.02 km^{2})
- Established: February 25, 1928; 98 years ago
- Visitors: 2,498,075 (in 2024)
- Governing body: National Park Service
- Website: nps.gov/brca

Bryce Canyon National Park (/braɪs/) is a national park of the United States located in southwestern Utah. The major feature of the park is Bryce Canyon, which, despite its name, is not a canyon but a collection of giant natural amphitheaters along the eastern side of the Paunsaugunt Plateau. Bryce is distinctive due to geological structures called hoodoos, formed by frost weathering and stream erosion of the river and lake bed sedimentary rock. The red, orange, and white colors of the rocks provide distinctive views for park visitors. Bryce Canyon National Park is much smaller and sits at a much higher elevation than nearby Zion National Park. The rim at Bryce varies from 8,000 to 9,000 feet (2,400 to 2,700 m).

The area is in portions of Garfield County and Kane County. It was settled by Mormon pioneers in the 1850s and was named after Ebenezer Bryce, who homesteaded in the area in 1874. The area was originally designated as a national monument by President Warren G. Harding in 1923 and was redesignated as a national park by Congress in 1928. The park covers 35,835 acres (55.992 sq mi; 14,502 ha; 145.02 km^{2}) and receives substantially fewer visitors than Zion National Park (nearly 4.3 million in 2016) or Grand Canyon National Park (almost 6 million in 2016), largely due to Bryce's more remote location. In 2024, Bryce Canyon received almost 2.5 million visitors.

The park spans three life zones, with forests and meadows supporting diverse animal life. The park contains 1000 plant species, 59 mammal species, and at least 100 species of birds.

== Geography ==
The park covers 35,835 acres (14,502 ha) in southwestern Utah, at an altitude of 8,000 to 9,000 ft (2,400 to 2,700 m). The park is about 50 miles (80 km) northeast of and 1,000 feet (300 m) higher than Zion National Park.

Bryce Canyon National Park lies within the Colorado Plateau geographic province of North America and straddles the southeastern edge of the Paunsaugunt Plateau west of Paunsaugunt Faults (Paunsaugunt is Paiute for "home of the beaver"). Park visitors arrive at the plateau and look over its edge toward a valley containing the fault and the Paria River just beyond it (Paria is Paiute for "muddy or elk water"). The Kaiparowits Plateau is on the eastern opposite side of the valley.

Bryce Canyon was not formed from erosion initiated from a central stream, meaning it technically is not a canyon. Instead headward erosion excavated large amphitheater-shaped features in the Cenozoic-aged rocks of the Paunsaugunt Plateau. This erosion resulted in colorful pinnacles called hoodoos that are up to 200 feet (60 m) high. A series of amphitheaters extends more than 20 miles (30 km) north-to-south within the park. The largest is Bryce Amphitheater, which is 12 miles (19 km) long, 3 miles (5 km) wide and 800 feet (240 m) deep. A nearby example of amphitheaters with hoodoos in the same formation but at a higher elevation is in Cedar Breaks National Monument, which is 25 miles (40 km) to the west on the Markagunt Plateau.

Rainbow Point, the highest part of the park at 9,105 feet (2,775 m), is at the end of the 18-mile (29 km) scenic drive. From there, Aquarius Plateau, Bryce Amphitheater, the Henry Mountains, the Vermilion Cliffs and the White Cliffs can be seen. Yellow Creek, where it exits the park in the northeast section, is the lowest part of the park at 6,620 feet (2,020 m).

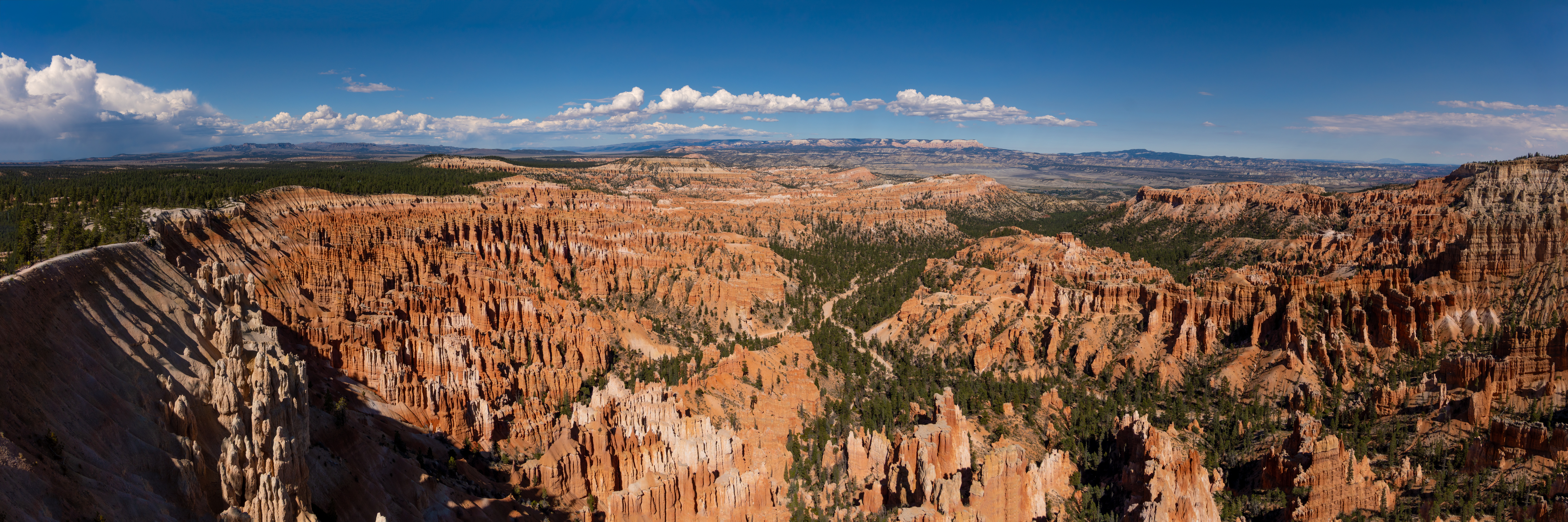
Bryce Amphitheater from Sunrise Point

== Climate ==
According to the Köppen climate classification system, the park has a continental climate with warm, dry summers (Dsb). Dsb climates are defined by having their coldest month at a mean temperature below 32 °F (0 °C), all months with a mean temperature below 71.6 °F (22 °C), at least four months with a mean temperature above 50 °F (10 °C), and three times as much precipitation in the wettest winter month compared to the driest summer month. The plant hardiness zone at the visitor center is 5b with an average annual extreme minimum air temperature of −10.0 °F (−23.3 °C).

The weather in Bryce Canyon is cooler and receives more precipitation than Zion: a total of 15 to 18 inches (380 to 460 mm) per year. Yearly temperatures vary from an average minimum of 9 °F (−13 °C) in January to an average maximum of 83 °F (28 °C) in July, but extreme temperatures can range from −30 to 97 °F (−34 to 36 °C). The record high temperature in the park was 98 °F (37 °C) in July 2002, while the record low temperature was −28 °F (−33 °C) in December 1972.

Climate data for Bryce Canyon National Park Headquarters, Utah, 1991–2020 normals, extremes 1959–present
Month	Jan	Feb	Mar	Apr	May	Jun	Jul	Aug	Sep	Oct	Nov	Dec	Year
Record high °F (°C)	59 (15)	64 (18)	75 (24)	75 (24)	85 (29)	95 (35)	98 (37)	90 (32)	89 (32)	80 (27)	68 (20)	60 (16)	98 (37)
Mean maximum °F (°C)	48.9 (9.4)	50.7 (10.4)	59.0 (15.0)	67.6 (19.8)	75.7 (24.3)	84.1 (28.9)	87.8 (31.0)	84.6 (29.2)	79.6 (26.4)	70.8 (21.6)	58.4 (14.7)	49.3 (9.6)	88.4 (31.3)
Mean daily maximum °F (°C)	36.9 (2.7)	38.8 (3.8)	45.8 (7.7)	53.5 (11.9)	63.1 (17.3)	75.1 (23.9)	80.0 (26.7)	77.5 (25.3)	70.1 (21.2)	58.2 (14.6)	45.8 (7.7)	36.8 (2.7)	56.8 (13.8)
Daily mean °F (°C)	26.9 (−2.8)	28.6 (−1.9)	34.5 (1.4)	41.2 (5.1)	49.9 (9.9)	59.8 (15.4)	66.0 (18.9)	63.7 (17.6)	55.9 (13.3)	45.0 (7.2)	34.3 (1.3)	26.9 (−2.8)	44.4 (6.9)
Mean daily minimum °F (°C)	17.0 (−8.3)	18.4 (−7.6)	23.3 (−4.8)	28.9 (−1.7)	36.6 (2.6)	44.6 (7.0)	52.1 (11.2)	50.0 (10.0)	41.6 (5.3)	31.9 (−0.1)	22.8 (−5.1)	17.0 (−8.3)	32.0 (0.0)
Mean minimum °F (°C)	−0.4 (−18.0)	1.1 (−17.2)	7.1 (−13.8)	15.5 (−9.2)	23.1 (−4.9)	31.0 (−0.6)	40.8 (4.9)	39.7 (4.3)	27.8 (−2.3)	18.4 (−7.6)	4.7 (−15.2)	−1.0 (−18.3)	−4.7 (−20.4)
Record low °F (°C)	−26 (−32)	−26 (−32)	−11 (−24)	−3 (−19)	13 (−11)	21 (−6)	28 (−2)	23 (−5)	16 (−9)	0 (−18)	−12 (−24)	−23 (−31)	−26 (−32)
Average precipitation inches (mm)	1.91 (49)	1.70 (43)	1.27 (32)	0.77 (20)	0.91 (23)	0.47 (12)	1.55 (39)	1.94 (49)	1.78 (45)	1.73 (44)	1.28 (33)	1.34 (34)	16.65 (423)
Average snowfall inches (cm)	19.8 (50)	18.1 (46)	13.2 (34)	5.9 (15)	1.5 (3.8)	0.2 (0.51)	0.0 (0.0)	0.0 (0.0)	0.0 (0.0)	3.0 (7.6)	9.7 (25)	15.3 (39)	86.7 (220)
Average precipitation days (≥ 0.01 in)	6.3	7.6	6.2	5.7	5.5	3.2	8.8	10.2	7.0	5.3	4.7	6.2	76.7
Average snowy days (≥ 0.1 in)	6.3	7.2	5.5	3.3	1.2	0.1	0.0	0.0	0.0	1.3	3.4	5.7	34.0
Mean monthly sunshine hours	217.0	226.0	248.0	300.0	341.0	360.0	341.0	310.0	300.0	279.0	210.0	186.0	3,318
Mean daily sunshine hours	7	8	8	10	11	12	11	10	10	9	7	6	9
Mean daily daylight hours	9.9	10.8	12.0	13.2	14.2	14.7	14.5	13.6	12.4	11.2	10.2	9.6	12.2
Percentage possible sunshine	71	74	67	76	77	82	76	74	81	80	69	63	74
Average ultraviolet index	2	4	6	8	10	11	11	10	8	5	3	2	7
Source 1: NOAA
Source 2: Weather Atlas (sun data)

== History ==
=== Native American habitation ===
Little is known about early human habitation in the area. Archaeological surveys of the Paunsaugunt Plateau indicate that people have lived in the area for at least 10,000 years. Basketmaker Anasazi artifacts thousands of years old were found south of the park. Other artifacts from the Pueblo-period Anasazi and the Fremont culture (up to the mid-12th century) were found.

The Paiute Native Americans moved into the area around the time that the other cultures left. These Native Americans hunted and gathered for most of their food, while supplementing their diet with cultivated plants. The Paiute developed a mythology surrounding the hoodoos. They believed that they were the Legend People whom the trickster Coyote turned to stone due to their bad deeds. One older Paiute said his culture called the hoodoos Anka-ku-was-a-wits, which is Paiute for "red painted faces".

=== European American exploration and settlement ===
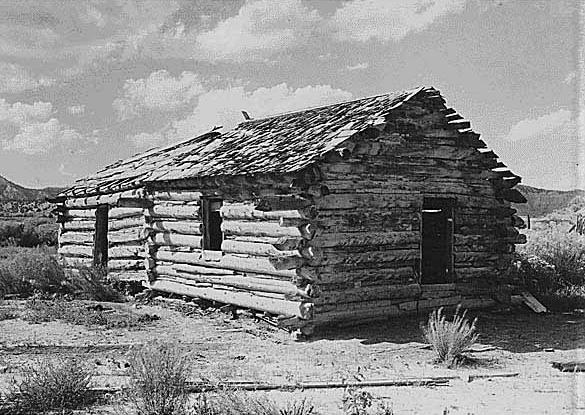
Ebenezer Bryce and his family lived in this cabin below Bryce Amphitheater (c. 1881).

In the late 18th and early 19th century the first European Americans explored the area. Mormon scouts visited in the 1850s to gauge its potential for agriculture, grazing, and settlement. The first major scientific expedition was led by U.S. Army Major John Wesley Powell in 1872. Powell, along with a team of mapmakers and geologists, surveyed the Sevier and Virgin River area as part of a larger survey of the Colorado Plateaus. His mapmakers used many Paiute place names.

Small groups of Mormon pioneers followed the explorers and attempted to settle east of Bryce Canyon along the Paria River. The Kanarra Cattle Company began grazing cattle there in 1873. The Church of Jesus Christ of Latter-day Saints sent Scottish immigrant Ebenezer Bryce and his wife Mary to settle land in the Paria Valley to apply his carpentry skills. The Bryce family settled right below Bryce Amphitheater—the main collection of hoodoos. Bryce grazed his cattle inside what are now park borders, and is reputed to have said that the amphitheaters were a "helluva place to lose a cow". He built a road to the plateau to retrieve firewood and timber, and a canal to irrigate his crops and water his animals. Other settlers soon started to call the canyon at the end of road "Bryce's Canyon", and the name stuck.

A combination of drought, overgrazing, and flooding eventually drove the remaining Paiutes from the area and prompted the settlers to attempt to build a water diversion channel from the Sevier River drainage. That effort failed, leading most settlers, including the Bryce family, to abandon the area. Bryce moved his family to Arizona in 1880. The remaining settlers dug a 10-mile (16 km) ditch from the Sevier's east fork into Tropic Valley.

=== Creation of the park ===
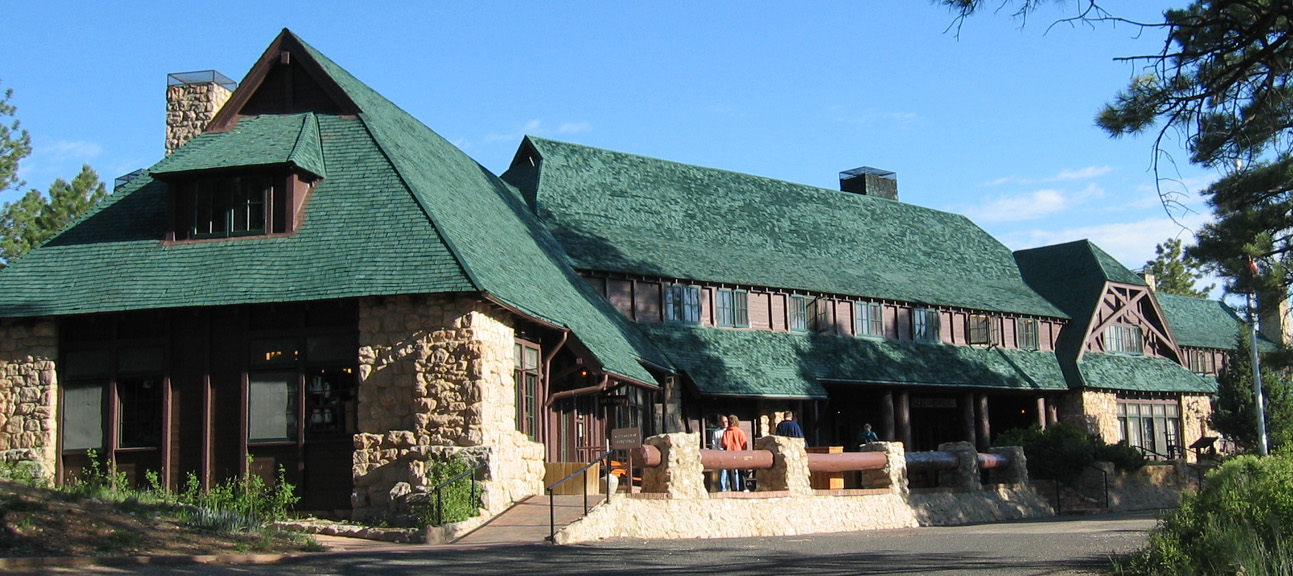
Bryce Canyon Lodge was built between 1924 and 1925 from local materials.

These scenic areas were first described to the public in magazine articles published by Union Pacific and Santa Fe railroads in 1916. Forest Supervisor J. W. Humphrey among others promoted the scenic wonders of Bryce Canyon's amphitheaters, and by 1918 additional articles helped generate public interest. Ruby Syrett, Harold Bowman, and the Perry brothers later established lodging and "touring services". Syrett later served as the first postmaster. By the early 1920s, the Union Pacific Railroad became interested in expanding rail service into southwestern Utah to accommodate tourists.

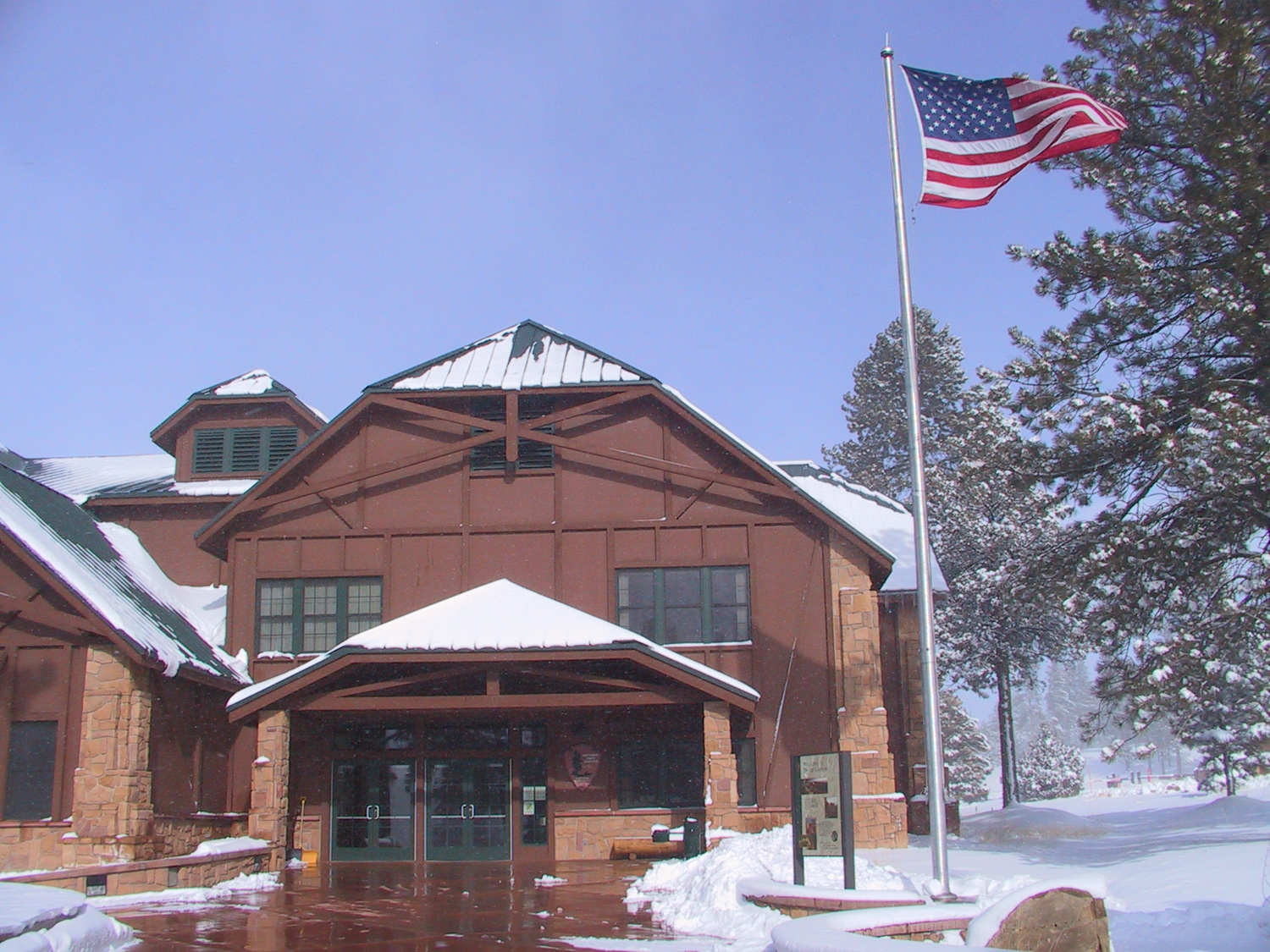
Visitor center in winter

Conservation advocates became alarmed by the damage overgrazing, logging, and unregulated visitation was inflicting on the canyon. A protection effort soon began, and National Park Service Director Stephen Mather responded by proposing that Bryce Canyon be made into a state park. However, the governor of Utah and the Utah State Legislature lobbied for national protection. Mather relented and sent his recommendation to President Warren G. Harding, who on June 8, 1923, established Bryce Canyon National Monument.

A road was built the same year on the plateau to provide access to outlooks over the amphitheaters. From 1924 to 1925, Bryce Canyon Lodge was built from local timber and stone.

Members of the United States Congress started work in 1924 on upgrading Bryce Canyon's protection status from national monument to national park to establish Utah National Park. A process led by the Utah Parks Company for transferring ownership of private and state-held land to the federal government started in 1923. The last of the land was acquired four years later, and on February 25, 1928, Bryce Canyon National Park was established.

In 1931, President Herbert Hoover annexed an adjoining area south of the park, and in 1942 an additional 635 acres (257 ha) was added. This brought the park's total area to the ultimate 35,835 acres (14,502 ha). Rim Road, a scenic drive from the northern entrance to Rainbow Point, was completed in 1935.

=== Post-1950 ===
The USS Bryce Canyon, named for the park, served as a supply and repair ship in the U.S. Pacific Fleet from September 15, 1950, to June 30, 1981.

Park administration was conducted from Zion National Park until 1956 when Bryce Canyon's first superintendent started work.

Bryce Canyon Natural History Association (BCNHA) is a non-profit organization, established in 1961. It runs the bookstore inside the park visitor center and support interpretive, educational, and scientific activities.

Bryce Canyon Lodge achieved National Historic Landmark status in 1987, preserved as an example of National Park Service architecture from the 1920s.

Responding to increased visitation and traffic congestion, NPS implemented a voluntary, summer-only, in-park shuttle system in June 2000. The Rim Road was reconstructed between 2002 and 2004. As part of that reconstruction, the roadbed was revegetated with native grasses, to fight invasive species.

In 2019, Bryce Canyon was given Dark Sky Park status by the International Dark-Sky Association.

== Geology ==
Erosion of sedimentary rocks has created natural arches.

The Bryce Canyon area experienced soil deposition that spans from the last part of the Cretaceous period and the first half of the Cenozoic era. The ancient depositional environment varied. Dakota Sandstone and Tropic Shale were deposited in the warm, shallow waters of the advancing and retreating Cretaceous Seaway (outcrops of these rocks are found just outside park borders).

Other formations were created, but mostly eroded away following two major periods of uplift. The Laramide orogeny affected the entire western part of what would become North America starting about 70 million to 50 MYA. This event helped to build the Rocky Mountains and in the process closed the Cretaceous Seaway. The Straight Cliffs, Wahweap, and Kaiparowits formations were victims of this uplift. The Colorado Plateaus rose 16 MYA and were segmented into plateaus, separated by faults and each having its own uplift rate.

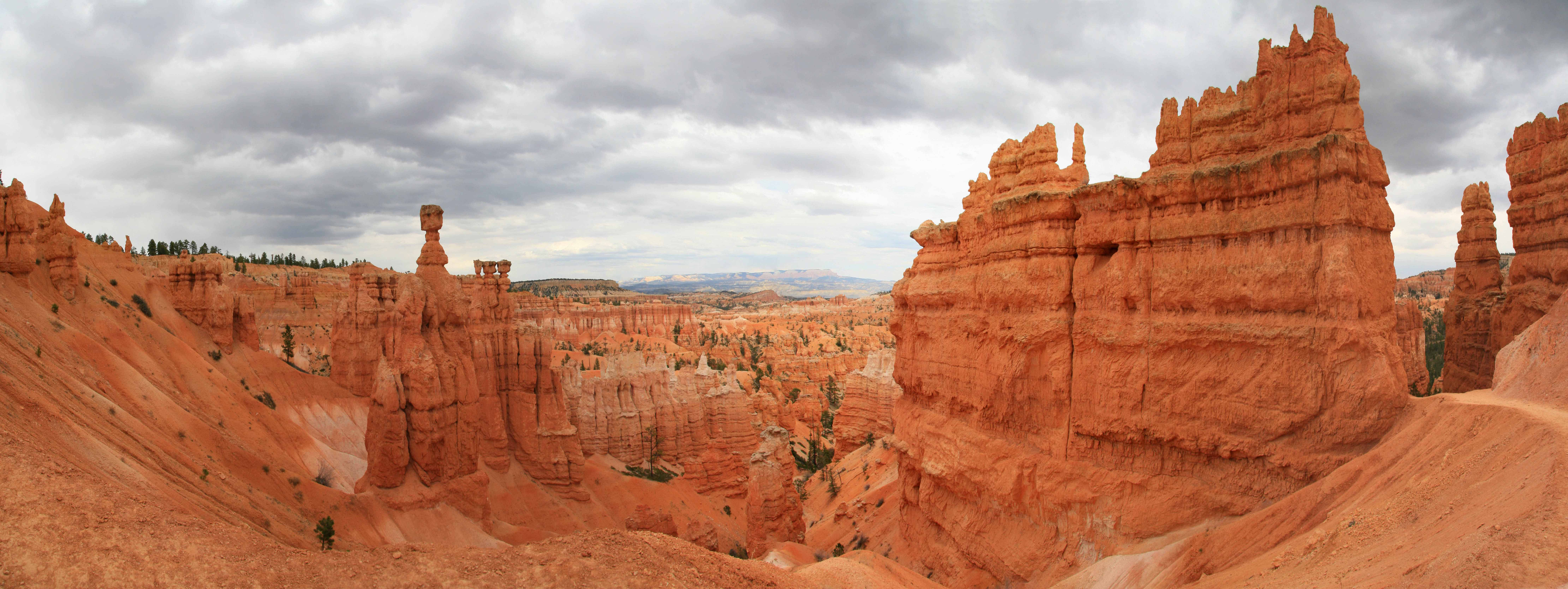
Thor's Hammer

This uplift created vertical joints, which over time preferentially eroded. The soft Pink Cliffs of the Claron Formation eroded to form freestanding hoodoo pinnacles in badlands, while the more resistant White Cliffs formed monoliths. The dominant bright orange colors are from hematite (iron oxide; Fe_{2}O_{3}); the yellows from limonite (FeO(OH)·nH_{2}O); and the purples are from pyrolusite (MnO_{2}).

== Ecology ==
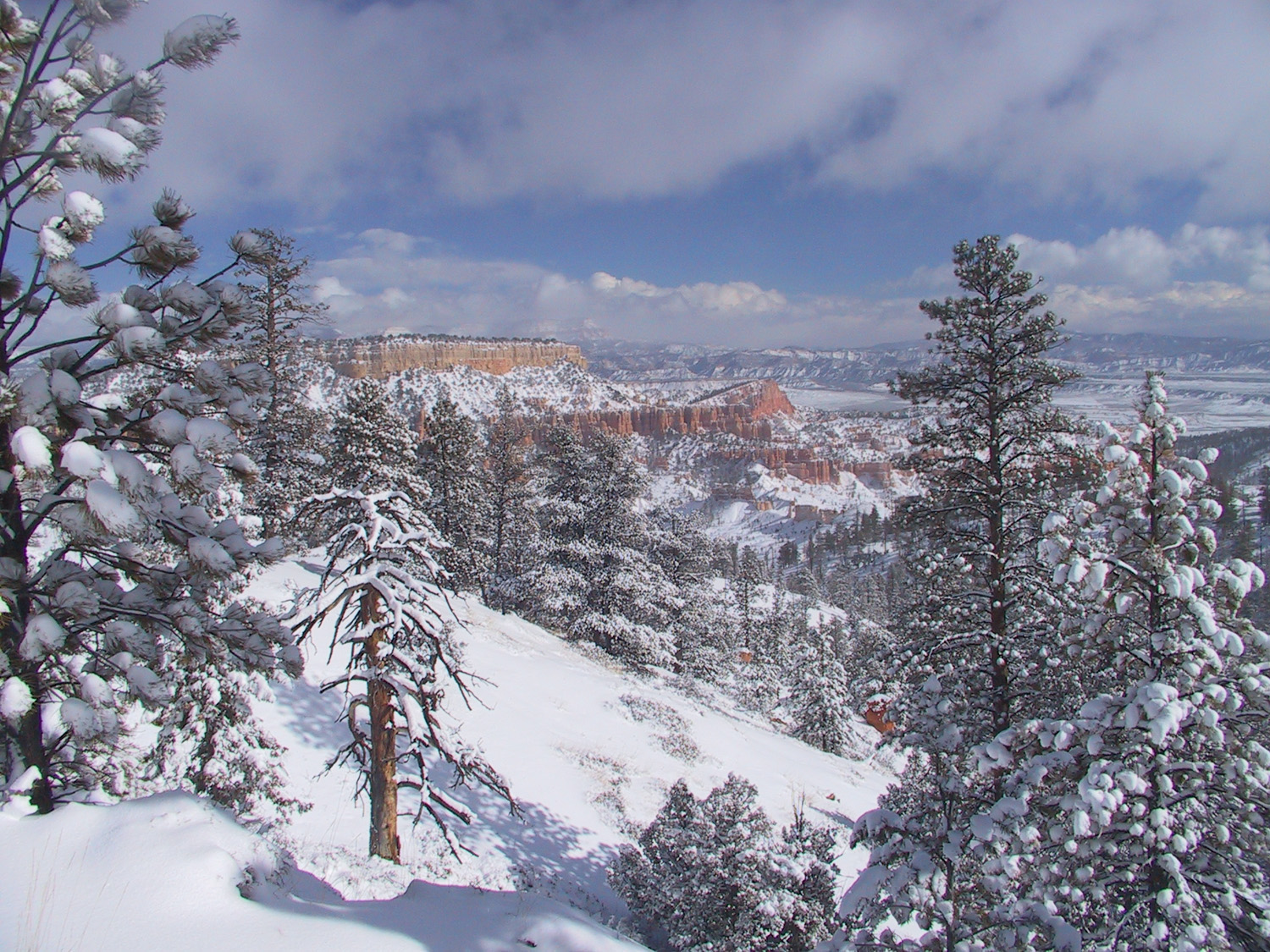
Bryce Canyon has extensive fir forests.

More than 1000 plant species live in the park.

The park spans three life zones, depending on elevation.

1. The highest areas have Douglas fir, blue spruce, and quaking aspen. Mule deer, elk, and grouse eat young fir shoots here. Squirrels and Chipmunks are also found in this area
2. The mid elevations are dominated by Ponderosa pine forests, with greenleaf manzanita and Rocky Mountain juniper also occurring in these forests.
3. The lowest elevations are arid and have Colorado pinyon and Utah juniper trees. The seeds of the pinyon are consumed by pinyon jays and Clark's nutcrackers, which help the pinyons reproduce.

The park has 59 mammal species, more than 45 species of butterflies and moths, over 100 species of birds, and a large number of insect species. The forests and meadows support diverse animal life, including ringtails. Larger mammals include deer, antelope, elk, and mountain lions. Birds of the park include peregrine falcons, ospreys, jays, and hummingbirds. Eleven species of reptiles and four species of amphibians have been found. Reptiles include the Great Basin rattlesnake, short-horned lizard, side-blotched lizard, striped whipsnake, and amphibians include the tiger salamander.

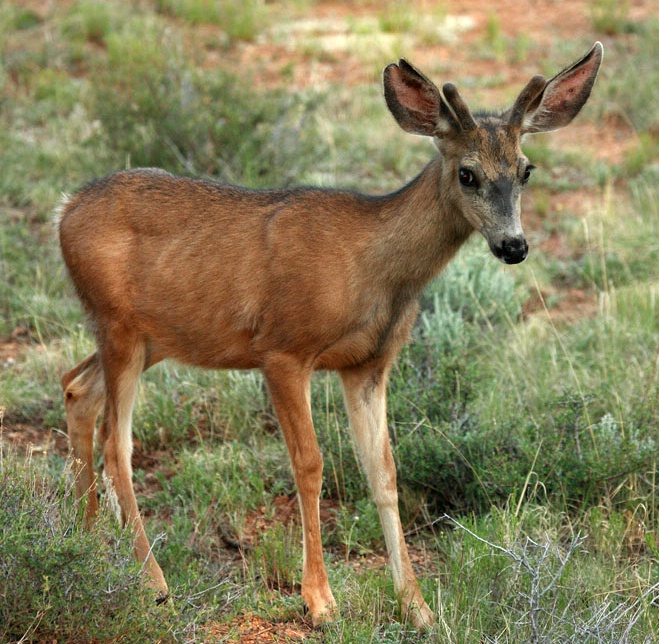
A mule deer fawn

The park forms part of the habitat of three wildlife species listed under the Endangered Species Act: the Utah prairie dog, the California condor, and the southwestern willow flycatcher. The Utah prairie dog is a threatened species that was reintroduced to the park. The largest protected population is found in the park.

Also in the park are the black, lumpy, very slow-growing colonies of cryptobiotic soil, which are a mix of lichens, algae, fungi, and cyanobacteria. Together these organisms slow erosion, add nitrogen to the soil, and help it to retain moisture.

== Activities ==
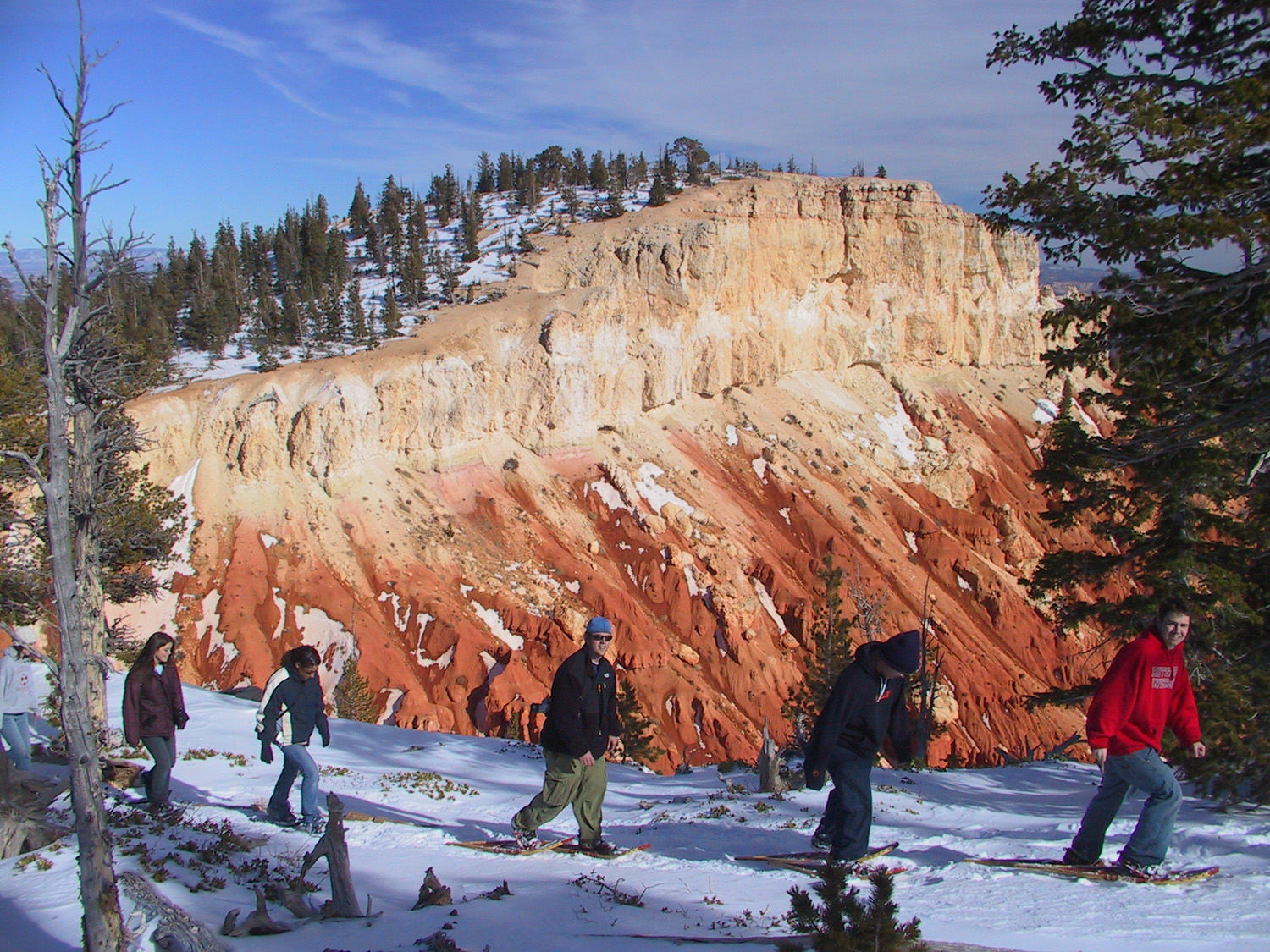
Snowshoes are required for winter hiking.

Bryce Canyon has eight marked and maintained day hikes:

Easy to moderate hikes

- Mossy Cave (one hour, State Route 12 northwest of Tropic)
- Rim Trail (5–6 hours, anywhere on the rim)
- Bristlecone Loop (one hour, Rainbow Point), and Queens Garden (1–2 hours, Sunrise Point)

Moderate hikes

- Navajo Loop (1–2 hours, Sunset Point)
- Tower Bridge (2–3 hours, north of Sunrise Point)

Strenuous hikes

- Fairyland Loop (4–5 hours, Fairyland Point)
- Peekaboo Loop (3–4 hours, Bryce Point)

Several of the trails intersect, allowing hikers to arrange routes for more challenging hikes.

Navajo Loop trail below the rim in Bryce Canyon National Park, Utah, 2026

The park has two trails designated for overnight trips: the 9-mile (14 km) Riggs Spring Loop Trail and the 23-mile (37 km) Under-the-Rim Trail.

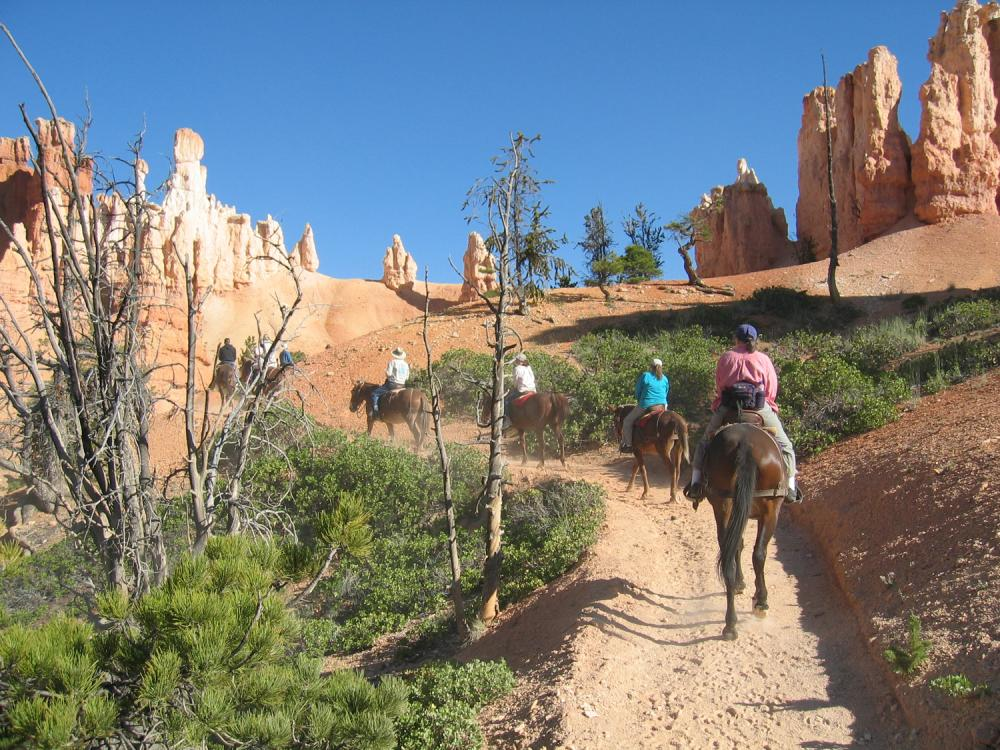
Horseback riders in the park

On clear days the Navajo Mountain and the Kaibab Plateau can be seen 90 miles (140 km) away in Arizona from Yovimpa and Rainbow points and the Black Mesas of eastern Arizona and western New Mexico can be seen 160 miles (260 km) away.

The park has a 7.4 magnitude night sky, one of the darkest in North America and patrons can see approximately 7,500 stars. Park rangers host public stargazing events and evening programs on astronomy, nocturnal animals, and night sky protection. The Bryce Canyon Astronomy Festival, typically held in June, attracts thousands of visitors. In honor of this festival, Asteroid 49272 was named after the national park.

The two campgrounds are North Campground and Sunset Campground. Loop A in North Campground is open year-round. Additional loops and Sunset Campground are open from late spring to early autumn.

== See also ==
- List of national parks of the United States
- Big Thunder Mountain Railroad
- Bryce (software), a 3D landscape rendering software
