= Fortymile Gulch =

River in Utah, United States

Coordinates: 37.333°N 110.991°W

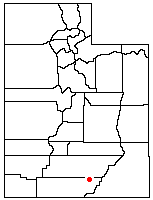
Location of Fortymile and Willow Gulches within Utah

Fortymile Gulch and Willow Gulch are tributaries of the Escalante River, located in Kane County in southern Utah, in the western United States. With a combined length of over 20 miles (32 km), they exhibit many of the geologic features found in the Canyons of the Escalante, including high vertical canyon walls, water pools, narrow slot canyons, domes, and arches. Popular recreational destinations, they are located within the Grand Staircase–Escalante National Monument.

The headwaters of Fortymile and Willow Gulches have their origins along a 7-mile-long (11 km) segment of the Straight Cliffs, the eastern edge of the Kaiparowits Plateau. Intermittent streams merge to form larger branches, then combine to carve a deep canyon up to 500 feet (150 m) into sandstone layers before meeting the main channel of the Escalante River. The northernmost branch is Fortymile Gulch, the historic location of the winter encampment of the San Juan Expedition. Intent on founding a colony in southeastern Utah, they waited at Fortymile Springs in late 1879 while a smaller group prepared a perilous route down to the Colorado River at Hole-in-the-Rock. Nearby is Dance Hall Rock, a scenic dome formed from Entrada sandstone. The lower section of Fortymile Gulch, before it merges with Willow Gulch, is a narrow channel of slot canyons and water pools.

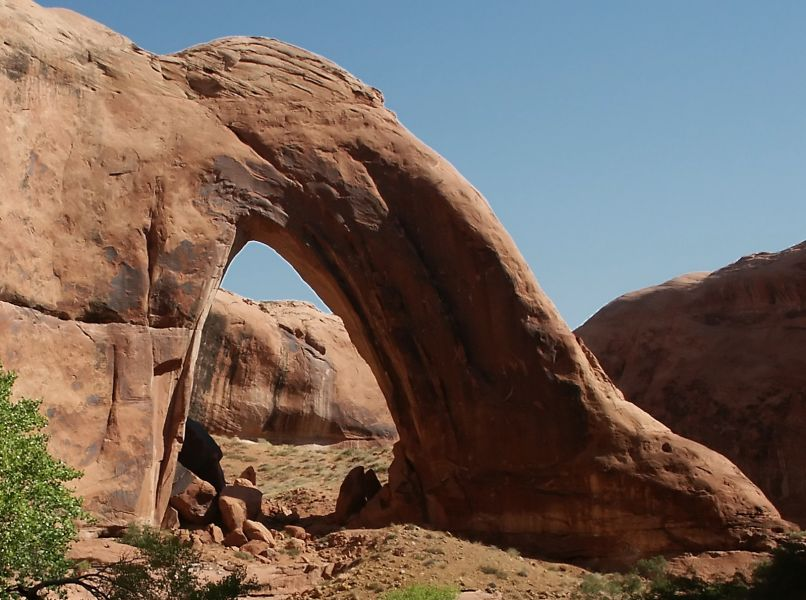
Broken Bow Arch, in Willow Gulch.

Willow Gulch (sometimes mapped as Sooner Gulch) is the southern section of Fortymile Gulch, and it is here that the most scenic features can be found. At the head of one branch of the canyon are another group of sandstone domes, the Sooner Rocks. The bottom of Willow Gulch can be accessed via a trailhead just off of the Hole-in-the-Rock Road. Approximately one mile downstream is Broken Bow Arch, named after a Native American artifact found nearby. The opening is estimated at 94 feet (29 m) wide and 100 feet (30 m) high, demonstrating the arch-forming ability of Navajo sandstone. Downstream from there the canyon passes through a deep pool of water in a narrow slot canyon, merges with the main branch of Fortymile Gulch and two tributaries draining from the north, and then proceeds down to the Escalante River. Much of this lower section may now be under the surface of Lake Powell, depending on the level of the reservoir behind the Glen Canyon Dam.

Other Pictures from Willow Gulch

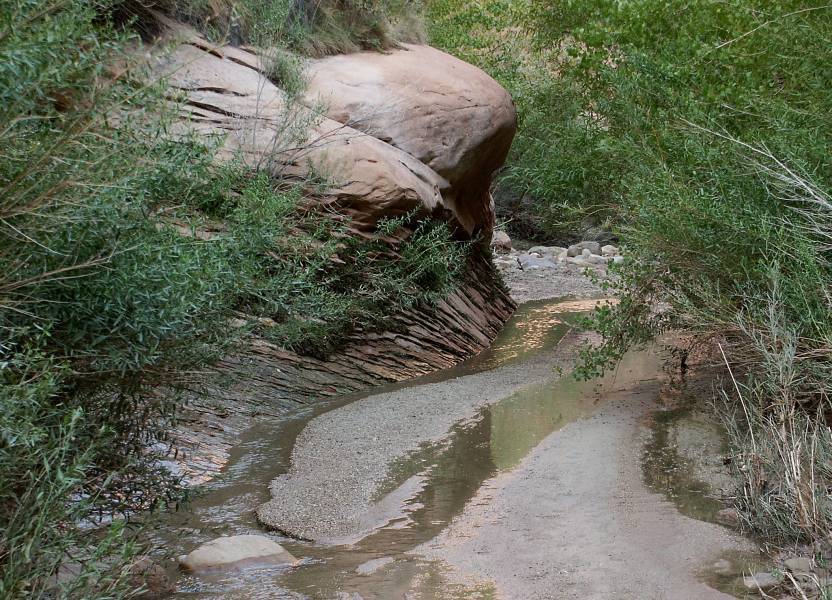
Streambed

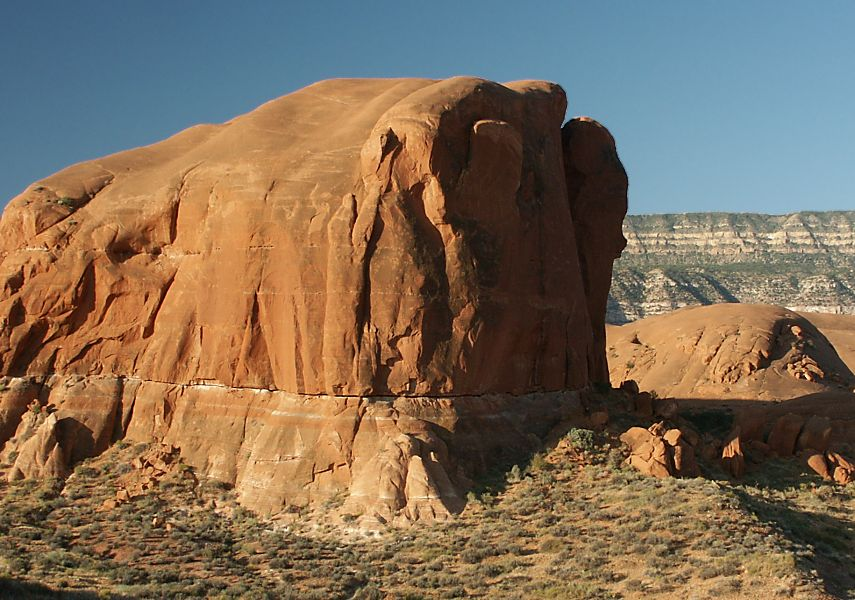
Sooner Rocks

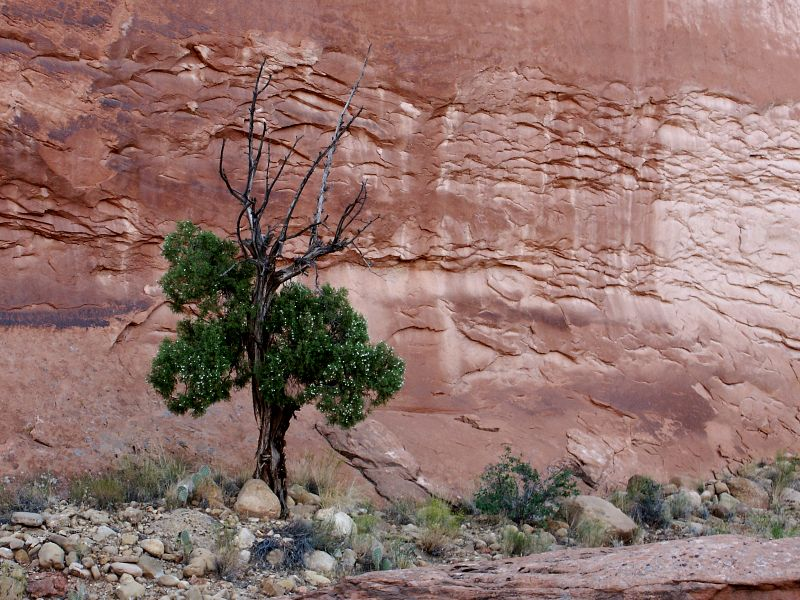
Canyon walls

== See also ==
- List of rivers of Utah
