= Devils Garden (Garfield County, Utah) =

Natural formation in Arches National Park in Grand County, Utah, United States

- IUCN category Ib (wilderness area)
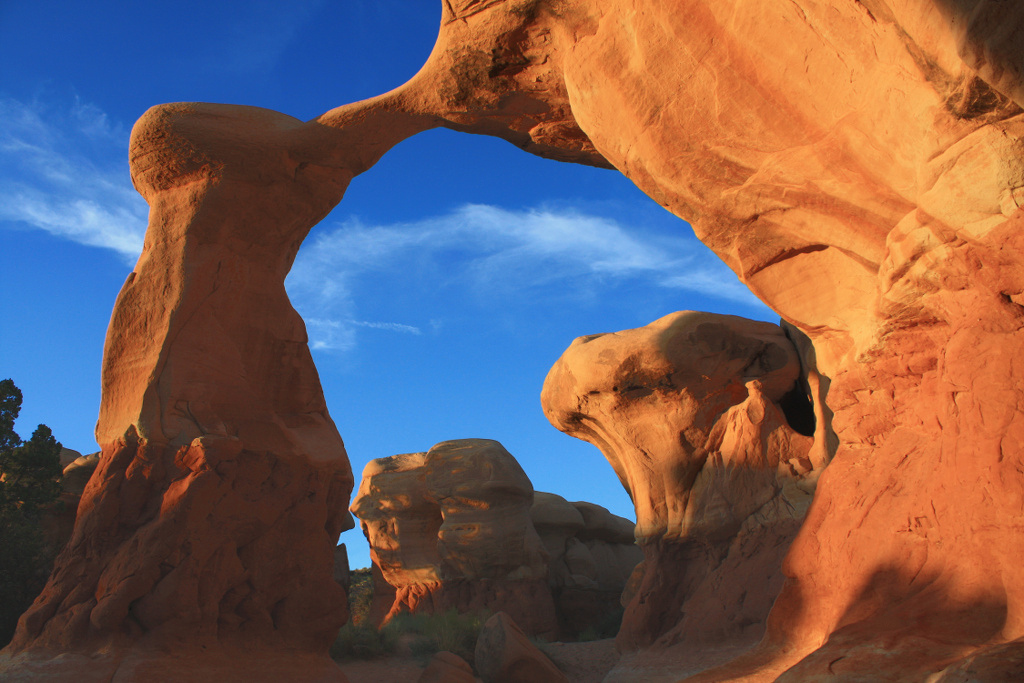
- Metate Arch

- Location within the United States Location within Utah
- Location: Garfield County, Utah, United States
- Nearest city: Escalante, Utah
- Coordinates: 37°35′08″N 111°24′53″WUSGS
- Area: 640 acres (2.6 km^{2})
- Elevation: 5243
- Designated: December 31, 1979
- Governing body: U.S. Bureau of Land Management
- Website: Official website

The Devils Garden (Note: The United States Board on Geographic Names generally omits apostrophes in place names) in Garfield County, Utah, United States, is a protected area featuring hoodoos, natural arches and other sandstone formations. The area is also known as the Devils Garden Outstanding Natural Area within the National Landscape Conservation System.

The formations in the Devils Garden were created, and continue to be shaped, by various weathering and erosional processes. These natural processes have been shaping sandstone layers formed more than 166 million years ago during the Jurassic period's Middle epoch.

The Bureau of Land Management (BLM) administers the Devils Garden and the entire GSENM which is the first national monument assigned to the BLM.

== Geography ==
The Devils Garden is located about 17 mi (27 km) by road southeast of Escalante, Utah. To the west of the area are the Straight Cliffs which define the eastern edge of the Kaiparowits Plateau. To the east of the area is the Escalante River whose tributaries have formed many slot canyons. To the north is the Dixie National Forest and to the south are the Hole-in-the-Rock and Lake Powell which are located within the Glen Canyon National Recreation Area. The Devils Garden is situated at an elevation of 5,243 ft (1,598 m) above sea level in Garfield County, Utah. The area measures 640 acres which is equal to 1 square mile (2.6 square kilometres).

The Hole-in-the-Rock Road is the main access road to the Devils Garden. The unpaved road heads southeast into the national monument beginning at its intersection with Utah Scenic Byway 12 about 5 mi (8.0 km) east of Escalante. After traveling about 12 mi (19 km) along the Hole-in-the-Rock Road there is a road to the right leading to the Devils Garden area. The majority of the interesting sandstone formations are located in a compact area adjacent to the parking lot.

A climate summary and the current weather forecast for the Escalante area are available in the External links section.

== Features ==
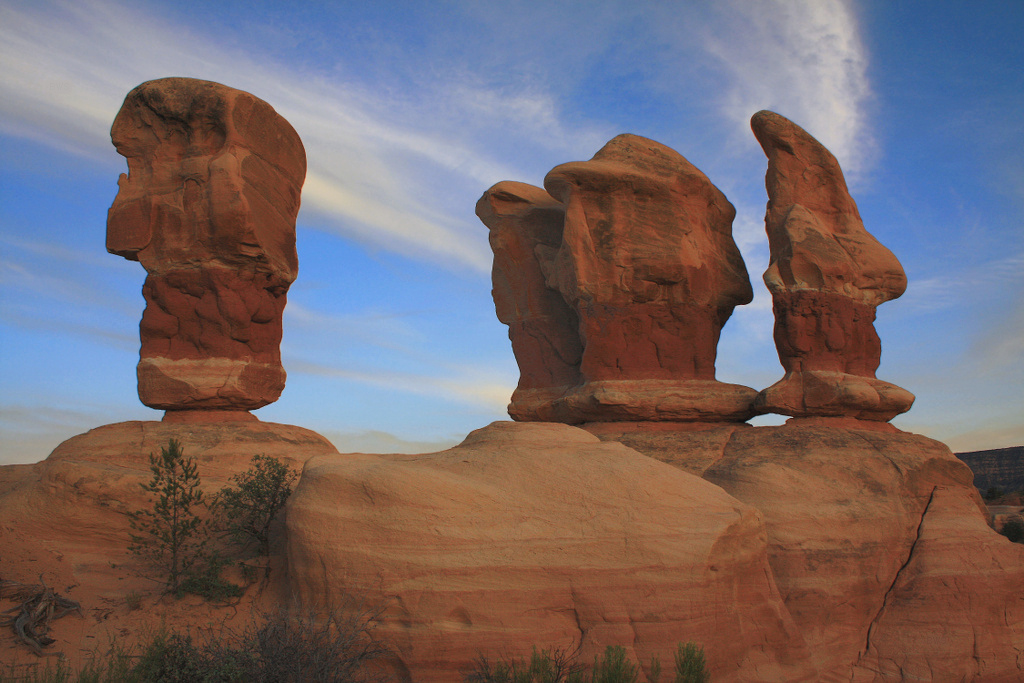
The four hoodoos

Metate Arch is a slender caprock natural arch located near the center of the Devils Garden, while a thicker arch named Mano Arch is located southeast of Metate Arch. Many hoodoos of varying sizes and shapes are scattered throughout the Devils Garden, with a particular group of four prominent hoodoos, with no official USGS name, being a popular photographic subject.

Metate Arch 37°35′4.4″N 111°24′49.5″W
Mano Arch 37°35′3.9″N 111°24′48.5″W
Four hoodoos 37°35′1.6″N 111°24′49.8″W

There are no marked trails but many well-worn footpaths lead to the most interesting formations. Since the Devils Garden is part of a protected area, visitors must not disturb any plants, animals or the delicate biological soil crust. Climbing on or over the natural arches is not permitted by the BLM.

== Facilities ==
Picnic tables and toilet facilities are available. Water is not available and there are no other services provided. Primitive camping is allowed at some points along the Hole-in-the-Rock Road but not at the Devils Garden area or parking lot. A free camping permit is required in advance to camp within the national monument.

== Geology ==
The rock formations of the Escalante area have been designated the Escalante Member of Entrada Sandstone of the San Rafael Group by geologists, and were formed in the Middle Jurassic epoch (166 to 174 million years ago). The Straight Cliffs Formation of the Kaiparowits Plateau to the west of the Devils Garden were formed during the more recent Cretaceous period. Paleontologists are interested in the area because the rock formations were deposited when the dinosaurs roamed the Earth. Many dinosaur fossils and tracks have been discovered by scientists working within the boundaries of the GSENM.

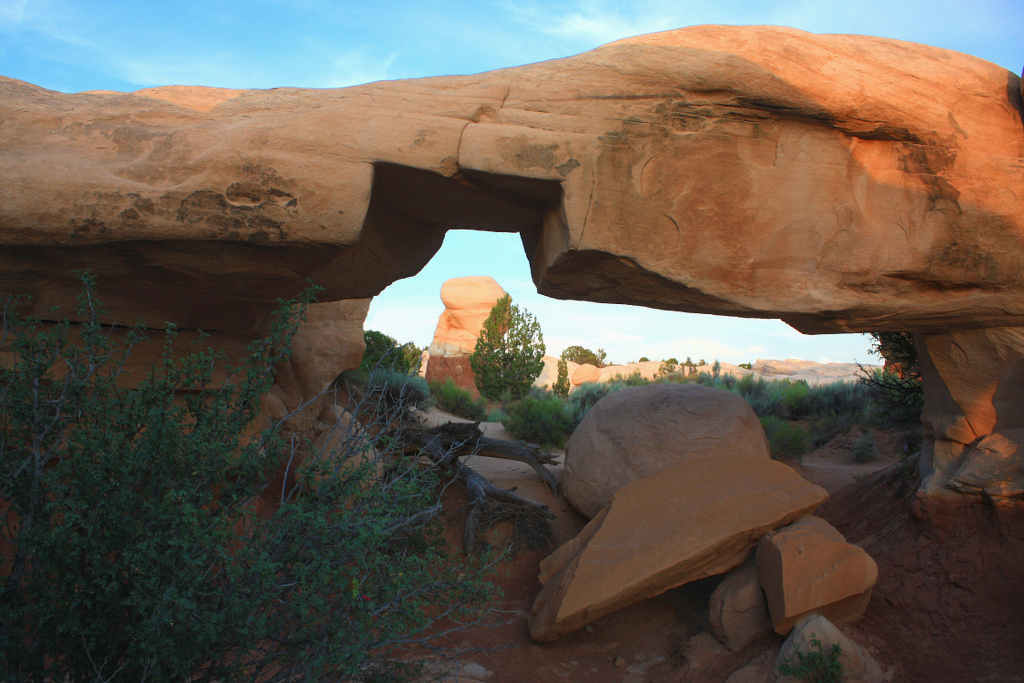
Mano Arch

The natural arches and other formations were created, and continue to be shaped, by the natural processes of weathering and erosion. Some of the rock layers are composed of a harder caprock material which resists the effects of weathering and erosion. Those caprock layers will remain intact much longer than other less resistant layers which weather and erode away below and around them leaving behind the current arches and hoodoos. Cycles of heat and cold, precipitation, ice, wind and gravity all play a part in the creation of the formations.

Daily extreme temperature variations create fractures by repeated expansion and contraction of the rock in a process called thermal stress weathering. The thermal stresses can cause deep cracks that split the rock into separate pieces in an erosional process called thermal exfoliation. Precipitation causes dissolution of the fine crystalline grains that bind the larger particles together, which is known as chemical weathering. Freezing water expands in fractures making them wider and deeper in a process called frost weathering. Gravity exerts a constant downward force that creates new fractures and separates the formations along existing fractures in a process called stress relief exfoliation. High speed winds remove any loose grains from the formations and wind-borne particulates sandblast the surfaces making them smoother.

== Wilderness ==
Map of Devil's Garden Wilderness Study Area

The Devils Garden is also known as a Wilderness Study Area for the purpose of possible wilderness designation; however, wilderness status was not recommended by the BLM's District Manager in an Instant Study Area report submitted to the U.S. Congress in 1991. One of the stated reasons was that the existing roads, parking lot, picnic tables and toilet facilities are all in close proximity to the natural area. A second reason was the likelihood of several groups of people converging at the same time around the main formations of the site, which are located in a 10-acre area adjacent to the parking lot (1.6% of the total designated area of 640 acres). Both of those reasons diminish the wilderness experience of solitude in a remote natural setting.

The Devils Garden remains undeclared as a wilderness area but also remains on a list of BLM Wilderness Study Areas compiled in December 2010.

== See also ==
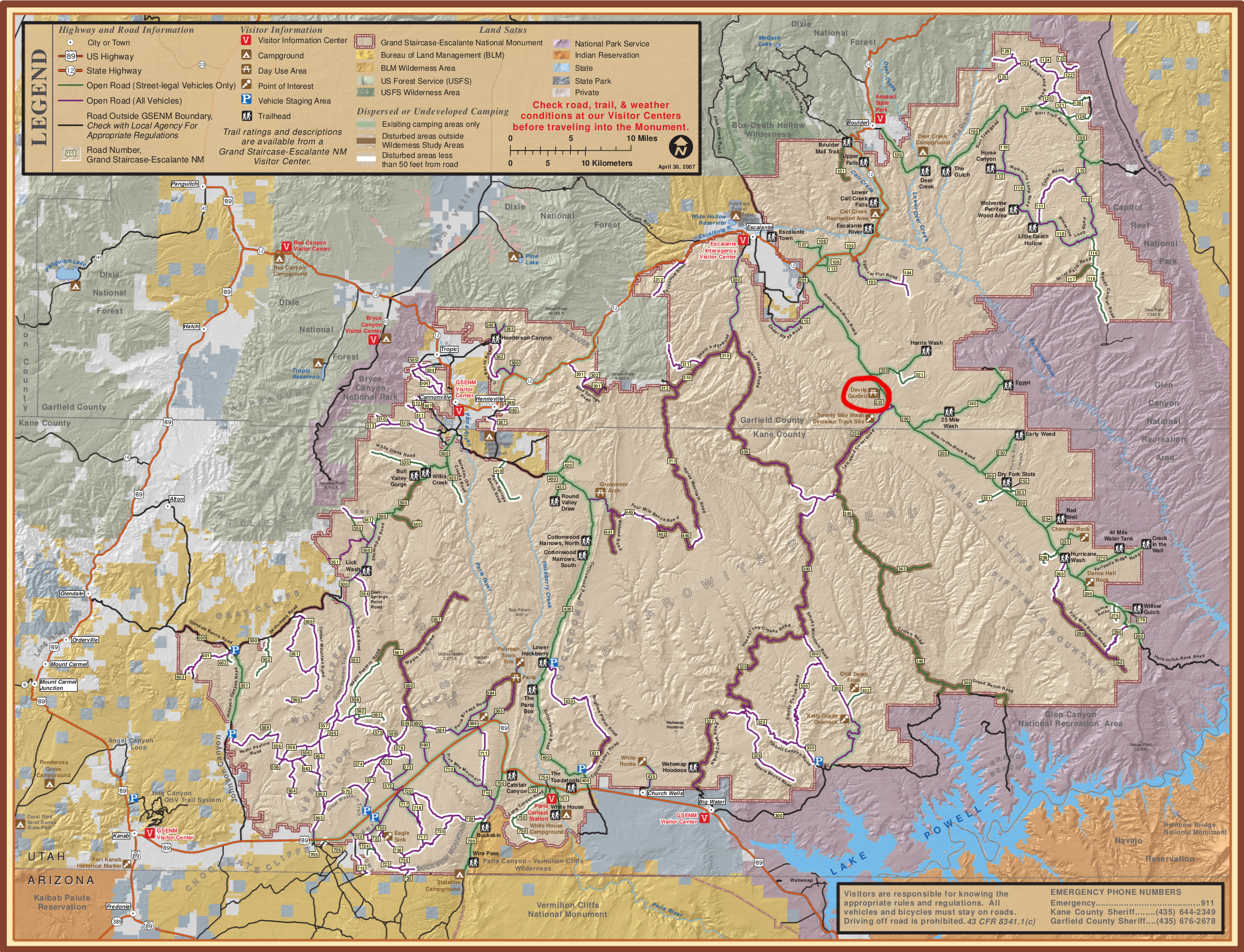
Park map with the Devils Garden circled in red (click on map to enlarge)

Major sections of the Grand Staircase–Escalante National Monument:

- Grand Staircase, west
- Canyons of the Escalante, east
- Kaiparowits Plateau, central

Roads and features:

- Utah Scenic Byway 12
- Hole-in-the-Rock Road
- Hole-in-the-Rock formation

Notable explorers:

- Silvestre Vélez de Escalante, name origin of city, river, and monument
- Domínguez–Escalante expedition, skirted but did not enter the monument area in 1776
- San Juan Expedition, traveled through the monument in 1879–80
- Everett Ruess, a young solo explorer of the Escalante Canyons area in 1934
