= Metate (disambiguation) =

A metate is a Mesoamerican quern or milling-stone.

Metate may also refer to:

- Metate (yearbook), the yearbook of Pomona College from 1894 to 2012
- Metate Arch, a natural arch in Devils Garden, Utah, U.S.
