= San Juan Expedition =

Coordinates: 37°15′25″N 110°54′04″W

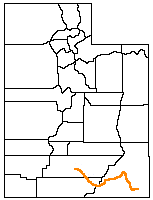
Route of the San Juan Expedition through Utah

The San Juan Expedition (also known as the San Juan Mission or the Hole-in-the-Rock Expedition) was a group of Mormon settlers intent on establishing a colony in what is now southeastern Utah, in the western United States. Their difficult passage through the deep canyons of the Colorado River represents the ingenuity and determination needed during the country's era of western exploration and settlement.

== Background ==
After arriving in the Salt Lake Valley in 1847, the Mormons had expanded their settlements throughout central and southeastern Utah. In 1878 the leaders of their church decided to establish a new colony in a remote area to the east of the Colorado River, in what is now the Four Corners Area. They appointed Silas S. Smith, Jens Nielson and others as the leaders of the planned settlement expedition. They scouted possible sites, deciding on the fertile valley of Montezuma Creek just north of the San Juan River. Routes to the new settlement were also scouted, including the established path of the Old Spanish Trail and a long route around the southern rim of the Grand Canyon.

The expedition decided, however, to use a more direct (but largely unknown) route that would be hundreds of miles shorter. They would travel through the relatively benign terrain near the Escalante River, find a way to cross the Colorado River, and then negotiate the mesas and canyons on the other side.

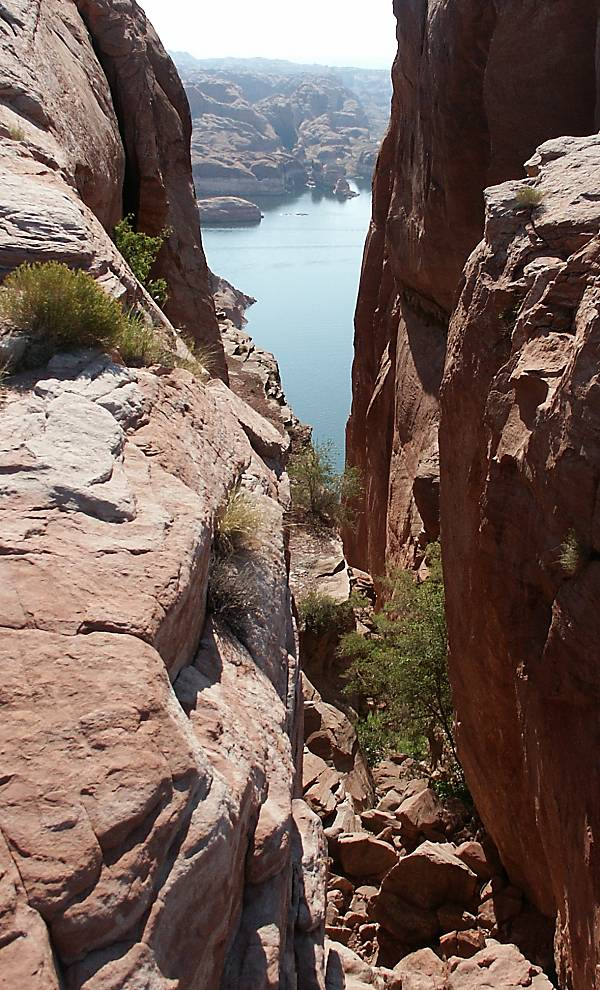
Hole-in-the-Rock, looking down at Lake Powell.

== The expedition ==
In the fall of 1879 volunteers for the expedition assembled their wagons, supplies, and livestock at a spring at the head of Fortymile Gulch, just south of the deep canyons of the Escalante River Basin, and just north of the cliffs of the Kaiparowits Plateau. A smaller group went ahead to find and prepare a crossing for Glen Canyon and the Colorado River. At Cottonwood Canyon they saw a tempting route up from the far side of the river and, on the near side, a narrow crevice that might allow a descent into the canyon. Naming it Hole-in-the-Rock, they proceeded to spend several months widening it for the passage of wagons, and building anchor points and tracks to assist with the descent.

The main expedition proceeded on what is now the Hole in the Rock Trail and, on January 26, 1880, began their descent to the river. People and livestock climbed down the crevice, and wagons descended with brakes locked and as many as 10-20 men holding ropes to slow the descent. A wooden trackway near the bottom provided access around a gulch filled with boulders. A wooden ferry was built at the river by Charles Hall, and was used to cross the river. Despite the perilous nature of this route, all of the expedition made the descent (a third of it on the first day).

A member of the expedition, Kumen Jones, wrote:

After about six weeks work and waiting for powder, etc., a start was made to move the wagons down the hole. I had a well broken team and hitched it on to B. Perkins wagon and drove it down through the hole. Long ropes were provided and about 20 men and boys held on to the wagons to make sure that there would be no accidents, through [brakes] giving way, or horses cutting up after their long lay off, but all went smooth and safe, and by the 28th, most of the wagons were across the river and work had commenced again on the Cottonwood Canyon another very rough proposition.

However, the expedition found much greater difficulty on the east side of the river. A maze of canyons, mesas, and cliffs extending from the Colorado and San Juan Rivers makes this area almost impassible. The deep canyons of Grand Gulch had to be bypassed completely, forcing the expedition far to the north. Finally, they arrived at Salvation Knoll, atop Cedar Mesa near present-day Natural Bridges National Monument. They could now see an easier slope that would lead them down into Comb Wash, through which they could travel back south to the San Juan River. After traveling further east, and just twenty miles from their original goal, the exhausted expedition halted in April 1880 and founded the community of Bluff.

A journey planned for six weeks had instead taken six months. There were no deaths, and three children were born. The expedition's route was used as a supply road for just a year, and then Charles Hall moved his ferry to an easier crossing further north, one that was accessed by easier routes on both sides of the river.

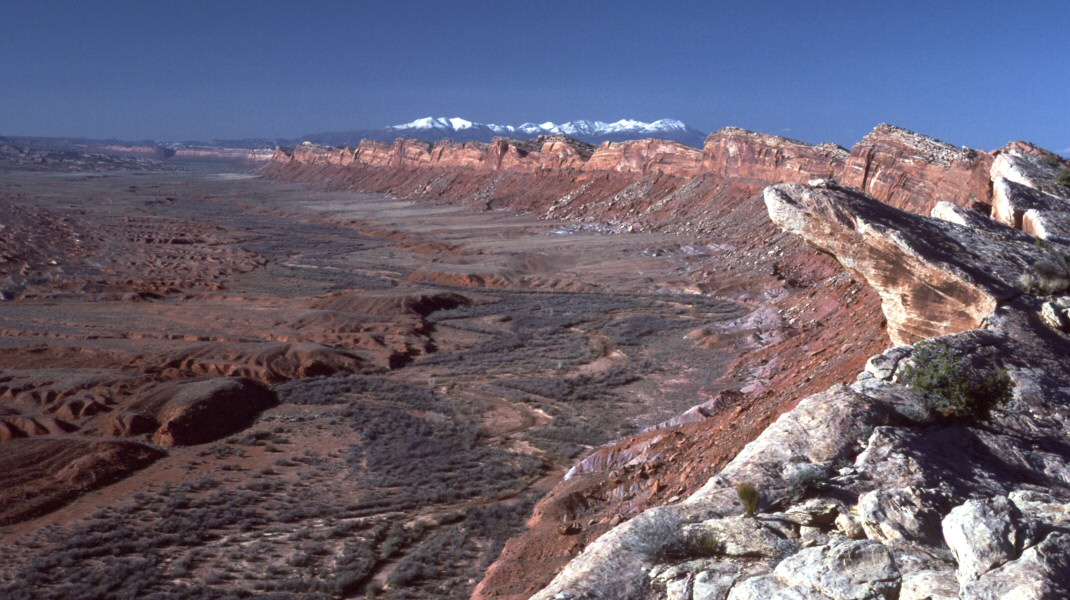
Comb Wash, looking north

== In popular culture ==
The Wagon Master is a 1950 movie by John Ford, loosely based on the San Juan Expedition.

The book The Undaunted is a historical novel by Gerald N. Lund which tells the story of the expedition, drawing on diaries and other accounts, and centering on one fictional family amongst real persons on the trip. Real persons include: Jens Nielson.

== See also ==
- Hole in the Rock Trail

== Sources ==
- "Hole-In-The-Rock", an informational brochure distributed by the National Park Service
- "Incredible Passage Through the Hole-In-The-Rock", by Lee Reay (1980) ISBN 0-934826-06-4
- "The Hole-in-the-Rock Trail a Century Later", by Allan Kent Powell (1983), ISBN 0-87905-885-4
- "Hole-in-the-Rock: An Epic in the Colonization of the Great American West", by David E. Miller (1966), ISBN 0-9639924-1-4
- "Saga of San Juan", by Cornelia Adams Perkins, Marian Gardner Nielson, and Lenora Butt Jones (1968)
- "A Guide to Southern Utah's Hole-in-the-Rock Trail", by Stewart Aitchison (2005), ISBN 0-87480-821-9
- Crabtree, Lamont (1994), "The Hole-In-The-Rock Trail", in Powell, Allan Kent (ed.), Utah History Encyclopedia, Salt Lake City, Utah: University of Utah Press, ISBN 0874804256, OCLC 30473917
