= Box-Death Hollow Wilderness =

Wilderness area in Utah, United States

- IUCN category Ib (wilderness area)
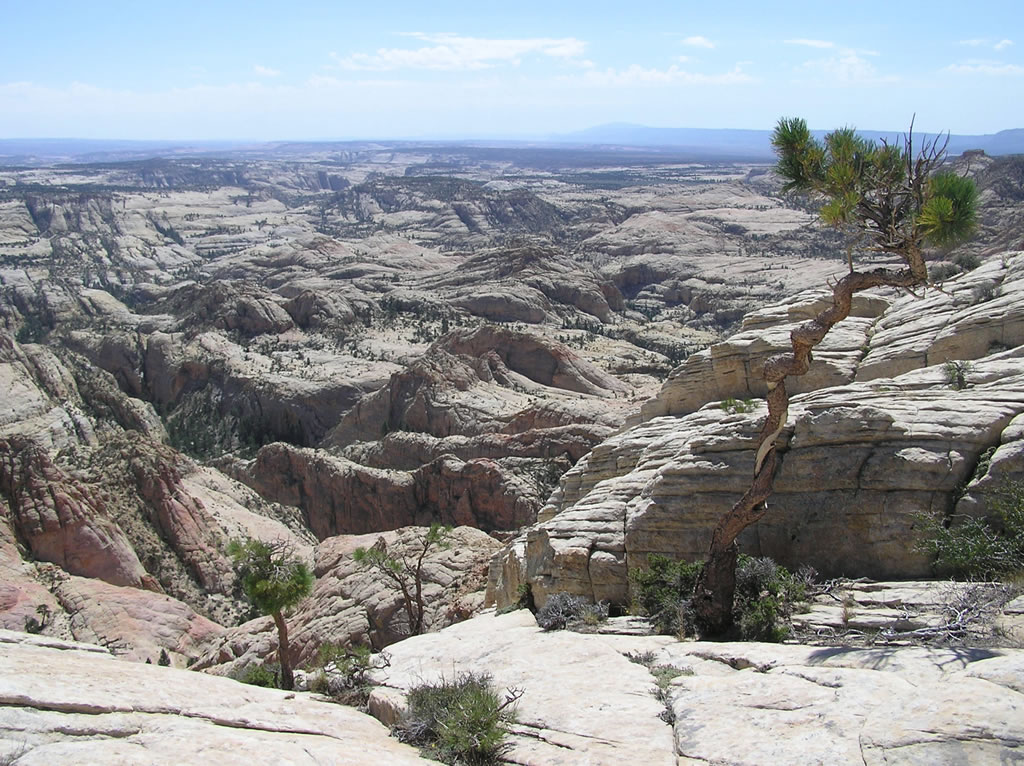
- Box-Death Hollow Wilderness

- Location within the United States
- Location: Garfield County, Utah, U.S.
- Nearest city: Escalante, Utah
- Coordinates: 37°53′30″N 111°38′03″W
- Established: September 18, 1984
- Governing body: U.S. Forest Service

Box-Death Hollow Wilderness is a 25,751 acres (104 km^{2}) wilderness area located in south-central Utah, United States, on the Dixie National Forest. Vertical gray-orange walls of Navajo sandstone stand above two canyon tributaries of the Escalante River in Box-Death Hollow. The name Death Hollow gives reference to a number of livestock that plunged to their death trying to cross the steep canyon.

Running north–south through a steeply dipping monocline, Pine Creek forms the box canyon (a canyon accessible only at the lower end) known as "The Box". Death Hollow Creek, east of The Box, has carved its way through a gently dipping monocline. Raging waters often flood these canyon narrows after a rain. Pinyon and juniper cover many of the plateaus above the canyons. Brown and rainbow trout are plentiful in Pine Creek and in portions of Sand Creek. Along the creek banks, you may see mule deer, an occasional cougar, or even elk in winter. Three bird species listed by the Utah Division of Wildlife Resources as "sensitive" can be found in the wilderness: Lewis's woodpecker, the western bluebird, and the mountain bluebird. Nine miles of trail run the distance of "the Box", while hiking in the remainder of this wilderness requires following drainages or undesignated routes.

The larger Phipps-Death Hollow area, a Bureau of Land Management wilderness study area, is adjacent to the wilderness on the south. Phipps-Death Hollow is part of the Grand Staircase–Escalante National Monument.

The Box-Death Hollow Wilderness briefly became the center of controversy during debate over the Utah Wilderness Act of 1984 due to a company that was interested in drilling exploration wells for carbon dioxide. The ridge-top well sites and routes leading to them were cherry-stemmed out of the north side of the legislated boundary, but the project never went into production.

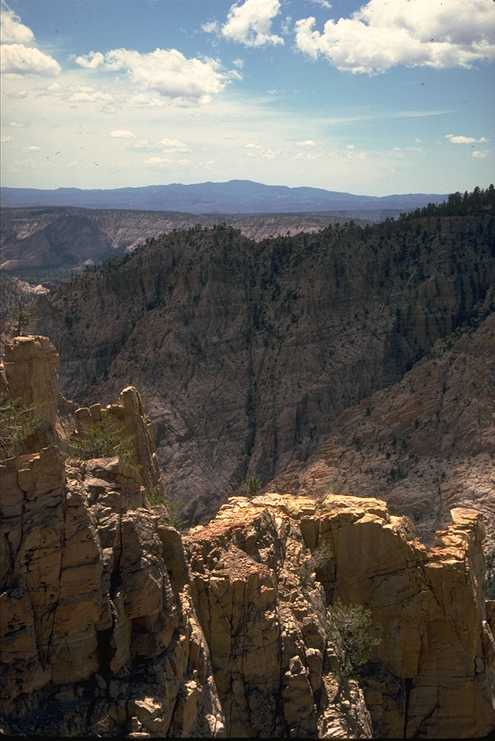
Death Hollow

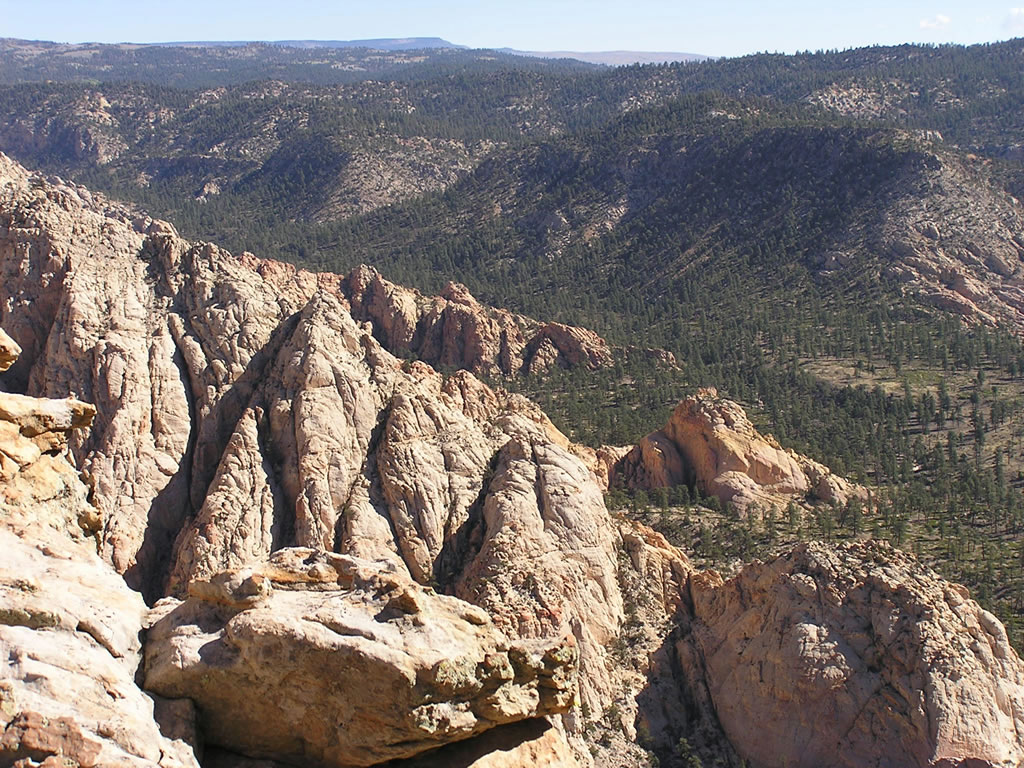
Box-Death Hollow Wilderness

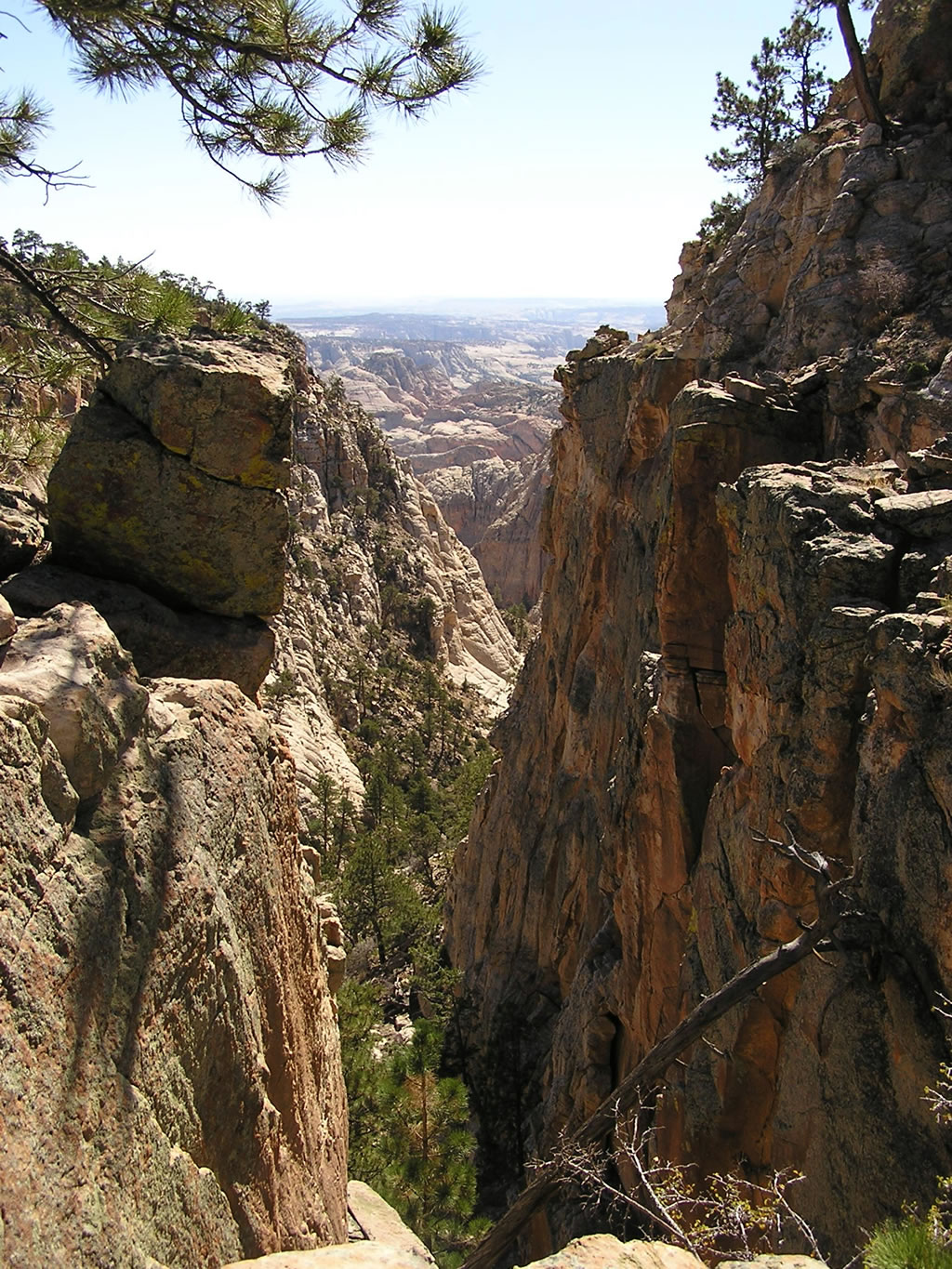
Death Hollow

== See also ==
- Dixie National Forest
- Wilderness
- National Wilderness Preservation System
- List of U.S. Wilderness Areas
- Wilderness Act
