= Jens Nielson =

Mormon leader (1821–1906)

Jens Nielson (26 April 1821 – 1906) was a prominent Mormon pioneer, a community leader, and a settler of the western United States. Nielson was one of the Mormon handcart pioneers that traveled across the plains to Salt Lake City under captain James G. Willie. Nielson and his family settled 6 towns, including Bluff, Utah, where he was a bishop of the Church of Jesus Christ of Latter-day Saints (LDS Church) for 26 years.

== Early years ==
Nielson was born on the island of Laaland, Denmark. His parents were Niels Jensen and Dorthea Margrethe Thomsen. Nielson became industrious and fairly successful in the coastal city of Aarhus, where he also owned land and livestock.

Nielson met LDS Church missionaries in the fall of 1852 and was later baptized a member of the church with his family on 29 March 1854.

== Pioneer years ==
After serving as a missionary in his native Laaland, Nielson left Denmark with his wife Elsie, their five-year-old son, and a young Mortensen girl named Bodil, for whom they assumed responsibility to bring to Utah Territory. It appears that Nielson had resources enough to have obtained supplies and traveled west early enough to beat the winter, but instead he joined the handcart company led by captain Willie.

During the climb over Rocky Ridge, Jens Nielson was failing. His feet became so frozen that he could not walk another step. Biographer Albert Lyman described the pathetic scene:

"In the fury of those storms which raged around them, [Jens] and his faithful wife toiled through the frozen snow till his feet were shapeless and useless with frost—he could walk no farther. What was to be done? Should he sink in the snow to die of despair? His young wife . . . looked at him—how desolate the world would be without him. 'Ride,' she urged. 'I can't leave you—I can pull the cart.'"

Jens and Elsie survived the trek over Rocky Ridge, but their only son, 6-year-old Niels, did not. He was buried with 12 others in the common grave at Rock Creek. Jens later said of this ordeal, "No person can describe it. It cannot be comprehended or understood by any human in this life, but only those who were called to pass through it." (The Price We Paid, By Andrew D. Olsen, See chapter: Crossing Rocky Ridge)

On the trip, Nielson's five-year-old son, Jens, and Bodil succumbed to snow, cold, starvation and exhaustion, and were buried in shallow graves under the snow. Nielson's feet became so frozen it caused his right foot to be at right angles and limped from it the rest of his life.

== Colonizing years ==
Nielson was an influential church and community leader in southern Utah. He is known as the founder of several communities including Cedar City and Bluff, Utah as part of the Hole-in-the-Rock expedition. Nielson served as a bishop for the LDS Church in the Bluff area. He was known for his kind leadership, heavy accent and a "sticketytoit" attitude. Nielson was also known to have served as an American Indian translator in San Juan County, Utah.

== Death ==
Nielson died 1906 while still serving as bishop. He is buried on Cemetery Hill, above town. One of Nielson's houses, in Bluff, still remains and was listed in 1982 on the National Register of Historic Places in San Juan County.
