= Hole in the Rock Trail =

- U.S. National Register of Historic Places
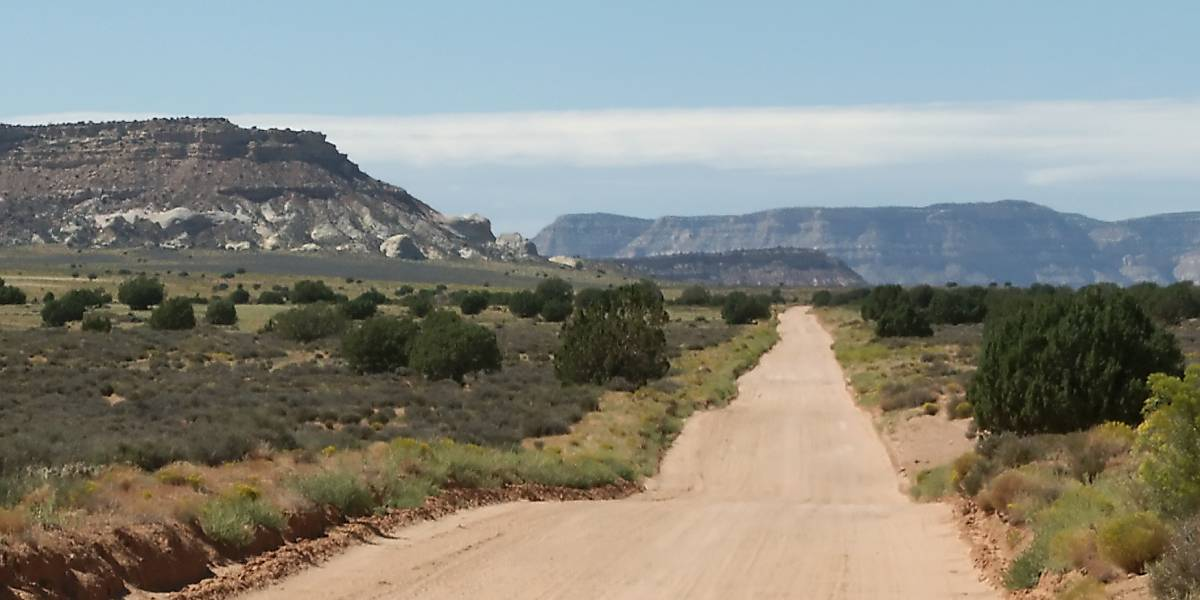
- The Hole in the Rock Trail passes between the Kaiparowits Plateau and the Escalante River

- Location within Utah Location within the United States
- Location: Garfield / Kane / San Juan counties, Utah, USA
- Nearest city: Escalante, Utah
- Coordinates: 37°43′39″N 111°31′53″W
- Built: 1879
- NRHP reference No.: 82004792
- Added to NRHP: August 09, 1982

The Hole in the Rock Trail (often hyphenated as Hole-in-the-Rock) is a historic trail running east-southeast from near the town of Escalante in southern Utah in the western United States. The Mormon settlers who established this trail crossed the Colorado River and ended their journey in the town of Bluff. The Hole-in-the-Rock expedition established the trail in 1879. The trail is located within the borders of the Grand Staircase–Escalante National Monument, the adjacent Glen Canyon National Recreation Area and federal Bureau of Land Management (BLM) public land to the east of the Colorado River. A geologic feature called the Hole in the Rock gave the trail its name. A mostly unpaved road called the Hole-in-the-Rock Road (BLM Road 200) closely follows this historic trail to the point where it enters the Glen Canyon National Recreation Area. The modern road is an important access route for visiting the Canyons of the Escalante and the Devils Garden. The trail is listed on the National Register of Historic Places, being added to that list in 1982.

The first ten miles of Hole-in-the-Rock Road were given a double chipseal coating in Spring 2026, amid controversy.

== Route description ==
The trail follows a 180-mile (290 km) route starting near Escalante, Utah, and ending in Bluff, Utah, and is named for the place where the San Juan Mission of Mormon pioneers constructed a descent to the Colorado River. The natural crevice on the 1,000-foot (300 m) cliff above the Colorado was enlarged by the party to lower the wagons down to river level, where it could be forded. The portion of the trail below the Hole-In-The-Rock is now flooded by Lake Powell. After the river crossing the trail continued past the Register Rocks, where the settlers recorded their names, now covered by the lake. The road rises through the Chute and across slickrock sandstone to Grey Mesa. Another difficult descent was required from Grey Mesa, requiring the party to cut a road from one ledge to another on the face of the mesa, taking a week. Another week was spent in constructing a road down Clay Hill Pass. Further on, blocked by Comb Ridge, the trail follows Comb Wash to San Juan Hill, where yet another road was built up the hill. The trail ends in Bluff.

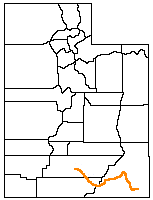
Entire trail - Escalante (left) to Bluff (right)

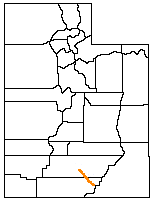
Current Hole-in-the-Rock Road - Escalante to the Hole-in-the-Rock

== Gallery ==
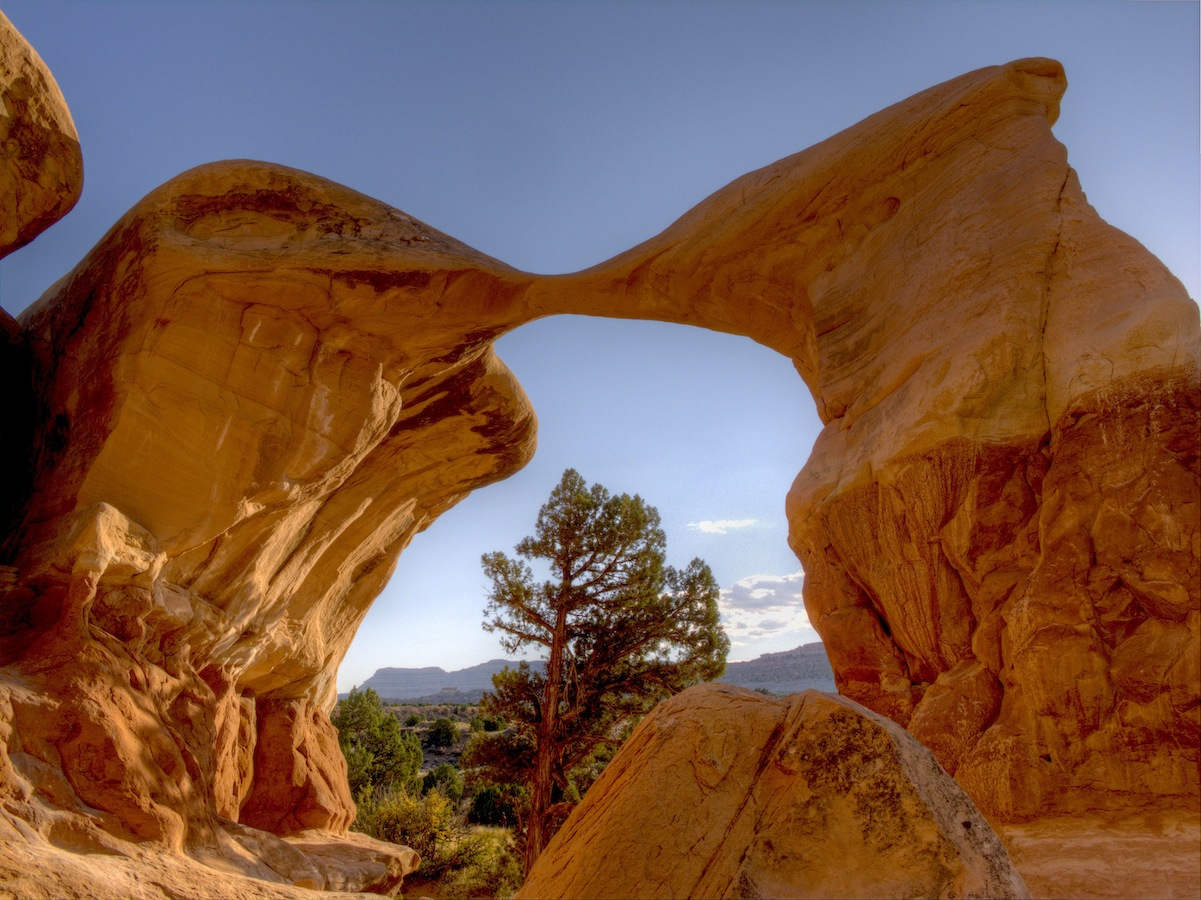
Metate Arch in Devils Garden

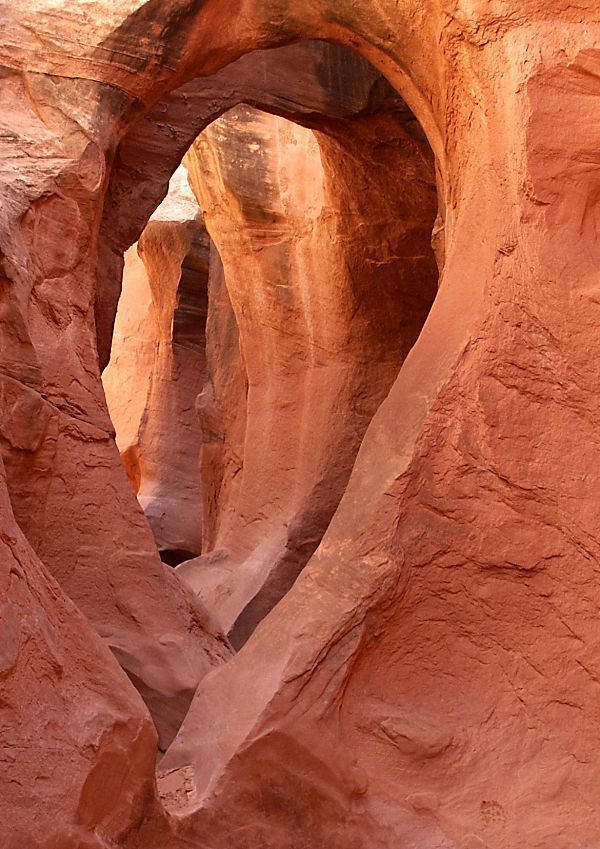
Peek-a-Boo Gulch

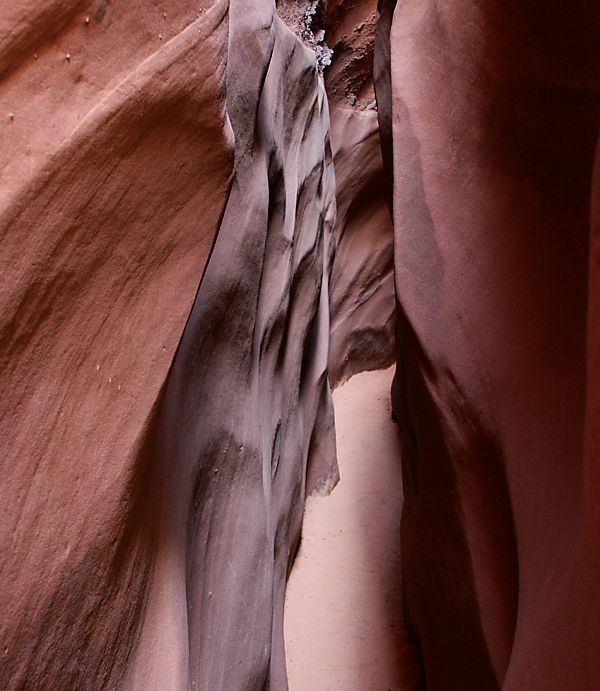
Spooky Gulch (video)

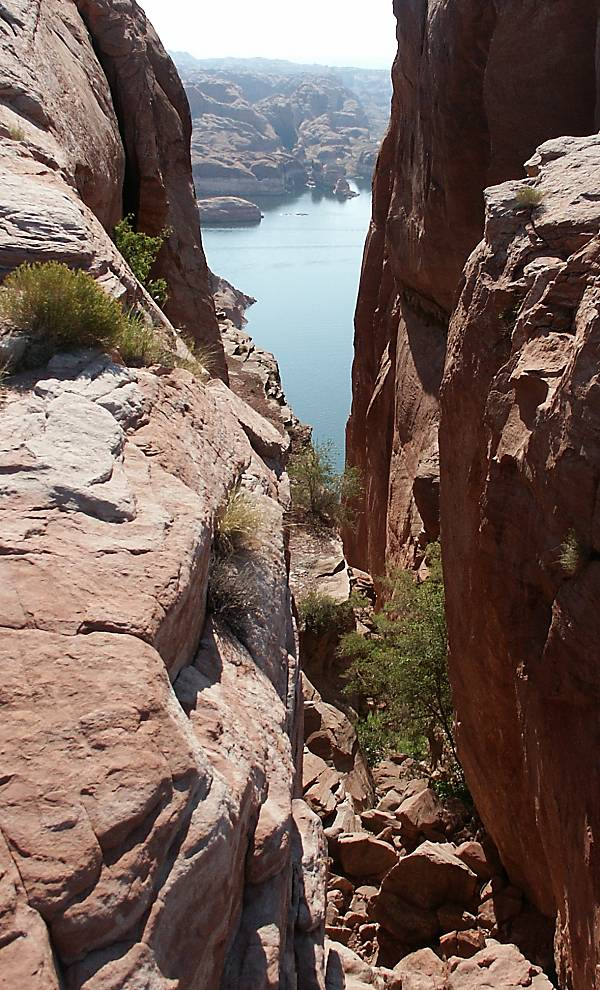
Hole-in-the-Rock, looking down at Lake Powell

== See also ==
- National Register of Historic Places listings in Garfield County, Utah
- National Register of Historic Places listings in Kane County, Utah
- National Register of Historic Places listings in San Juan County, Utah
- San Juan Expedition
