= Hole in the Rock (rock formation) =

- U.S. National Register of Historic Places
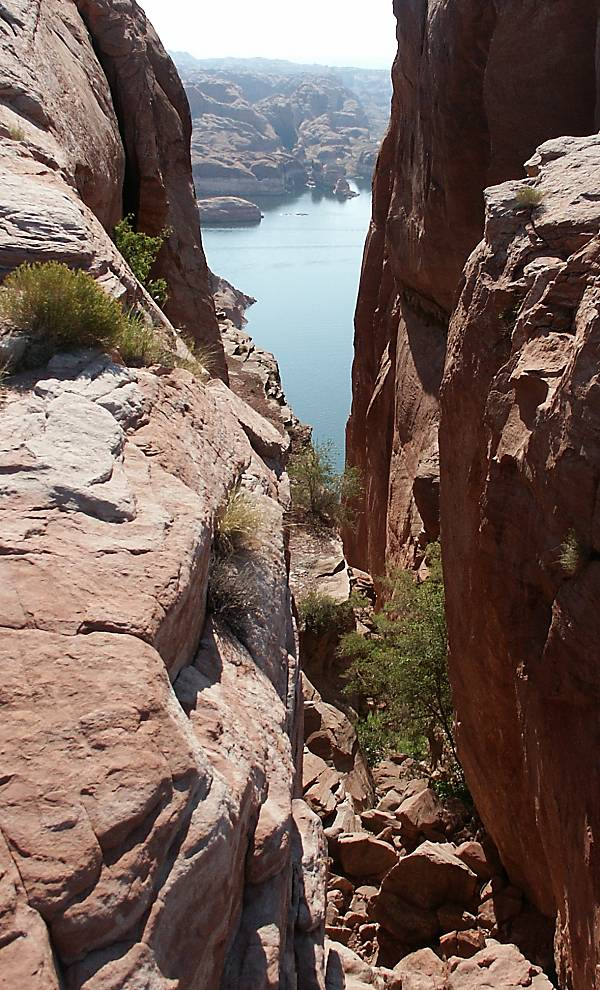
- Hole in the Rock, looking down at Lake Powell

- Location within Utah Location within the United States
- Location: SE of Escalante, in Glen Canyon National Recreation Area, Kane County, Utah, USA
- Coordinates: 37.2564°N 110.9002°W
- Built: 1879
- NRHP reference No.: 75000165
- Added to NRHP: November 03, 1975

Hole in the Rock is a narrow and steep crevice in the western rim of Glen Canyon, in southern Utah in the western United States. Together with another canyon on the eastern side of the Colorado River, it provided a route through what would otherwise be a large area of impassable terrain.

In the fall of 1879, the San Juan Expedition of the Church of Jesus Christ of Latter-day Saints was seeking a route from south-central Utah to their proposed colony in the far southeastern corner of the state. Rejecting two longer routes, they chose a more direct path that initially took them along the relatively benign terrain beneath the Straight Cliffs of the Kaiparowits Plateau. However, when this led them to the 1200-foot (400 m) sandstone cliffs that surround Glen Canyon, they needed a way to cross to the eastern rim. They found (and named) Hole in the Rock, a narrow, steep, and rocky crevice and sandy slope that led down to the river. Directly across the river was Cottonwood Canyon, a tempting route up to Wilson Mesa on the other side.

They worked for months to prepare the road, using blasting powder to widen the upper section and hand chisels to carve anchor points directly into the sandstone. On January 26, 1880, the expedition (250 people, 83 full-sized wagons, and over 1000 head of livestock) began their descent to the river. Wagons were heavily roped, and teams of men and oxen were used to lower the wagons through the upper crevice, which has slopes approaching 45°. Further down, a wooden track had been constructed along a slickrock sandstone slope. Posts in drilled holes supported horizontal beams to allow passage of the wagons.

After an even more difficult journey on the east side of the river, the expedition founded the community of Bluff in southeastern Utah. They used the Hole in the Rock route as a supply road for only a year before replacing it with an easier route to the north, at Hall's Crossing. Decades later, miners of the Hoskaninni Mining Company carved steps onto the same path used by the Mormon pioneers. The blasting holes, anchor points, and gouges from the hubs of the expedition's wagons are still visible in the walls of the crevice.

Hole in the Rock can be reached today via two routes. The primitive Hole in the Rock Trail, which closely follows the path of the 1879 expedition, runs southeast from near the town of Escalante to a parking area just above the crevice. Alternatively, the bottom of the route can be accessed by boat, at buoy 66 on Lake Powell in the Glen Canyon National Recreation Area.

The Hole in the Rock was listed on the National Register of Historic Places in 1975.

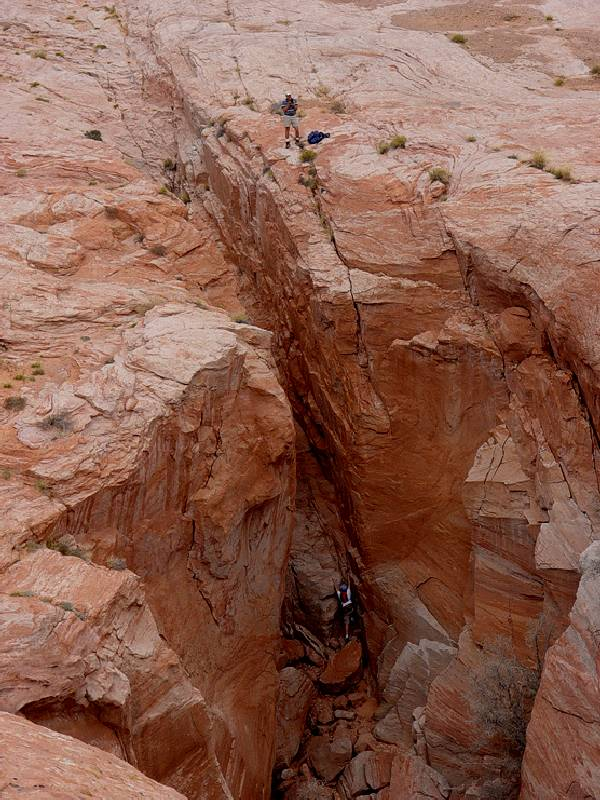
Hikers climb through the upper slot of Hole in the Rock (NPS).
