= Canyons of the Escalante =

Erosional landforms in Utah, United States

Coordinates: 37.428°N 110.981°W

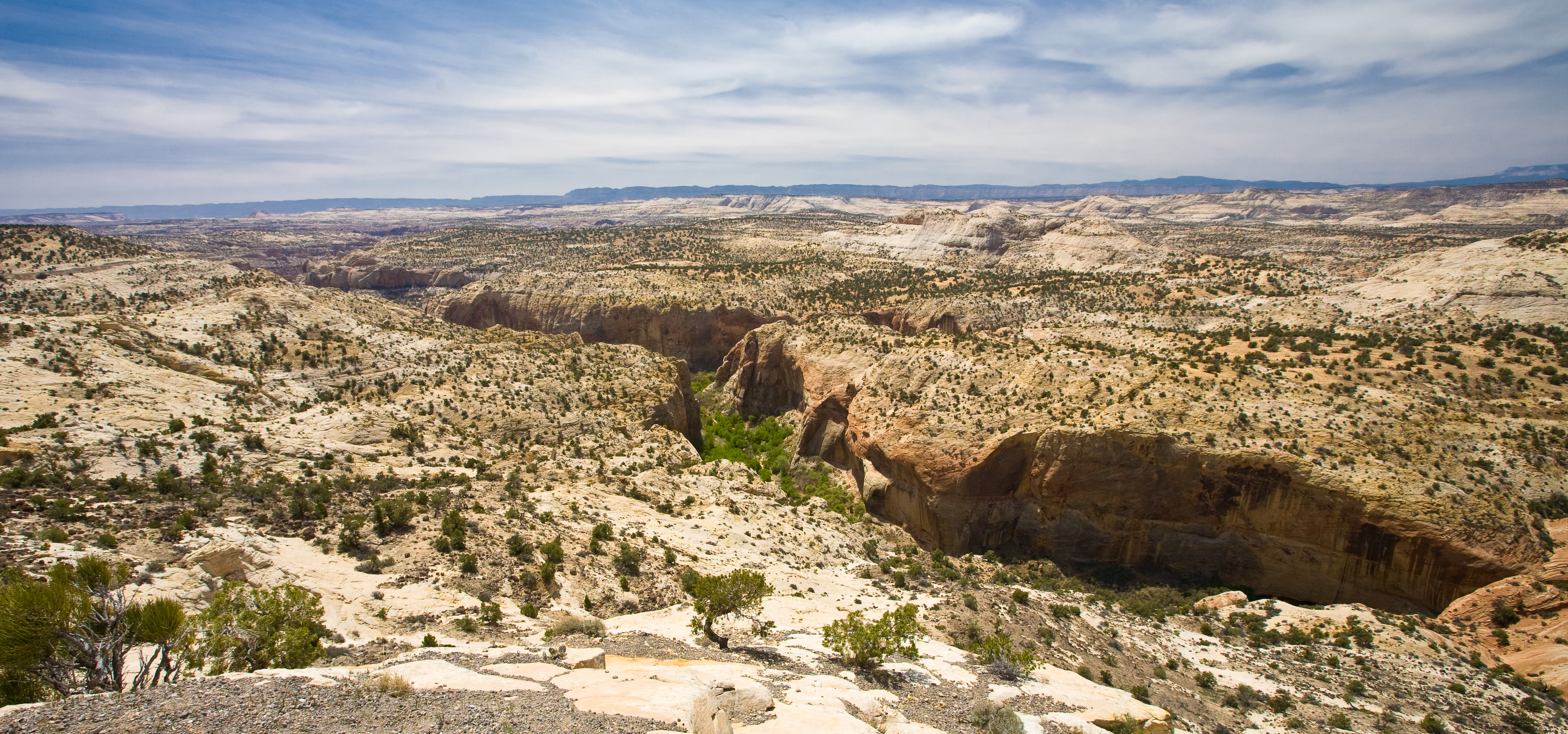
Calf Creek Canyon

The Canyons of the Escalante is a collective name for the erosional landforms created by the Escalante River and its tributaries—the Escalante River Basin. Located in southern Utah in the western United States, these sandstone features include high vertical canyon walls, numerous slot canyons, waterpockets (sandstone depressions containing temporary rainwater deposits), domes, hoodoos, natural arches and bridges. This area—extending over 1,500 square miles (3,885 km^{2}) and rising in elevation from 3,600 ft (1,097 m) to over 11,000 ft (3,353 m)—is one of the three main sections of the Grand Staircase–Escalante National Monument, and also a part of the Glen Canyon National Recreation Area, with Capitol Reef National Park being adjacent to the east.

== Geography ==
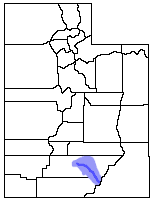
Location of the Canyons of the Escalante within Utah

The headwaters of the Escalante River are located on the slopes of the Aquarius Plateau, in Utah's Garfield County, just west of the town of Escalante. The Escalante River begins at the confluence of Birch Creek and North Creek, with the flow of Pine Creek added just below the town. The river runs a total distance of 80 mi (130 km) from the Birch/North Creek confluence before emptying into the Colorado River in Kane County. The lower section of the river, southeast of Coyote Gulch, is now beneath the surface of Lake Powell.

Numerous side canyons also feed the main river, accounting for the large size of the basin. From the west, the major tributaries are Harris Wash, Twentyfive Mile Creek, Coyote Gulch, Fortymile Gulch, and Fiftymile Creek, along with the smaller Phipps, Fence, and Scorpion, Davis, Clear, and Indian Creeks. Most of these larger creeks flow from the top of the Kaiparowits Plateau or from the base of its eastern edge, the Straight Cliffs Formation. An even greater number of tributaries flow in from the north and east, including Death Hollow and Calf Creeks, the combined Boulder and Deer Creeks, The Gulch, Wolverine and Silver Falls Creeks, and Choprock, Moody, Stevens, and Cow Canyons. Streams from the north flow from Boulder Mountain, while those from the northeast originate in the Circle Cliffs area, near the Waterpocket Fold in Capitol Reef National Park.

== Geology ==
The sandstone layers now exposed in the Canyons of the Escalante were deposited during the Mesozoic era, 180 to 225 million years ago, when this area was part of a vast dune field. Near the end of the Cretaceous period, about 80 million years ago, the entire western section of North America entered an era of uplift and mountain-building, an event known as the Laramide orogeny. More recently, additional uplift formed the Colorado Plateau province. These episodes of uplift raised the Aquarius Plateau to the extent that erosional solid forces were acting on the Escalante River Basin. Wetter climates during the recent ice ages of the Pleistocene period contributed to the deep cutting of the canyon walls.

Sandstone exposed in canyons nearer to the Colorado River is typically from the Glen Canyon Group. The dark red cliffs of Coyote Gulch, for example, are composed of Navajo Sandstone. The lighter sandstone domes of Dance Hall Rock and Sooner Rocks are formed from the higher Entrada sandstone layer. Due to the tilting of layers throughout the area, sandstone exposed at higher elevations near the town of Escalante (e.g. Deer Creek) may be from a lower layer, Wingate Sandstone.

== Gallery ==
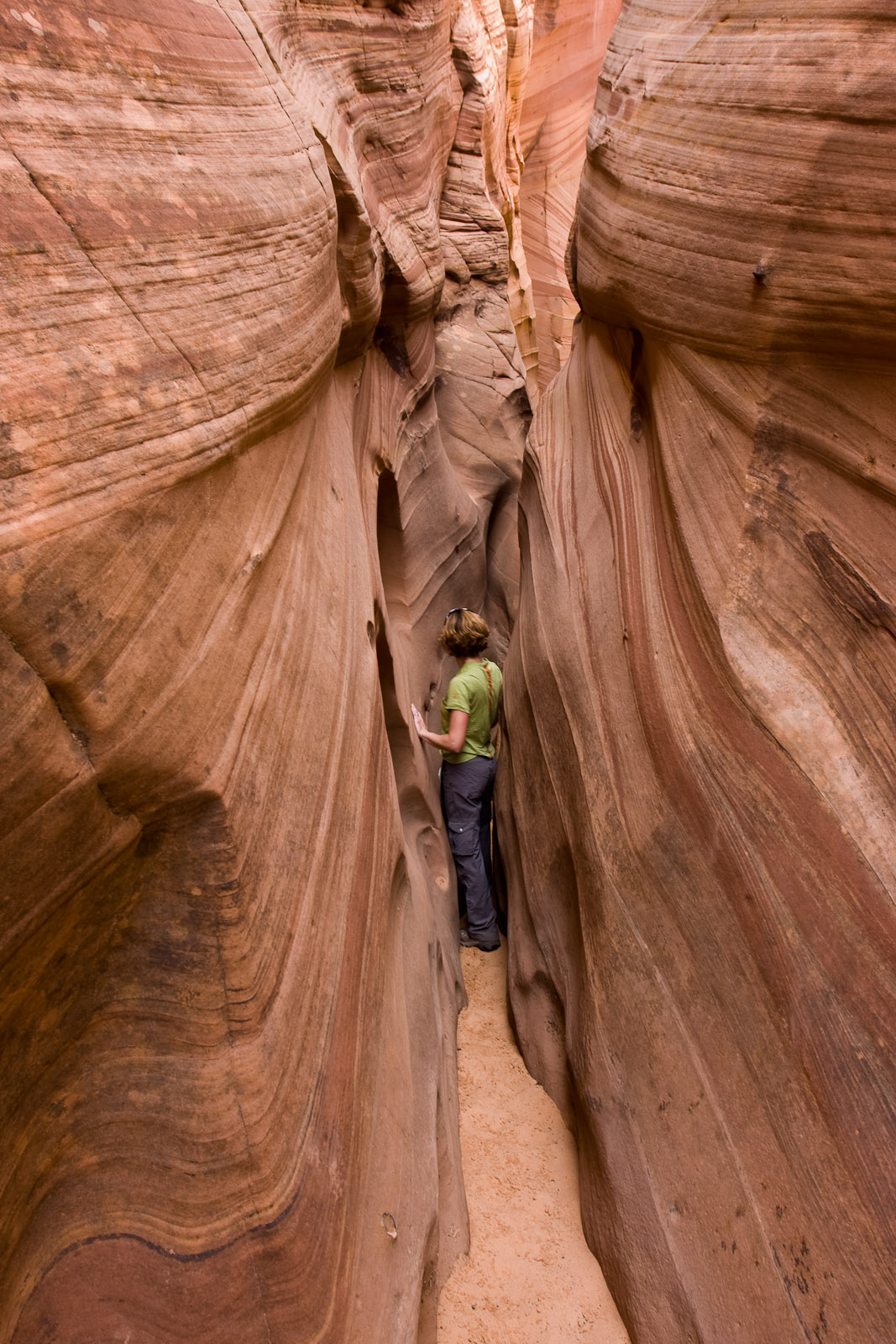
Zebra Canyon

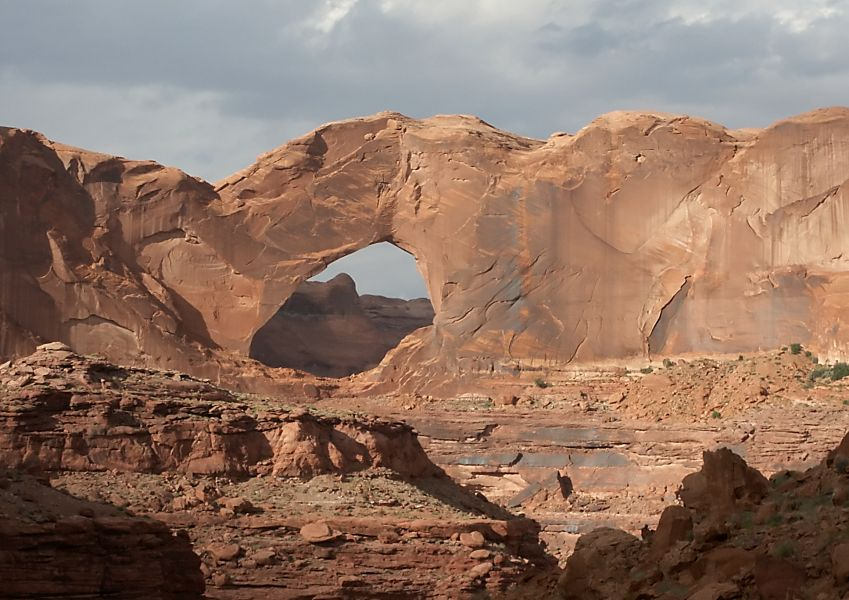
Stevens Arch, near the mouth of Coyote Gulch

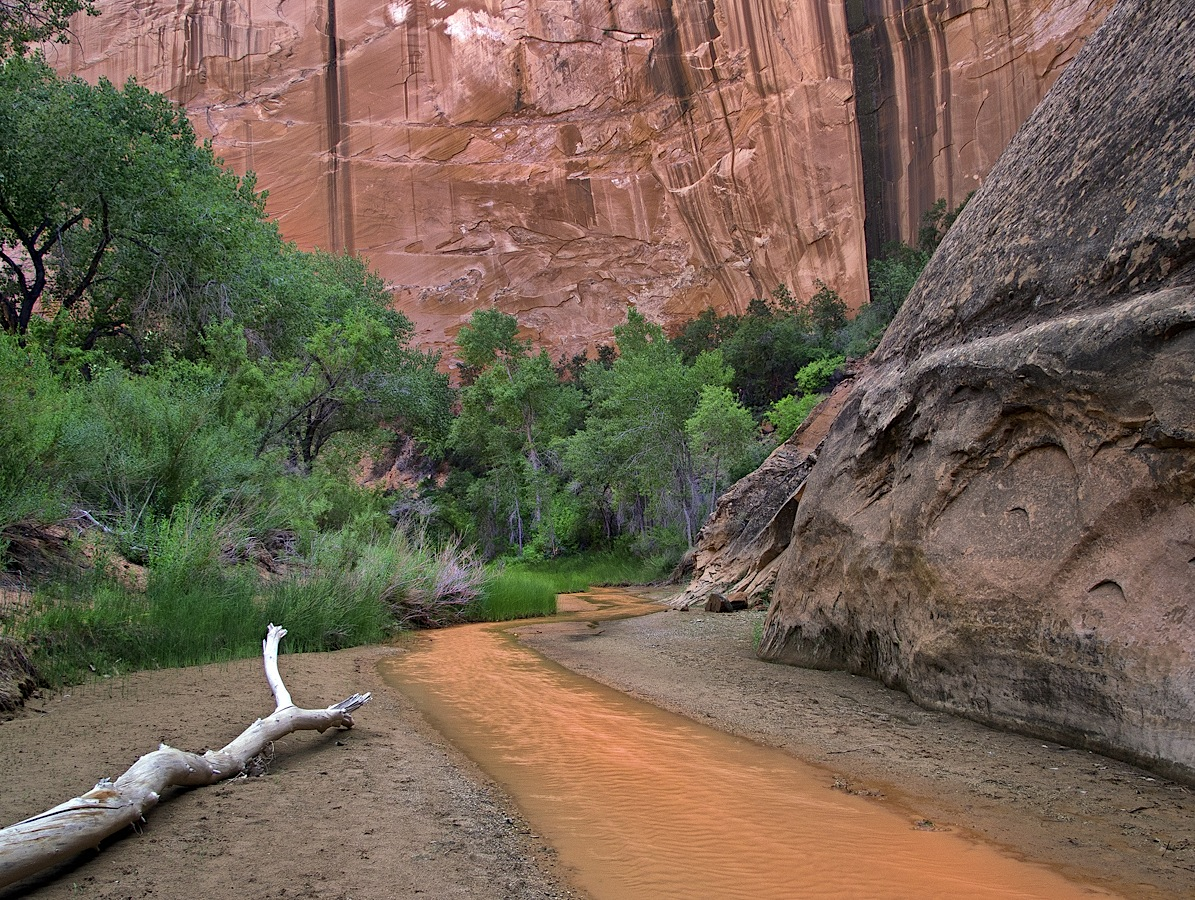
Canyon walls and stream-bed in Coyote Gulch

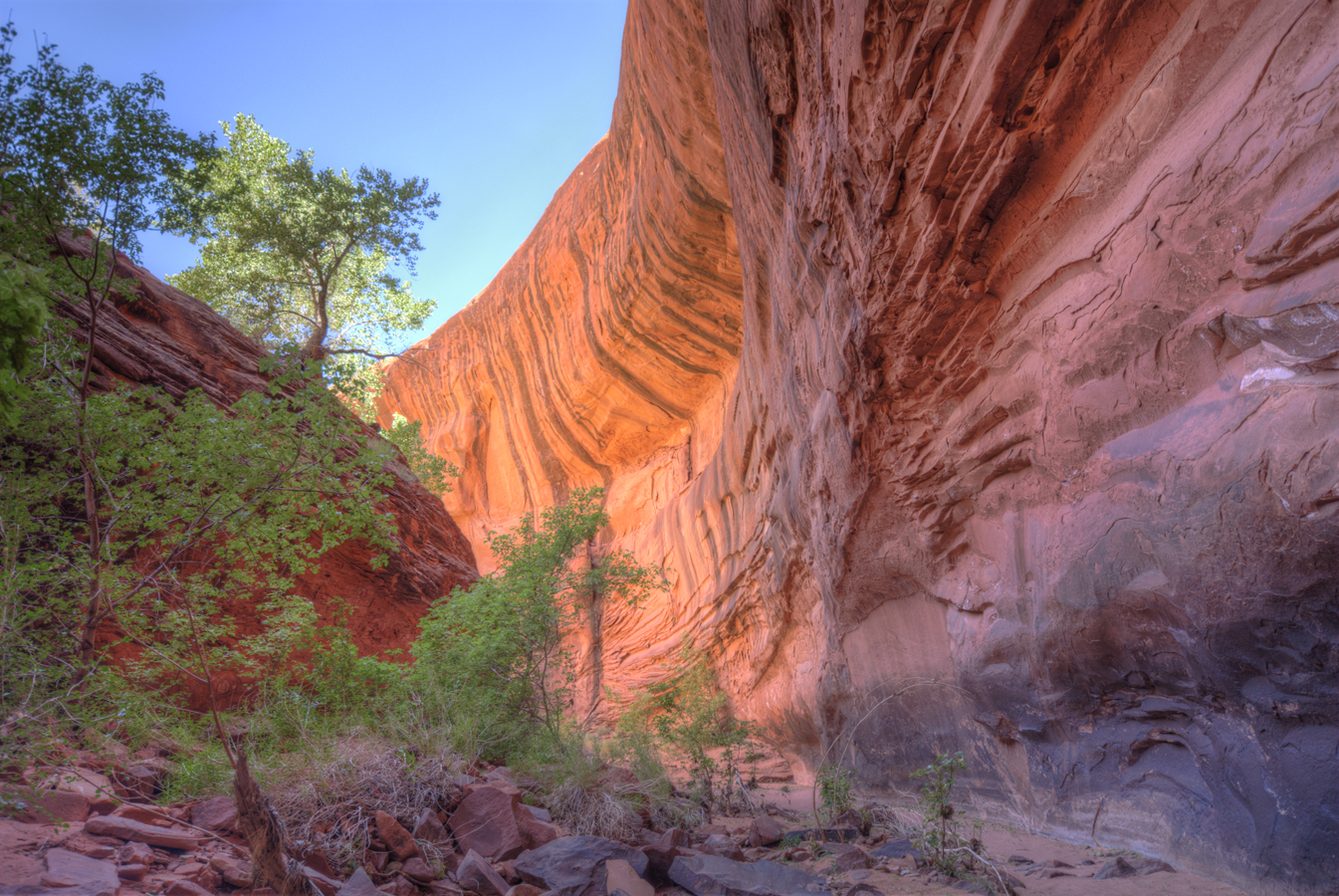
Neon Canyon

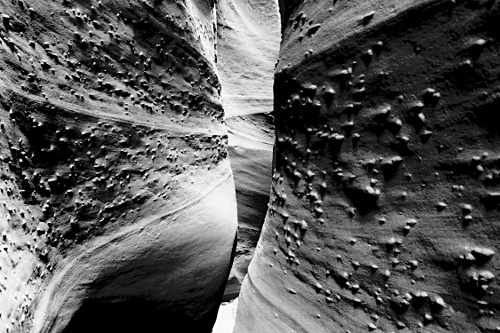
Spooky Gulch

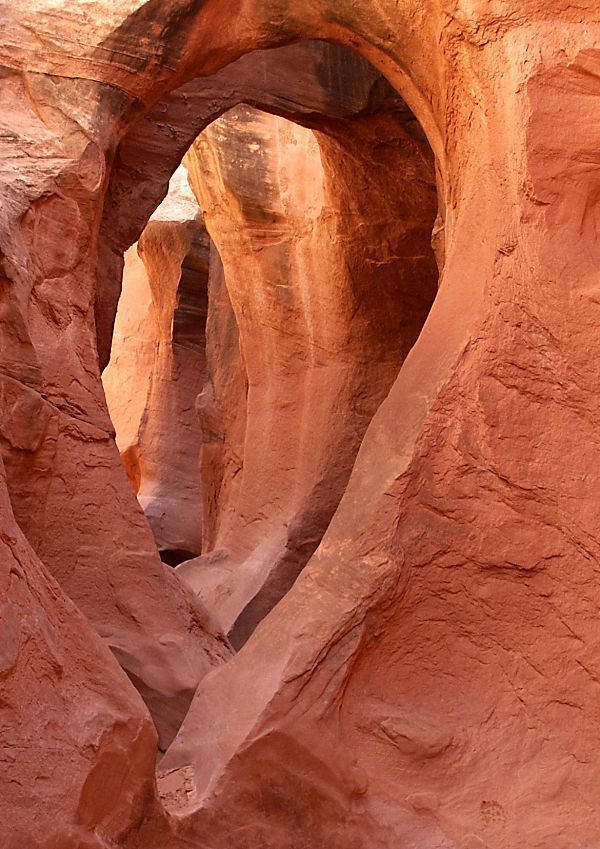
Peek-a-Boo Gulch

Video of Spooky Gulch

== See also ==
- Calf Creek Falls
- Devils Garden
- Geology of the Bryce Canyon area - to the west of the basin
- Geology of the Capitol Reef area - to the east of the basin
- Hole in the Rock Trail - unpaved access road to the canyons
- Utah State Route 12 - only paved highway through the basin

== Bibliography ==
- Hiking the Escalante, by Rudi Lambrechtse (1985), ISBN 0-915272-27-X
- Canyon Hiking Guide to the Colorado Plateau, by Michael R. Kelsey (1995), ISBN 0-944510-11-6
- Canyons of the Escalante, Trails Illustrated Map (1994), ISBN 0-925873-98-5
- Escalente Canyon - Wilderness at the Crossroads, National Geographic, August 1972
