= Escalante, Utah =

City in Utah, United States

- City
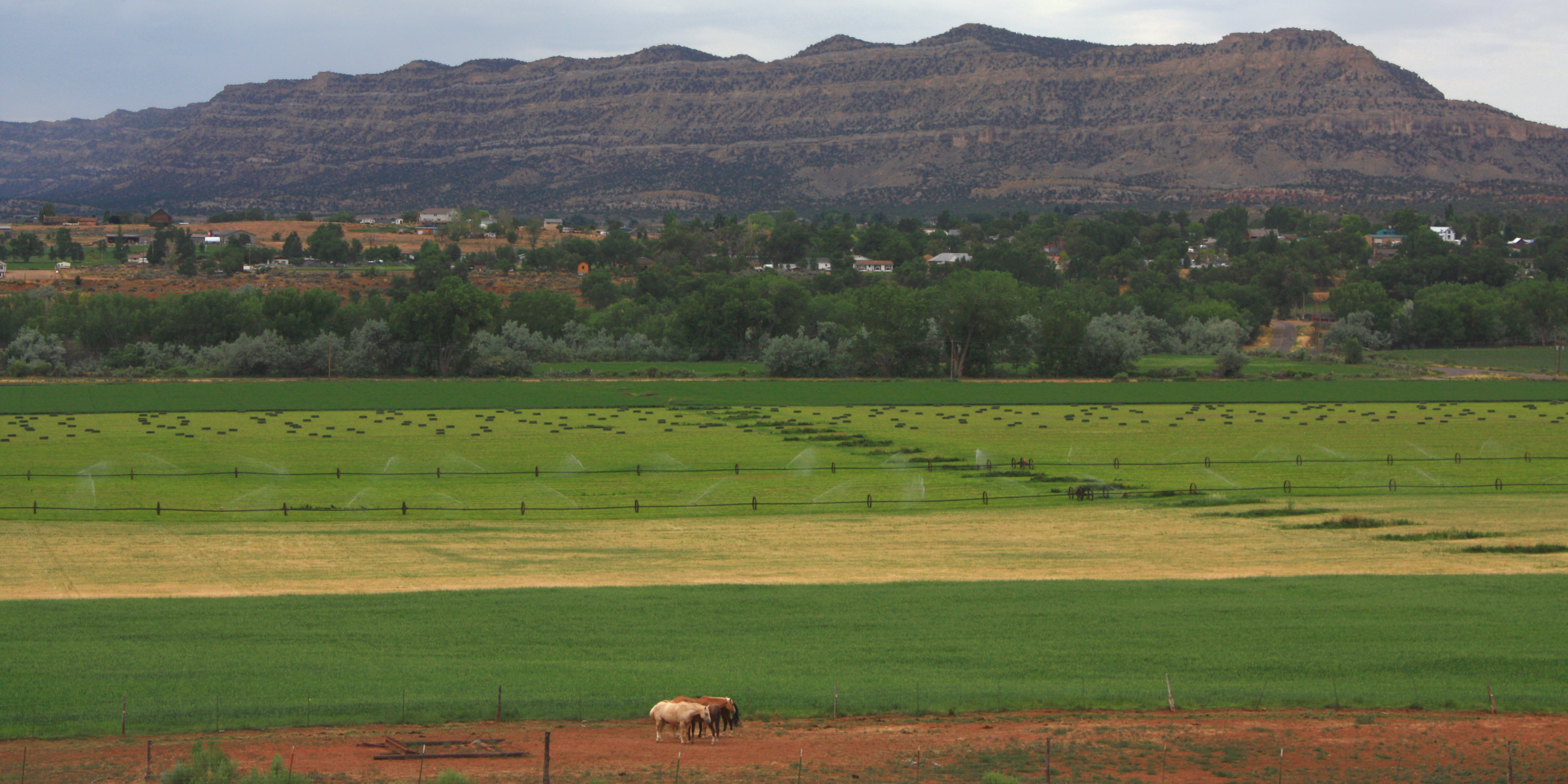
- Escalante and the Straight Cliffs from the north

- Location in Garfield County and state of Utah
- Coordinates: 37°46′13″N 111°36′8″W
- Country: United States
- State: Utah
- County: Garfield
- Settled: 1875
- Named for: Silvestre Vélez de Escalante

Government
  - Mayor: Mayor Melani Torgersen
  - Town Clerk: Stephanie Steed

Area
  - Total: 3.30 sq mi (8.55 km^{2})
  - Land: 3.30 sq mi (8.55 km^{2})
  - Water: 0 sq mi (0.00 km^{2})
- Elevation: 5,820 ft (1,770 m)

Population (2020)
  - Total: 786
  - Estimate (2019): 798
  - Density: 241.7/sq mi (93.33/km^{2})
- Time zone: UTC-7 (Mountain (MST))
  - Summer (DST): UTC-6 (MDT)
- ZIP code: 84726
- Area code: 435
- FIPS code: 49-23750
- GNIS feature ID: 2410452
- Website: escalanteutah.gov

Escalante (locally /ˌɛskəˈlænt(i)/) is a city in central Garfield County, Utah, United States, located along Utah Scenic Byway 12 (SR-12) in the south-central part of the state. As of the 2020 census, 786 people were living in the city.

The city is named after Silvestre Vélez de Escalante, a Franciscan missionary and a member of the first European expedition into what is now southern Utah.

The nearest towns are Boulder which is 27 miles (43 km) to the northeast on SR-12, and Henrieville, which is 30 miles (48 km) to the southwest on SR-12.

The Escalante Petrified Forest State Park is located west of the city. Sections of the Grand Staircase–Escalante National Monument (GSENM) abut much of the city's limits. The Hole-in-the-Rock Road, which begins 5 mi (8.0 km) east of Escalante, is the main access road into the eastern section of GSENM. The road leads to the Canyons of the Escalante, the Devils Garden and the Hole-in-the-Rock.

== History ==
In 1776, Silvestre Vélez de Escalante and Francisco Atanasio Domínguez left Santa Fe, New Mexico attempting to find a route to the missions of California. The Dominguez–Escalante Expedition followed a route north through western Colorado, west across central Utah, and then southwest through what is now called the Escalante Desert, finally circling back to the east after reaching Arizona near the north rim of the Grand Canyon. They returned to Santa Fe having never entered California or the areas near the city of Escalante. In 1866; Captain James Andrus led members of the Southern Utah militia through the Escalante area during the Black Hawk Indian War. The valley east of the Escalante Mountains, where the city of Escalante is located, was named Potato Valley since the group had found wild potatoes growing there.

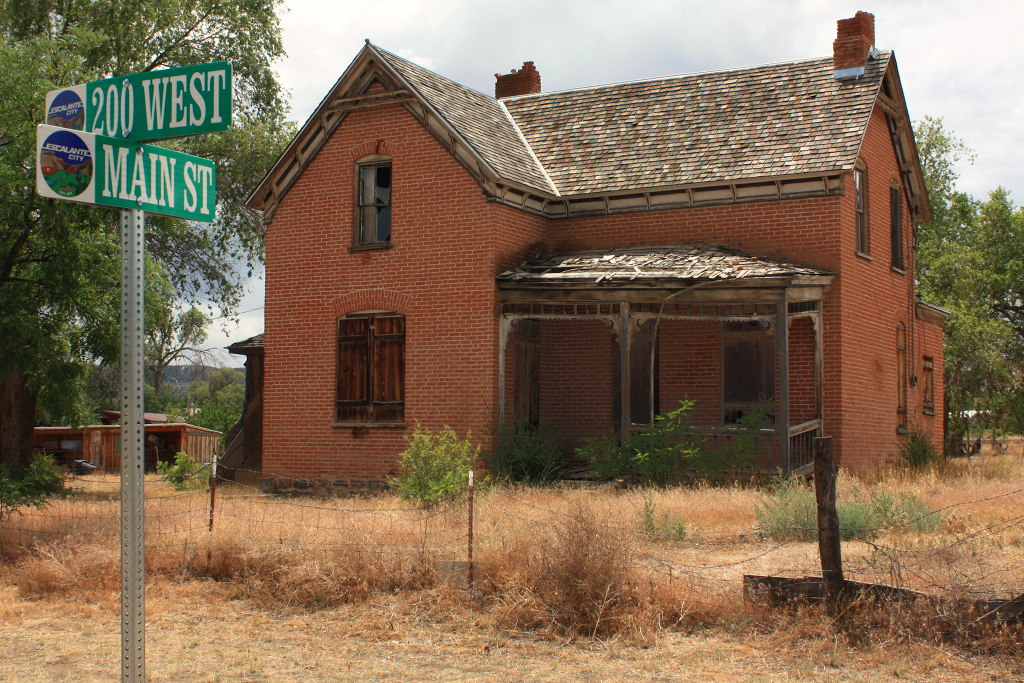
Brick house on Main Street

Settlers from Panguitch first visited the area in the 1870s, where they met members of the John Wesley Powell expedition. The settlement was named based on a suggestion of Powell's group to honor Escalante even though the expedition had not traveled into the valley. In June 1875, the settlers returned to survey the valley. Twenty-acre parcels were staked out for farming while city lots were also marked. After a winter spent back in Panguitch, the settlers returned, and the first home was built in March 1876 by William Alvey. The first settlers built many homes using native bricks, and as a result, those homes are still standing today.

The primary industries of the new settlement of Escalante were cattle and sheep ranching, dairy farming, logging and mining. Farming and ranching continue to drive the local economy today, along with increasing tourist-related activities. In the 1930s, the Civilian Conservation Corps (CCC) built improved roads to Posey Lake and Boulder. Federal government management of large tracts of surrounding lands had begun, and stricter regulation of public lands combined with limited private land resources caused many people to leave Escalante in the 1940s.

Main Street, SR-12
view west and east
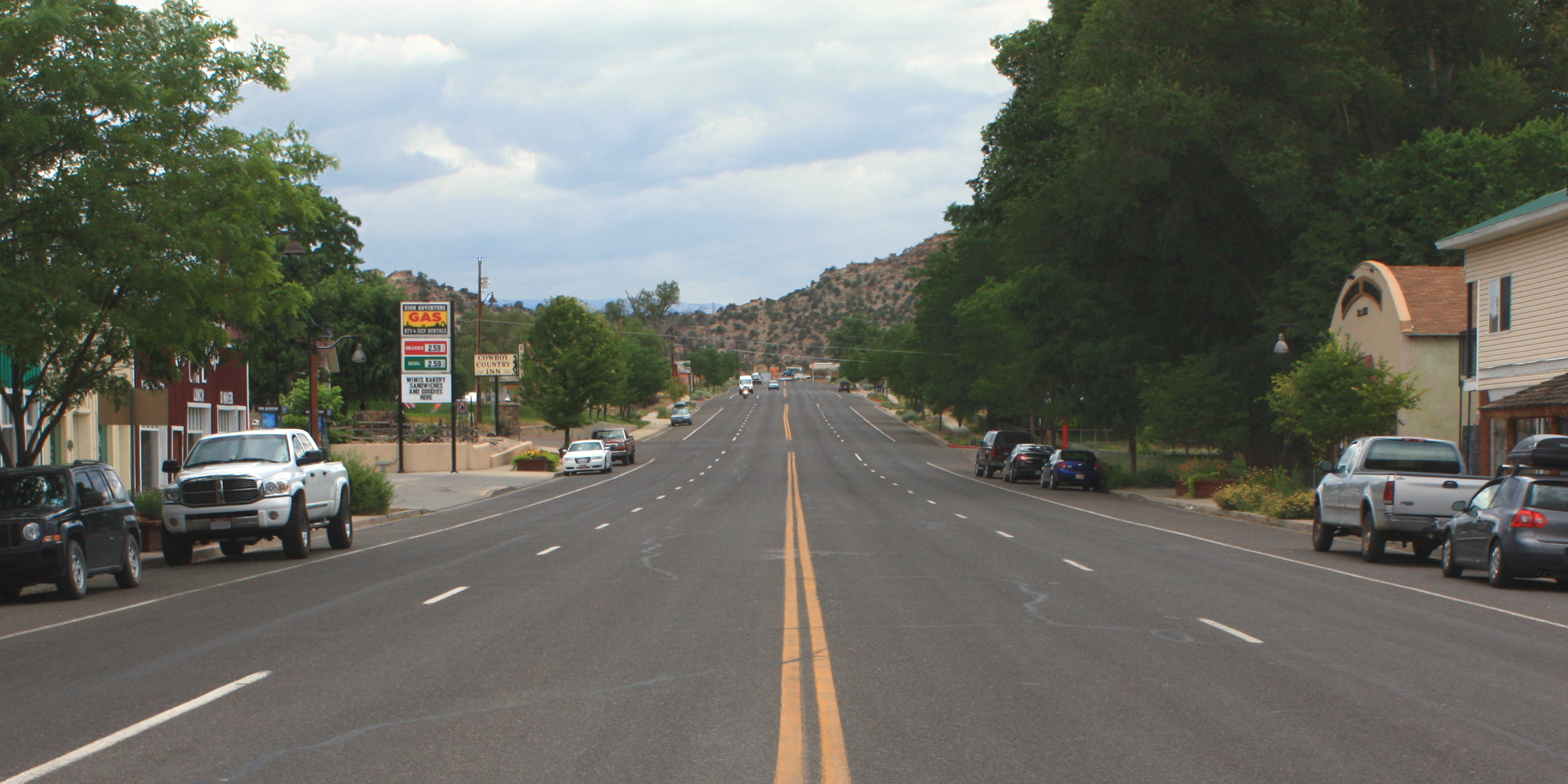
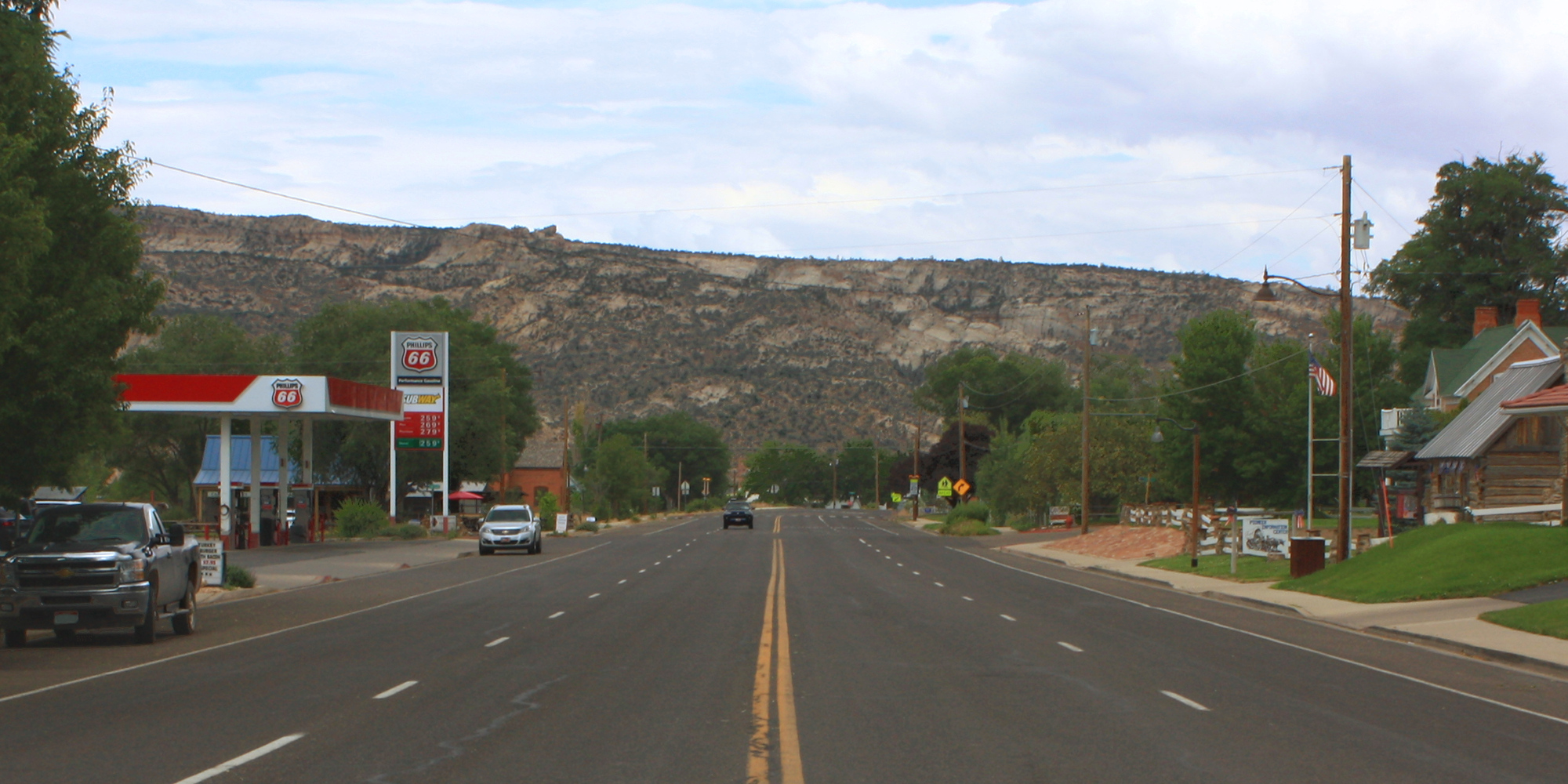

The exodus to larger communities for work resulted in a 33% population loss by the 1950 census. The population continued to decline through the next two decades, dropping to as low as 638 people, leaving only 15 more people than in the very first census in 1880. The population increased by 25% by the 1990 census, then remained unchanged in the 2000 census and declined slightly in the 2010 census.

Since the Grand Staircase–Escalante National Monument (GSENM) was established in 1996, Escalante has seen a large increase in tourists, especially from spring through fall. A survey taken from March to October 2004 by Utah State University claims that the BLM has an estimated 600,000 visitors to various parts of GSENM, many of whom pass through Escalante.

== Demographics ==
Historical population
Census	Pop.	Note	%±
1880	623		—
1890	667		7.1%
1900	723		8.4%
1910	846		17.0%
1920	1,032		22.0%
1930	1,016		−1.6%
1940	1,161		14.3%
1950	773		−33.4%
1960	702		−9.2%
1970	638		−9.1%
1980	652		2.2%
1990	818		25.5%
2000	818		0.0%
2010	797		−2.6%
2020	786		−1.4%
2019 (est.)	798		0.1%
U.S. Decennial Census

=== 2020 census ===
As of the 2020 census, Escalante had a population of 786. The median age was 47.1 years. 21.4% of residents were under the age of 18 and 25.8% of residents were 65 years of age or older. For every 100 females there were 104.7 males, and for every 100 females age 18 and over there were 109.5 males age 18 and over.

0.0% of residents lived in urban areas, while 100.0% lived in rural areas.

There were 341 households in Escalante, of which 24.0% had children under the age of 18 living in them. Of all households, 51.9% were married-couple households, 22.9% were households with a male householder and no spouse or partner present, and 21.4% were households with a female householder and no spouse or partner present. About 29.0% of all households were made up of individuals and 12.9% had someone living alone who was 65 years of age or older.

There were 446 housing units, of which 23.5% were vacant. The homeowner vacancy rate was 3.9% and the rental vacancy rate was 6.8%.

Racial composition as of the 2020 census
Race	Number	Percent
White	742	94.4%
Black or African American	2	0.3%
American Indian and Alaska Native	11	1.4%
Asian	4	0.5%
Native Hawaiian and Other Pacific Islander	0	0.0%
Some other race	17	2.2%
Two or more races	10	1.3%
Hispanic or Latino (of any race)	31	3.9%

=== 2010 census ===
As of the 2010 census, 797 people, 334 households, and 217 families lived in the city. The population density was 271 people per square mile (105/km^{2}). There were 420 housing units at an average density of 143 per square mile (55/km^{2}). The racial makeup was 95.4% White, 2.1% American Indian and Alaska Native, 0.5% Asian, 0.1% Black, 0.1% Native Hawaiian, 1.5% from other races, 0.3% from mixed racial ancestry and 3.5% Hispanic or Latino of any race.

There were 334 households, out of which 22.2% had children under the age of 18 living with them, 57.2% were married couples living together, 4.8% had a female householder with no husband present, 3% had a male householder with no wife present, and 35% were non-families. 30.2% of all households were made up of individuals, and 12% had someone living alone who was 65 years or older. The average household size was 2.39, and the average family size was 3.03.

The population was spread out, with 22.1% under 18, 8.5% from 18 to 24, 9.7% from 25 to 34, 17.7% from 35 to 49, 24.2% from 50 to 64, and 17.8% who were 65 years of age or older. The median age was 44.9 years. For every 100 females, there were 109.2 males. For every 100 females age 18 and over, there were 101.6 males.

The median yearly income for a household was $38,929, and the median income for a family was $48,654. Males had a median income of $51,223 versus $27,500 for females. The per capita income was $27,648. About 14.5% of families and 14.8% of the population were below the poverty line ($11,490 for a single person household as of 2013) including 2.5% of those under age 18 and 25.3% of those age 65 or over.

== Geography ==
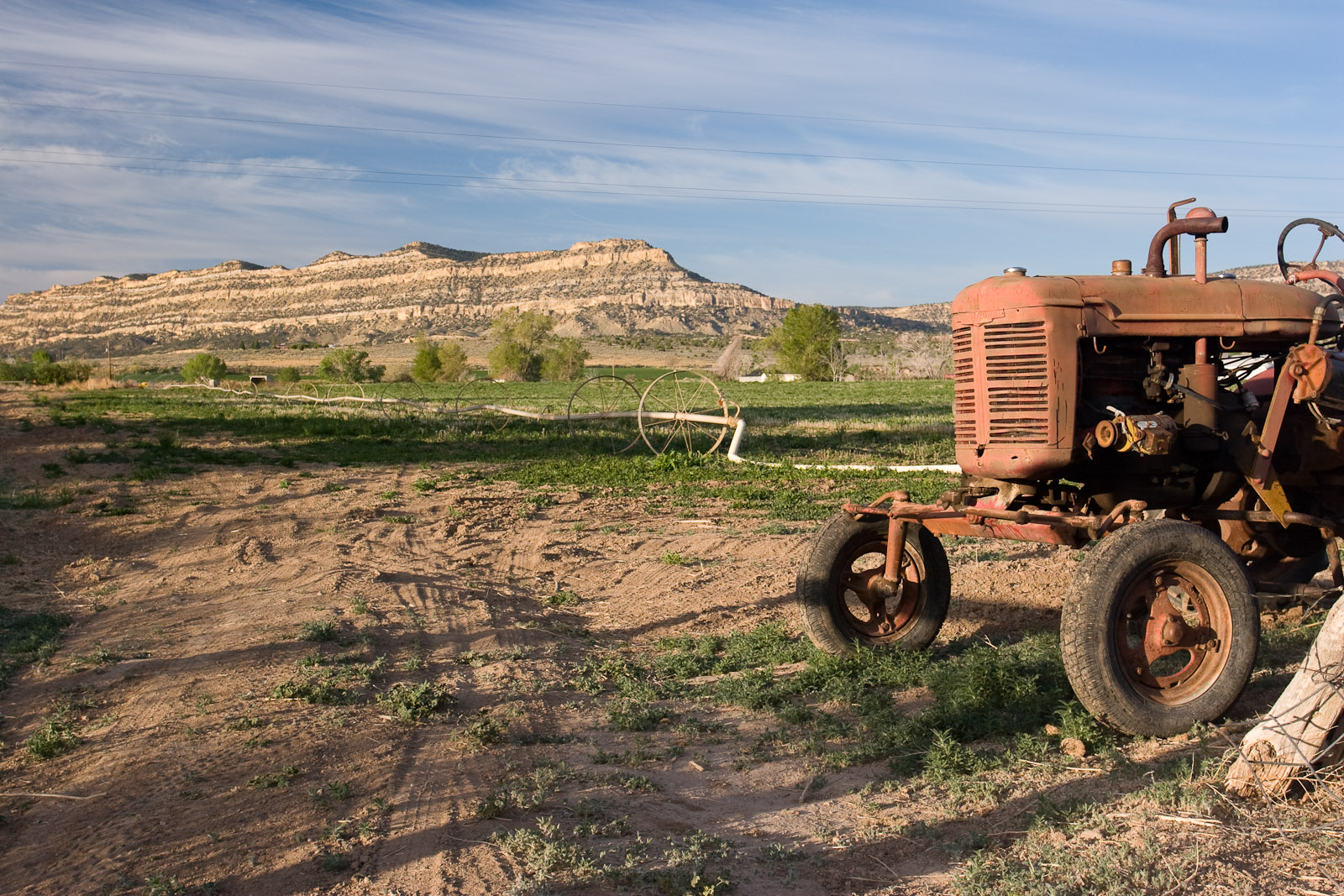
Straight Cliffs of the Grand Staircase–Escalante National Monument from Escalante

According to the United States Census Bureau, the city has a total area of 2.944 square miles (7.625 km^{2}), all land.

The mountains surround Escalante, cliffs, flats, washes and sandstone canyons of the Grand Staircase–Escalante National Monument (GSENM) and the Dixie National Forest.

The city lies within the Potato Valley as designated on the official USGS map. The Escalante River flows from the west, passing by the north side of the city and continuing eastward by an area named Big Flat. To the southeast of the city is the Canyons of the Escalante, the eastern part of GSENM, while directly south of the city is the Straight Cliffs formation which runs south-southeast to Lake Powell. The Kaiparowits Plateau, the middle part of GSENM, lies to the south and southwest of the city. To the city's west are the Dixie National Forest and the Escalante Mountains. To the city's north is a small part of GSENM, as well as the Box-Death Hollow Wilderness and the Aquarius Plateau, which are parts of the Dixie National Forest.

== Climate ==
Escalante has a cold semi-arid (steppe) climate, type "BSk" in the Köppen climate classification system. Average yearly precipitation is 10.56 in (268 mm) with most precipitation occurring from July to October with a peak in August of 1.64 in (42 mm). The driest month is June with an average of 0.40 in (10 mm). Snow falls mainly from November to April, with trace amounts occurring in October. The average yearly snowfall total is 25.5 in (65 cm).

July has the warmest average high temperatures at 92.3 °F (33.5 °C) while January has the coldest average low temperatures at 18.8 °F (−7.3 °C). The highest recorded temperature was 106 °F (41 °C) on July 9, 2021, and the lowest recorded temperature was −22 °F (−30 °C) on January 22, 1937.

The current weather forecast is available in the External links section.

Climate data for Escalante, Utah, 1991–2020 normals, extremes 1901–present
Month	Jan	Feb	Mar	Apr	May	Jun	Jul	Aug	Sep	Oct	Nov	Dec	Year
Record high °F (°C)	68 (20)	76 (24)	87 (31)	88 (31)	98 (37)	105 (41)	106 (41)	105 (41)	101 (38)	92 (33)	78 (26)	69 (21)	106 (41)
Mean daily maximum °F (°C)	43.1 (6.2)	48.0 (8.9)	58.0 (14.4)	65.5 (18.6)	75.5 (24.2)	87.1 (30.6)	92.3 (33.5)	89.1 (31.7)	81.3 (27.4)	68.3 (20.2)	53.8 (12.1)	42.9 (6.1)	67.1 (19.5)
Daily mean °F (°C)	30.9 (−0.6)	35.7 (2.1)	43.7 (6.5)	50.1 (10.1)	58.7 (14.8)	68.5 (20.3)	74.7 (23.7)	72.3 (22.4)	64.3 (17.9)	52.5 (11.4)	40.1 (4.5)	30.9 (−0.6)	51.9 (11.0)
Mean daily minimum °F (°C)	18.8 (−7.3)	23.3 (−4.8)	29.3 (−1.5)	34.8 (1.6)	41.9 (5.5)	50.0 (10.0)	57.1 (13.9)	55.5 (13.1)	47.4 (8.6)	36.8 (2.7)	26.4 (−3.1)	18.8 (−7.3)	36.7 (2.6)
Record low °F (°C)	−22 (−30)	−21 (−29)	2 (−17)	10 (−12)	23 (−5)	25 (−4)	38 (3)	32 (0)	16 (−9)	10 (−12)	−3 (−19)	−20 (−29)	−22 (−30)
Average precipitation inches (mm)	1.03 (26)	0.94 (24)	0.75 (19)	0.45 (11)	0.59 (15)	0.40 (10)	1.02 (26)	1.64 (42)	1.28 (33)	1.26 (32)	0.52 (13)	0.68 (17)	10.56 (268)
Average snowfall inches (cm)	8.9 (23)	5.8 (15)	2.2 (5.6)	1.4 (3.6)	0.0 (0.0)	0.0 (0.0)	0.0 (0.0)	0.0 (0.0)	0.0 (0.0)	0.1 (0.25)	1.9 (4.8)	5.2 (13)	25.5 (65)
Average precipitation days (≥ 0.01 in)	4.3	4.9	4.0	3.9	4.3	2.7	6.9	9.8	6.0	4.3	2.6	3.9	57.6
Average snowy days (≥ 0.1 in)	2.6	2.6	1.0	0.3	0.0	0.0	0.0	0.0	0.0	0.1	0.6	2.2	9.4
Source: NOAA

== See also ==
- List of municipalities in Utah
