= Kaiparowits Plateau =

Landform in Utah and Arizona, U.S.

Coordinates: 37.622°N 111.665°W

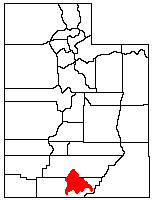
Location of the Kaiparowits Plateau within Utah

The Kaiparowits Plateau is a large, elevated landform located in southern Utah, in the southwestern United States. Along with the Grand Staircase and the Canyons of the Escalante, it makes up a significant portion of the Grand Staircase–Escalante National Monument. Its extension to the southeast, Fiftymile Mountain, runs nearly to the Colorado River and Lake Powell, and is a prominent part of the northern skyline from the Glen Canyon National Recreation Area.

== Geography ==
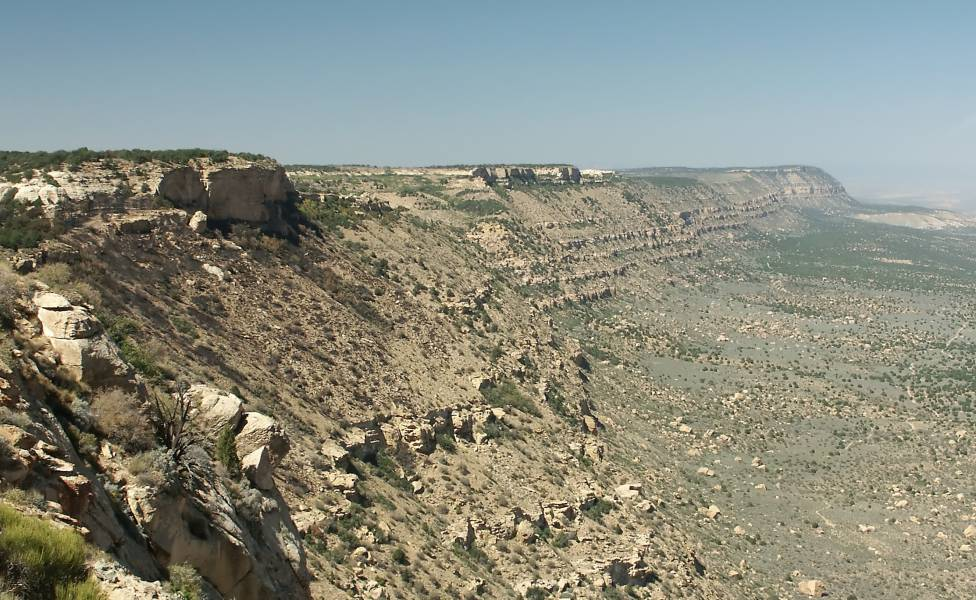
The Straight Cliffs, looking northwest from the eastern end of Fiftymile Mountain.

Roughly triangular in shape, the Kaiparowits Plateau extends for over 50 mi (80 km) from near the town of Escalante in Garfield County, to the south and southwest through Kane County and nearly to the border with Arizona. At its southeastern end, the plateau rises from Lake Powell nearly 4,000 ft (1,200 m) to an elevation of 7,584 ft (2,312 m). The northeastern edge of the plateau is defined by the Straight Cliffs, below which are the broad sandstone flats of the Escalante River. The western edge of the plateau is at the Paria River, Cottonwood Canyon, and the Cockscomb.

The southern end of the plateau is deeply dissected by tributaries of the Colorado River, including Rock, Last Chance, Warm, Wahweap, and Coyote Creeks. These canyons are now major side channels of Lake Powell. An extension of the plateau's high terrain is known as Smoky Mountain, the location of one of the few roads on the plateau. The northwestern end of the plateau is less well defined, essentially merging with the Aquarius Plateau. Canaan Peak, just south of Highway 12 and the town of Escalante, rises to 9,233 ft (2,814 m). Overall, the plateau covers an area of approximately 1,650 sq mi (4,300 km^{2}), much of it covered by pinyon-juniper woodland.

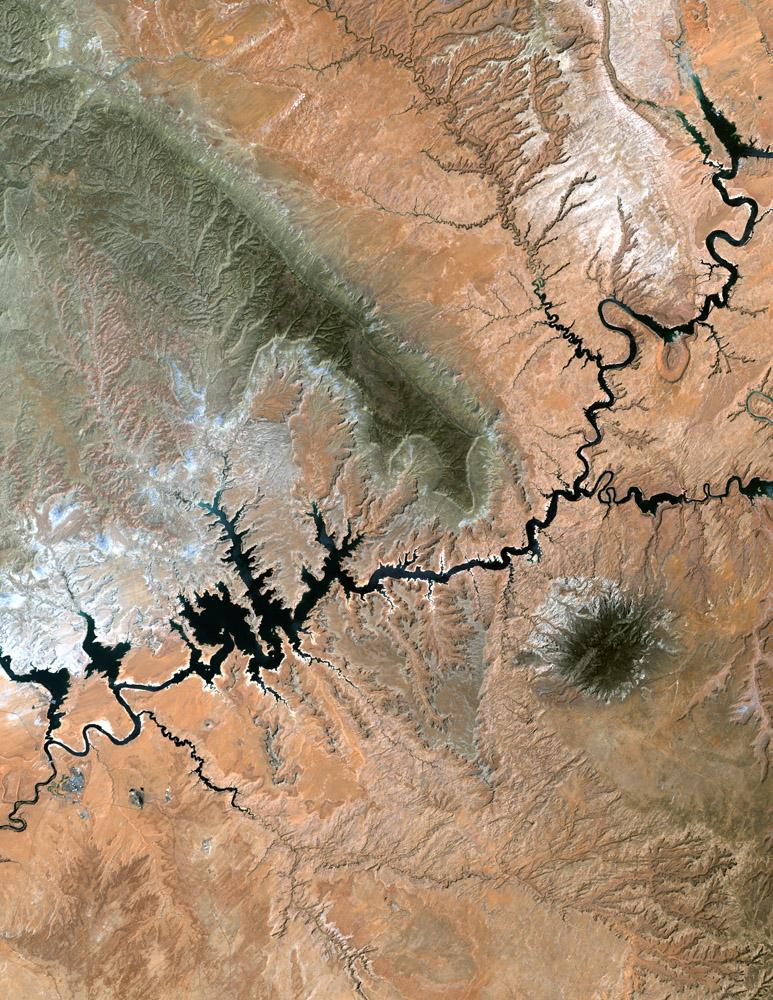
The Kaiparowits Plateau (green area in center), as seen from space (NASA)

This topography is well illustrated in a synthetic aerial image (here, 450 kB), which looks northwest from a point near Navajo Mountain. The Kaiparowits Plateau is the darker area to the left, while the Escalante River Basin is the lighter area to the right. The Colorado River (as Lake Powell) runs across the bottom of the image, and at the upper right is the Aquarius Plateau and Boulder Mountain.

== Geology ==
During the later part of the Cretaceous geologic period, the area that is now the Kaiparowits Plateau was located near the western shore of the Western Interior Seaway. The interior of the plateau was an area of peat swamps, while what is now the Straight Cliffs were at the shoreline. Further to the west was an area known as the Sevier Highlands. Erosion from the Highlands deposited approximately 1,500 ft (460 m) of what is now known as the Straight Cliffs Formation, a layer of sandstone that makes up the base of the plateau. Remnants of the peat are now seen as beds of coal within this layer. Later deposits during the Cretaceous period formed higher sandstone layers, known as the Wahweap and Kaiparowits Formations. Further deposition during later epochs formed layers that are now seen at the surface of the plateau, including the limestone layers of the Wasatch Formation.

== Fossils ==
The sandstone layers of the Kaiparowits Plateau have become a unique source of fossilized remains of the Late Cretaceous Period, vital to understanding the evolution of dinosaur and early mammalian species. These layers represent not only an unbroken sequence of the period between 70 and 82 million years ago, but have also preserved fine details of the bones, teeth, egg shells, and even the tracks of the animals that lived then. The skull of a ceratopsid, a horned dinosaur, was unearthed from the Wahweap Formation in 1998. A species of Struthiomimus, a toothless (yet carnivorous) dinosaur, was identified in the Kaiparowits Formation. As recently as 2007, the characterization of an unusual species of Gryposaurus, a duck-billed dinosaur, was announced. Fossils of the giant crocodilian Deinosuchus have also been found.

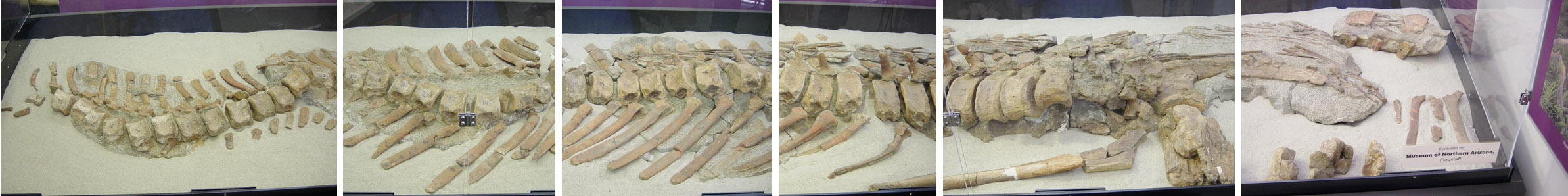
Fossilized skeleton of a young hadrosaur displayed at the Grand Staircase–Escalante National Monument

== Coal mining ==
Early settlers of the region mined certain parts of the plateau for coal in the 1870s and 1880s. The Spencer mine opened in 1913, reportedly to fuel gold mining activities along the Paria River.

In 1965, the Southern California Edison Company proposed the construction of a 3000 megawatt coal-fired generation plant within the Kaiparowits Plateau. This plant was intended to be fed by large coal deposits in the plateau, which may have yielded up to 4,000,000,000 short tons (3,600×10^{9} kg) of fuel. The electricity produced would have gone to the growing populations near Los Angeles, San Diego, and Phoenix. Initially hailed as an economic boon to this isolated area of southern Utah, the proposal met with growing opposition from federal regulatory agencies and from environmental groups, who had only recently experienced the scenic canyons of the Colorado River and its tributaries being inundated by Lake Powell, behind the Glen Canyon Dam. After ten years of dispute and facing rising construction costs, the proposal was abandoned in 1975.
