= Escalante River =

River in Garfield and Kane counties in Utah, United States

Coordinates: 37°17′22″N 110°52′20″W

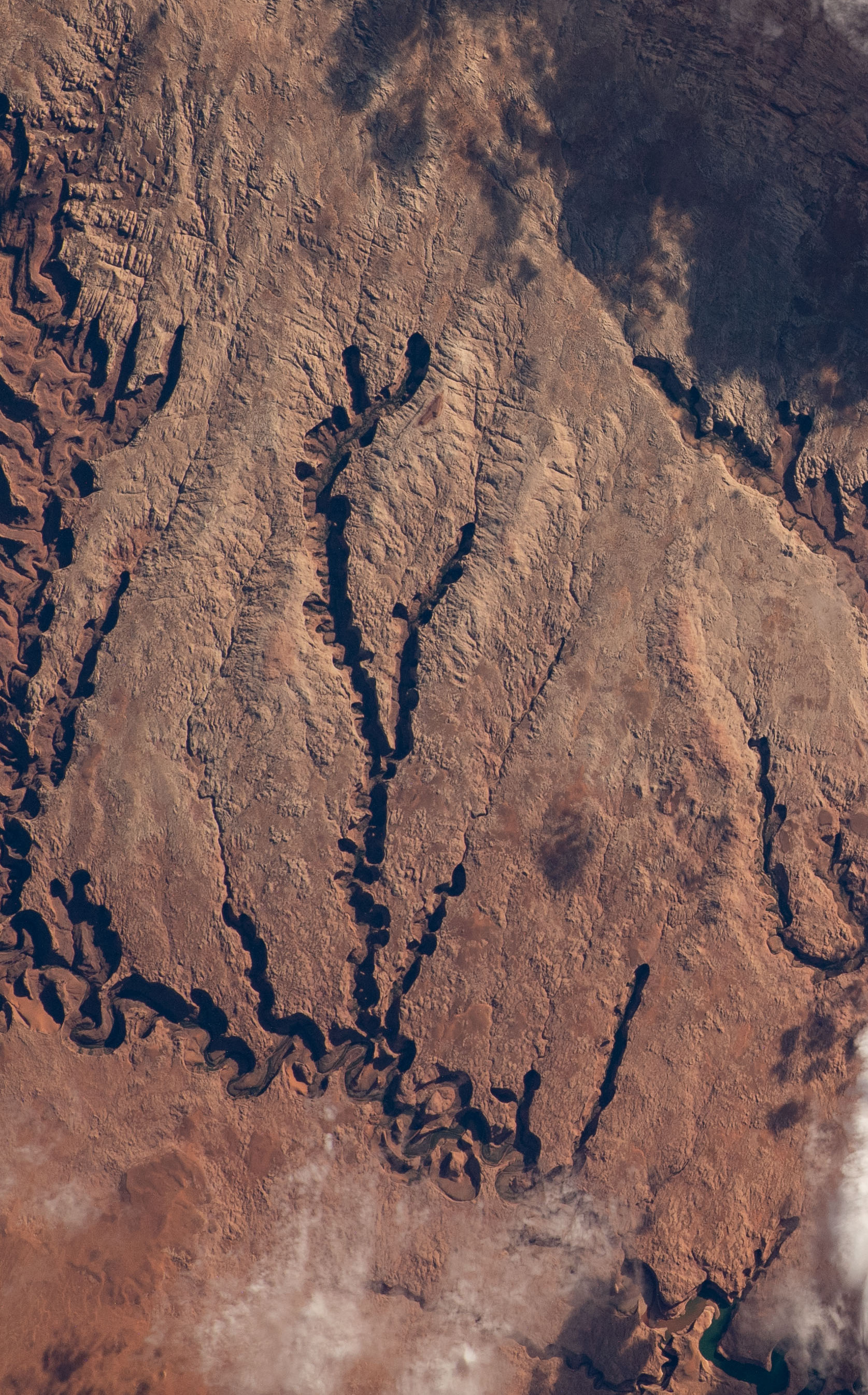
- View of part of the Escalante River, taken on July 4, 2022 from the International Space Station

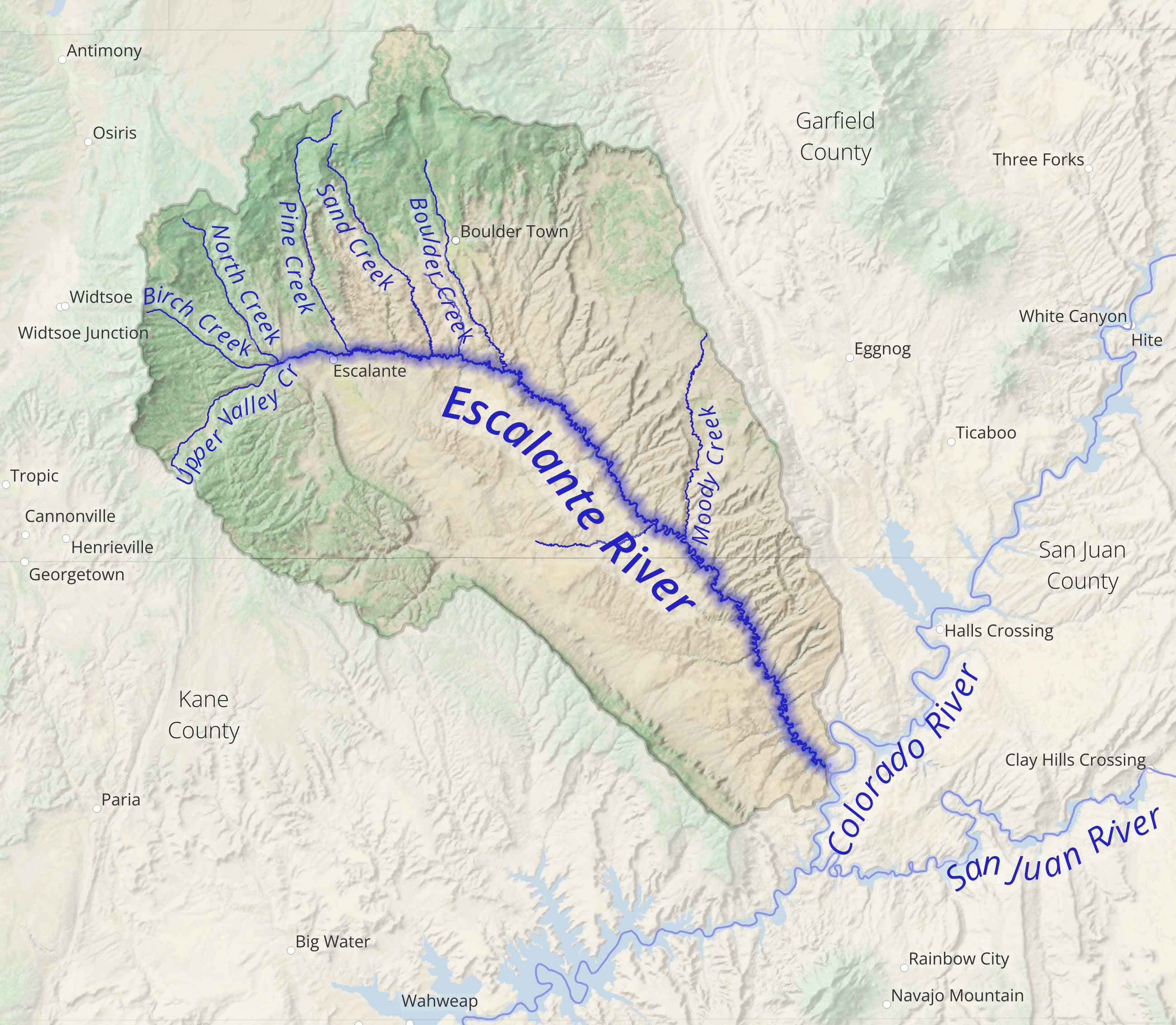
- Location of the Escalante River within Utah

Location
- Country: United States
- State: Utah

The Escalante River is a tributary of the Colorado River. It is formed by the confluence of Upper Valley and Birch Creeks near the town of Escalante in south-central Utah, and from there flows southeast for approximately 90 mi (140 km) before joining Lake Powell. Its watershed includes the high forested slopes of the Aquarius Plateau, the east slope of the Kaiparowits Plateau, and the high desert north of Lake Powell. It was the last river of its size to be discovered in the 48 contiguous U.S. states. The average discharge is approximately 146 cfs (4.1 m^{3}/s).

The river was first mapped and named by Almon Thompson, a member of the 1872 Colorado River expedition led by John Wesley Powell. It was named after Silvestre Vélez de Escalante, a Franciscan missionary and the first known European explorer of the region. In 1776, Escalante and his Spanish superior Francisco Atanasio Domínguez left from Santa Fe, New Mexico in an attempt to reach Monterey, California. During this journey, usually referred to as the Domínguez–Escalante expedition, Escalante and his companions passed by the Grand Canyon and were the first white men to enter Utah.

Much of the Escalante River's course is through sinuous sandstone gorges. The river and the canyons which drain into it form a key section of Grand Staircase–Escalante National Monument. This region is a popular destination for hiking and backpacking.

For most of the year, the Escalante River is a small stream, easily stepped across or waded. During spring runoff and the summer monsoon, however, the river can become a raging, muddy torrent ten to one hundred times bigger. In some years, the river can be run using kayaks or canoes (rafts are too large), but this requires both good timings — water which is too high or too low can make travel impossible, stranding boaters — and the willingness to portage boats several hundred vertical feet at the end of the trip.

== Gallery ==
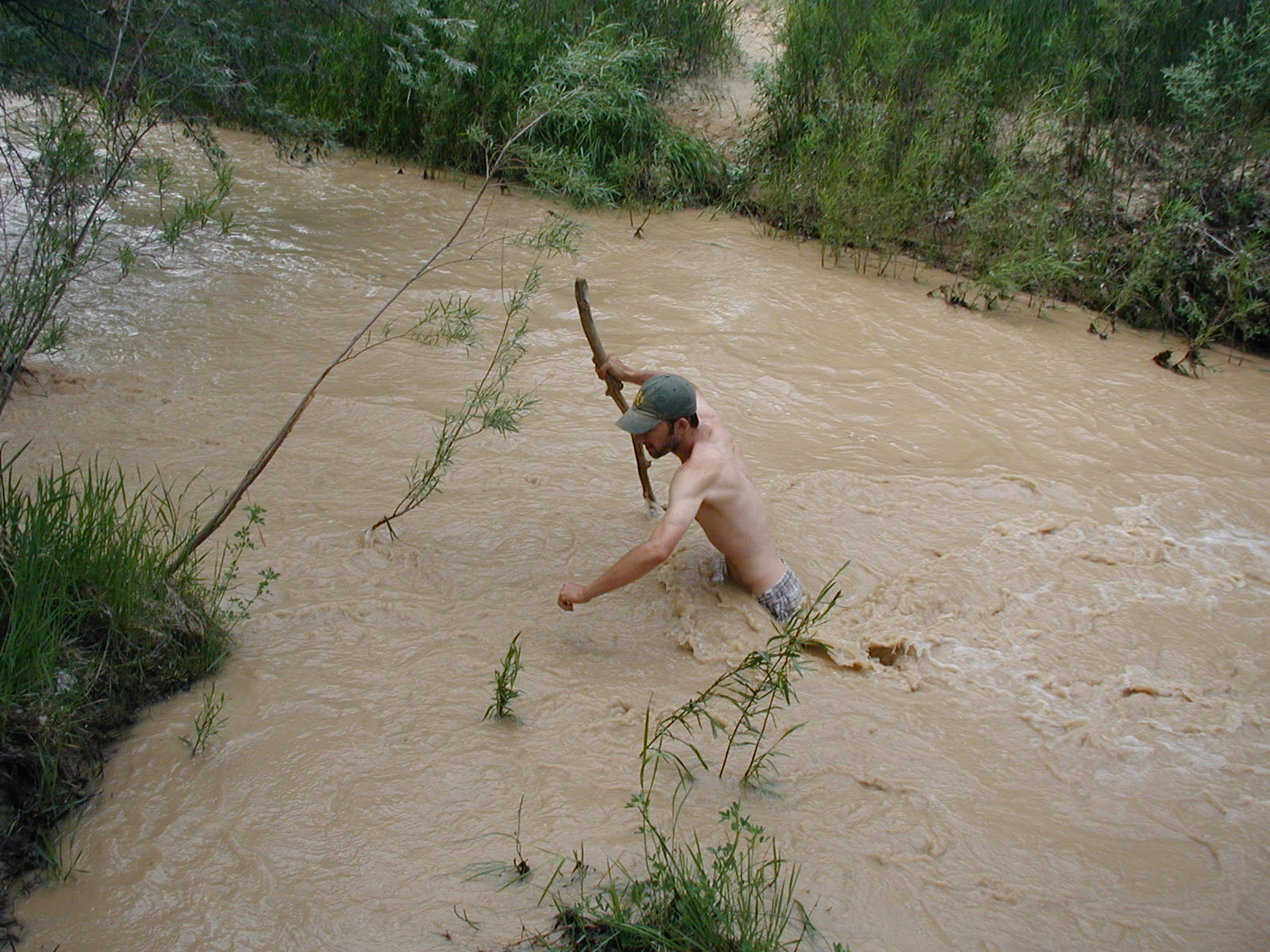
Hiker crossing the Escalante during spring floods in 2005.

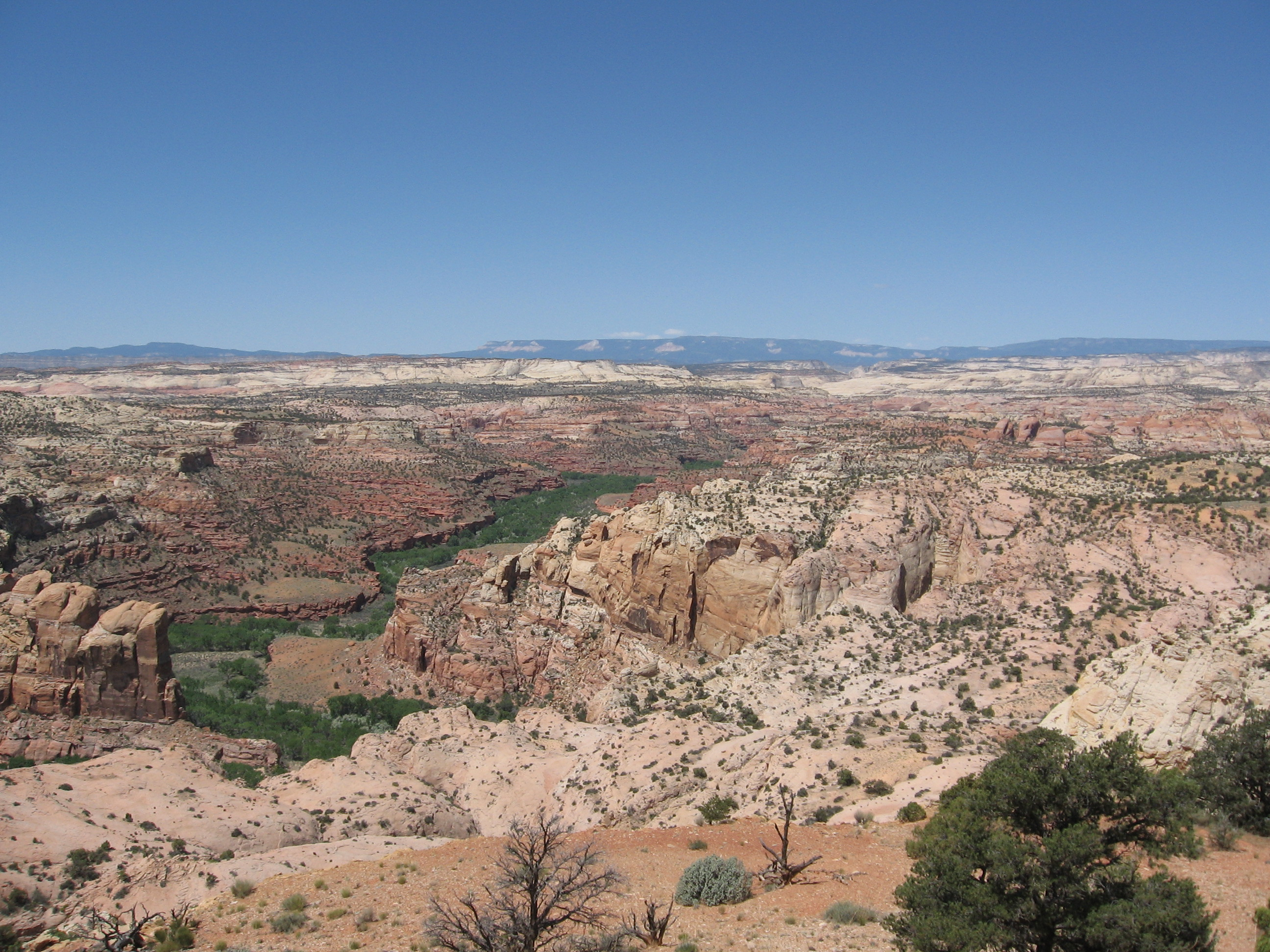
Escalante River gorge upstream from its confluence with Boulder Creek. The Aquarius Plateau is visible on the skyline.

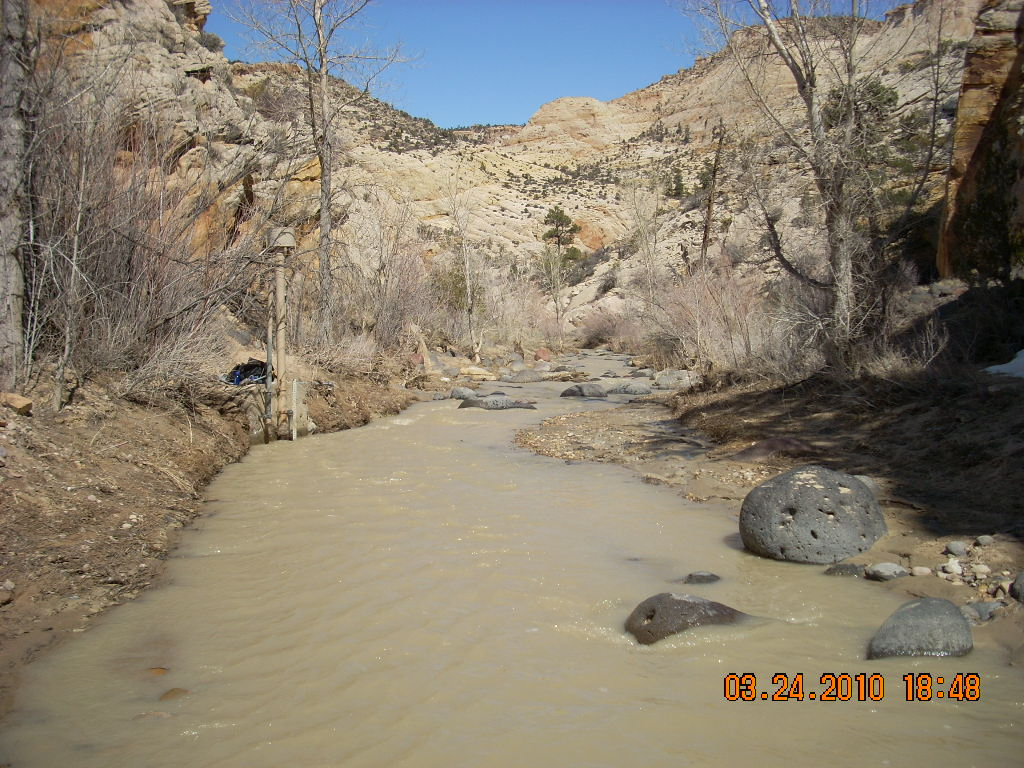
The Escalante River near Escalante, Utah

== See also ==
- Canyons of the Escalante
- Coyote Gulch
- List of Utah rivers
- List of tributaries of the Colorado River
