= Grand Staircase–Escalante National Monument =

National monument in Utah, United States

- IUCN category V (protected landscape/seascape)
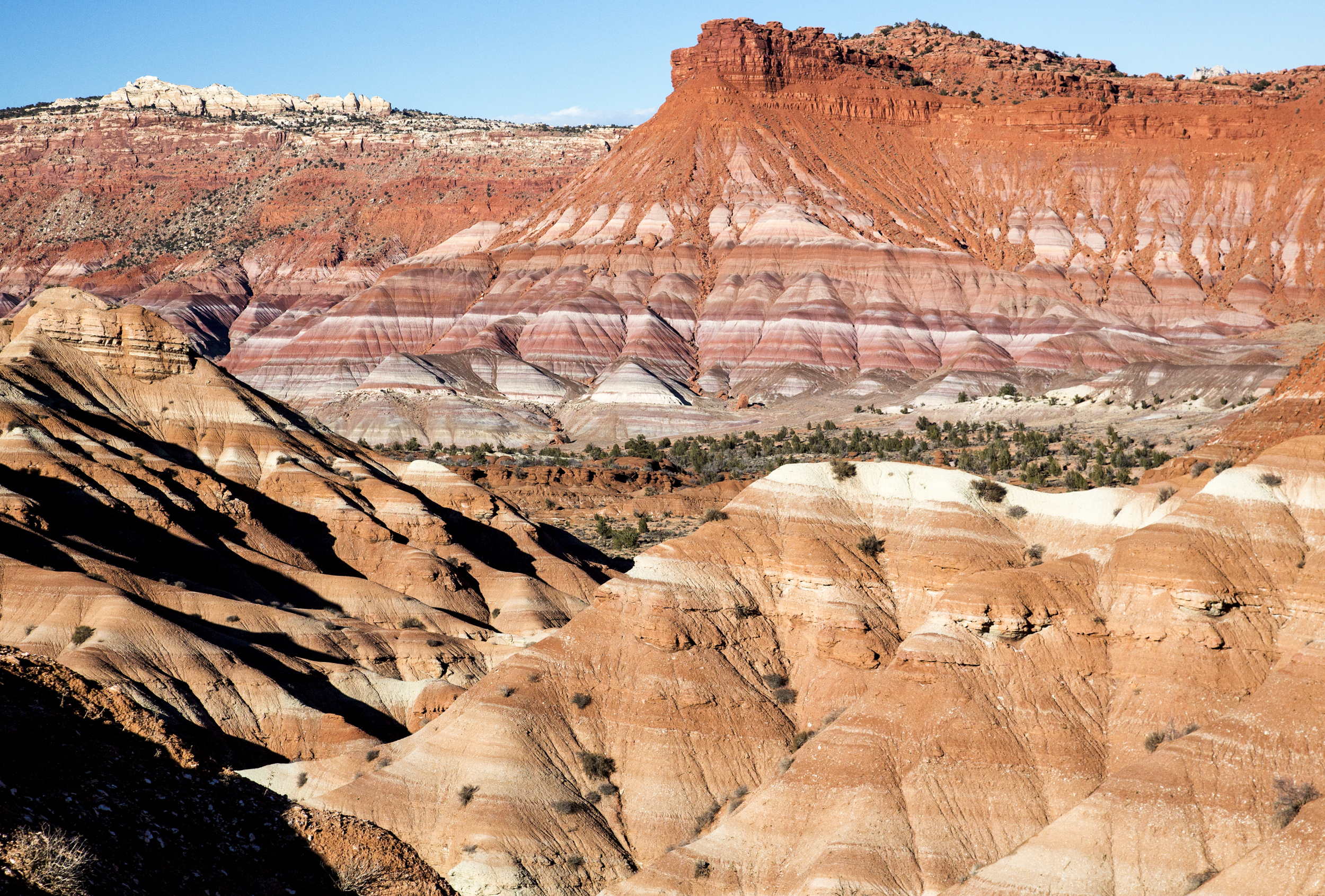
- A canyon in Grand Staircase–Escalante National Monument
- Interactive map of Grand Staircase–Escalante National Monument
- Location: Kane County and Garfield County, Utah, United States
- Nearest city: Kanab, Utah
- Coordinates: 37°24′0″N 111°41′0″W
- Area: 1,870,000 acres (7,600 km^{2})
- Established: September 18, 1996
- Visitors: 878,000 (in 2014)
- Governing body: Bureau of Land Management
- Website: Grand Staircase–Escalante National Monument

The Grand Staircase–Escalante National Monument (GSENM) is a United States national monument protecting the Grand Staircase, the Kaiparowits Plateau, and the Canyons of the Escalante (Escalante River) in southern Utah. It was established in 1996 by President Bill Clinton under the authority of the Antiquities Act with 1.7 million acres of land, later expanded to 1,880,461 acres (7,610 km^{2}). In 2017, the monument's size was reduced by half in a succeeding presidential proclamation, and it was restored in 2021. President Trump again cut out most of the monument by proclamation on July 13, 2026. The land is among the most remote in the country; it was the last to be mapped in the contiguous United States.

The monument is administered by the Bureau of Land Management (BLM) as part of the National Conservation Lands system. Grand Staircase–Escalante is the first and largest national monument managed by the BLM. Visitor centers are located in Cannonville, Big Water, Escalante, and Kanab.

== Geography ==
The monument stretches from the towns of Big Water, Glendale, and Kanab, Utah in the southwest to the towns of Escalante and Boulder in the northeast. The monument is slightly larger in area than the state of Delaware. After a reduction ordered by presidential proclamation in December 2017, the monument encompassed 1,003,863 acres (4,062 km^{2}), but it was restored to 1,870,000 acres (7,568 km^{2}) in 2021.

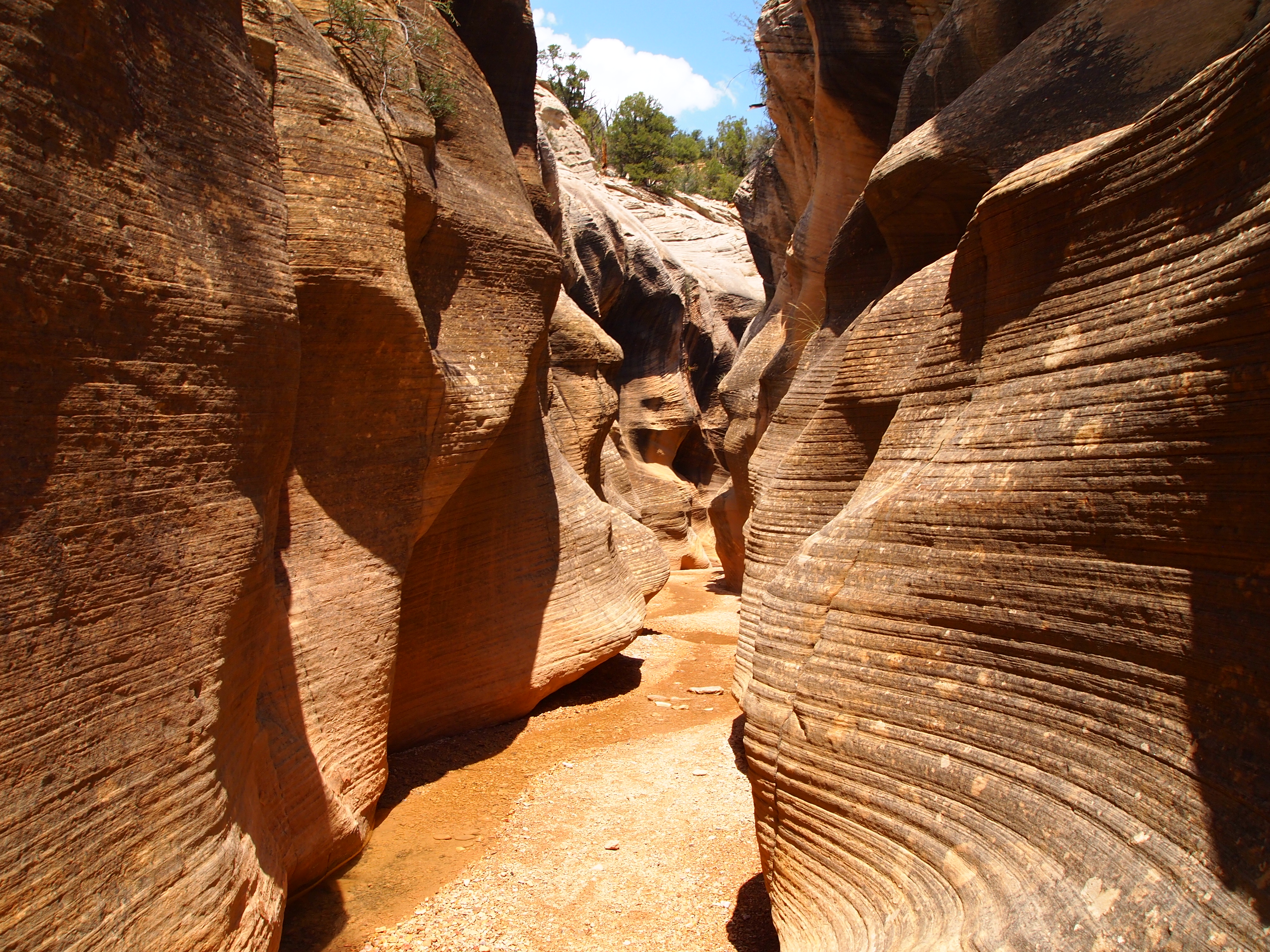
Willis Creek in the Grand Staircase

The western part of the monument is dominated by the Paunsaugunt Plateau and the Paria River, and is adjacent to Bryce Canyon National Park. This section shows the geologic progression of the Grand Staircase. Features include the slot canyons of Bull Valley Gorge, Willis Creek, and Lick Wash which are accessed from Skutumpah Road.

The center section is dominated by a single long ridge, called the Kaiparowits Plateau from the west, and Fifty-Mile Mountain when viewed from the east. Fifty-Mile Mountain stretches southeast from the town of Escalante to the Colorado River in Glen Canyon. The eastern face of the mountain is a 2,200 ft (670 m) escarpment. The western side (the Kaiparowits Plateau) is a shallow slope descending to the south and west.

East of Fifty-Mile Mountain is the Canyons of the Escalante. The monument is bounded by Glen Canyon National Recreation Area on the east and south. The popular hiking, backpacking, and canyoneering areas include Calf Creek Falls off Utah Scenic Byway 12, and Zebra Canyon, Harris Wash, and the Devils Garden. The latter areas are accessed via the Hole-in-the-Rock Road, which extends southeast from Escalante, near the base of Fifty-Mile Mountain. The Dry Fork Slots of Coyote Gulch and lower Coyote Gulch are also located off the Hole-in-the-Rock Road.

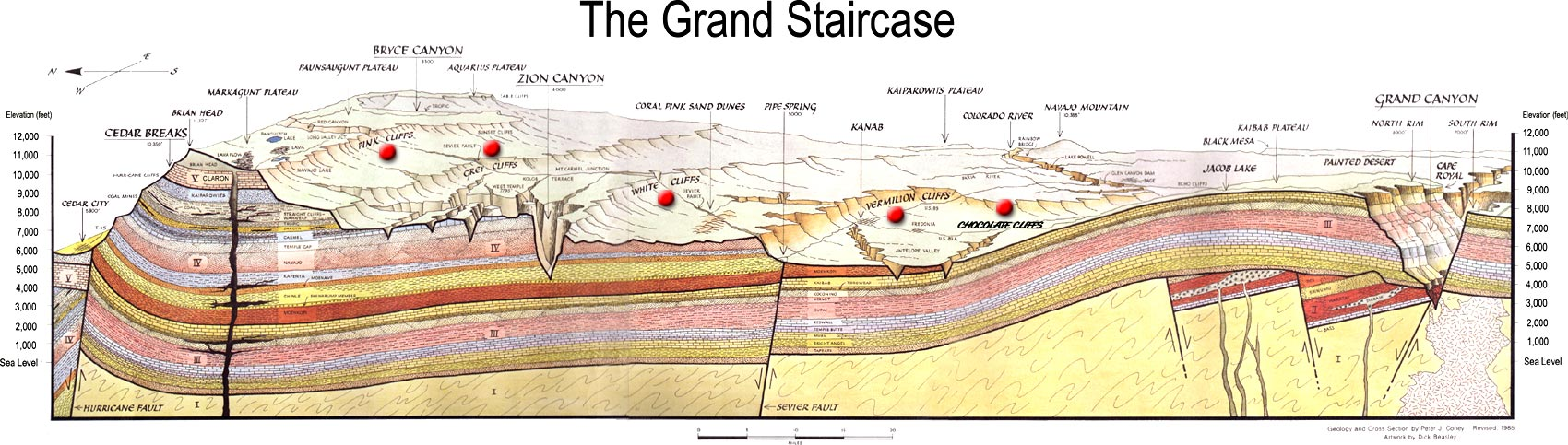
Geologic cross section of the Grand Staircase

== Paleontology ==
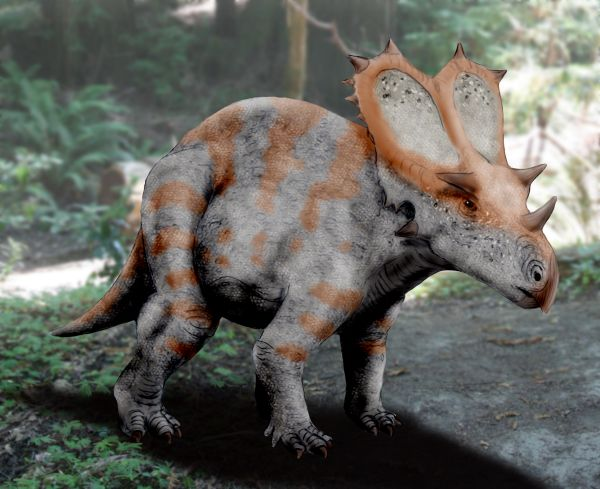
Utahceratops gettyi

Since 2000, numerous dinosaur fossils over 75 million years old have been found at Grand Staircase–Escalante.

In 2002, a volunteer at the Monument discovered a 75-million-year-old dinosaur near the Arizona border. On October 3, 2007, the dinosaur's name, Gryposaurus monumentensis (hook-beaked lizard from the monument) was announced in the Zoological Journal of the Linnean Society. G. monumentensis was at least 30 feet (9.1 m) long and 10 feet (3.0 m) tall, and has a powerful jaw with more than 800 teeth. Many of the specimens from the Kaiparowits Formation are reposited at the Natural History Museum of Utah in Salt Lake City.

Two ceratopsid (horned) dinosaurs, also discovered at the monument, were introduced by the Utah Geological Survey in 2007. They were uncovered in the Wahweap Formation, which is just below the Kaiparowits formation, where the duckbill was extracted. They lived about 80 million or 81 million years ago. The two fossils are called the Last Chance skull and the Nipple Butte skull. They were found in 2002 and 2001, respectively. Both were later identified as belonging to Diabloceratops.

In 2013 the discovery of a new species, Lythronax argestes, was announced. It is a tyrannosaur that is approximately 13 million years older than Tyrannosaurus, named for its great resemblance to its descendant. The specimen can be seen at the Natural History Museum of Utah.

== Human history ==
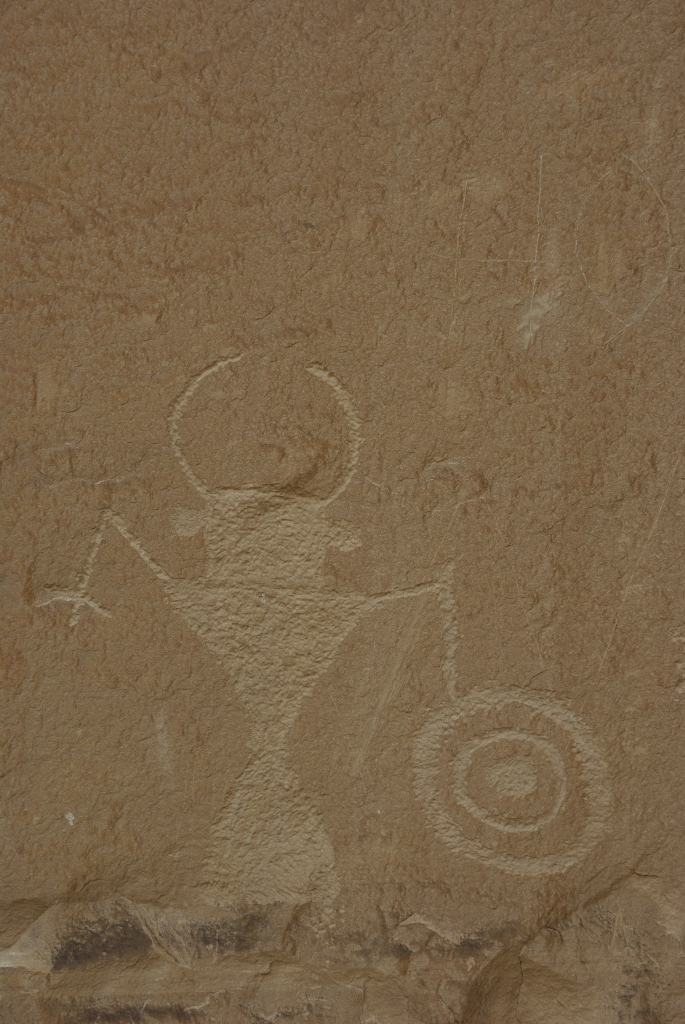
Anthropomorphic petroglyph along the Escalante River

Humans did not settle permanently in the area until the Basketmaker III Era, around AD 500. Both the Fremont and ancestral Puebloan people lived here; the Fremont hunted and gathered below the plateau and near the Escalante Valley, and the ancestral Puebloans farmed in the canyons. Both groups grew corn, beans, and squash, built brush-roofed pithouses, and took advantage of natural rock shelters. Ruins and rock art can be found throughout the Monument.

The first record of white settlers in the region dates from 1866 when Captain James Andrus led a group of cavalry to the headwaters of the Escalante River.

In 1871 Jacob Hamblin of Kanab, on his way to resupply the second John Wesley Powell expedition, mistook the Escalante River for the Dirty Devil River and became the first Anglo to travel the length of the canyon.

In 1879 the San Juan Expedition crossed through the region on their way to a proposed Mormon colony in the far southeastern corner of Utah. Traveling on a largely unexplored route, the group eventually arrived at the 1,200-foot (370 m) sandstone cliffs that surrounded Glen Canyon. They found the only breach for many miles in the otherwise vertical cliffs, which they named Hole-in-the-Rock. The narrow, steep, and rocky crevice eventually led to a steep sandy slope in the lower section and eventually down to the Colorado River. With winter settling in, the company decided to go down the crevice rather than retreat. After six weeks of labor, including excavation and using explosives to shift rock, they rigged a pulley system to lower their wagons and animals down the resulting road and off the cliff. There they built a ferry, crossed the river, and climbed back out through Cottonwood Canyon on the other side.

== National monument ==
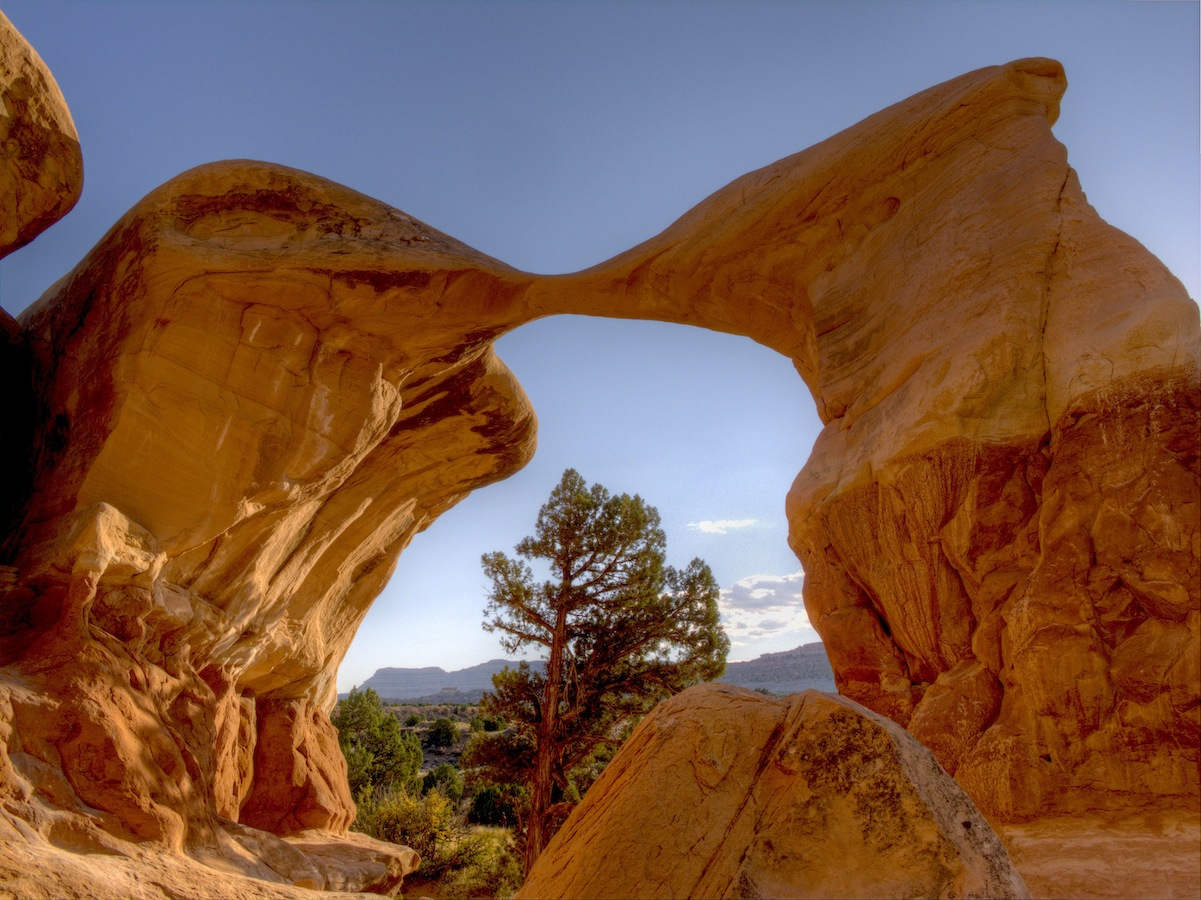
Metate Arch in Devils Garden

A national monument was initially proposed in 1934, but the project floundered until several decades later. It was on September 18, 1996, at the height of the 1996 presidential election campaign by President Bill Clinton, that the national monument was declared and was controversial from the moment of creation. The declaration ceremony was held at Grand Canyon National Park in Arizona, rather than in Utah.

Local officials such as Democratic U.S. Representative Bill Orton from Utah objected to the designation of the national monument, questioning whether the Antiquities Act allowed such vast amounts of land to be designated. However, United States Supreme Court decisions have long established the president's discretion to protect land under the Antiquities Act, and several lawsuits filed in an effort to overturn the designation were dismissed by federal courts. The area's designation as a monument also nixed the Andalex Coal Mine that was proposed for a remote location on the Kaiparowits Plateau. Wilderness designation for the lands in the monument had long been sought by environmental groups; however, the designation of a monument is not the same as wilderness designation, as activities such as motorized vehicle and mountain bike use are allowed in National Monuments.

There are contentious issues peculiar to the state of Utah. Certain plots of land were assigned when Utah became a state (in 1896) as School and Institutional Trust Lands (SITLa, a Utah state agency), to be managed to produce funds for the state school system. These lands included scattered plots in the monument that could no longer be developed. The SITLa plots within the monument were exchanged for federal lands elsewhere in Utah, plus equivalent mineral rights and $50 million cash by an act of Congress, the Utah Schools and Lands Exchange Act of 1998, supported by Democrats and Republicans, and signed into law as Public Law 105–335 on October 31, 1998.

A more difficult problem is the resolution of United States Revised statute 2477 (R.S. 2477) road claims. R.S. 2477 (Section 8 of the 1866 Mining Act) states: "The right-of-way for the construction of highways over public lands, not reserved for public uses, is hereby granted." The statute was repealed by the Federal Land Policy and Management Act (FLPMA) of 1976, but the repeal was subject to valid existing rights.

A process for resolving disputed claims has not been established, and in 1996, the 104th United States Congress passed a law that prohibited the R.S. 2477 (proposed resolution regulations) written by the Clinton Administration from taking effect without congressional approval.

The right to maintain and improve the many unpaved roads in the national monument is disputed, with county officials placing county road signs on the roads they claim and occasionally applying bulldozers to grade claimed roads, while the Bureau of Land Management tries to exert control over the same roads. Litigation between the state and federal government over R.S. 2477 and road maintenance in the national monument is an ongoing issue.

=== Reductions in size, restoration, and lawsuits ===
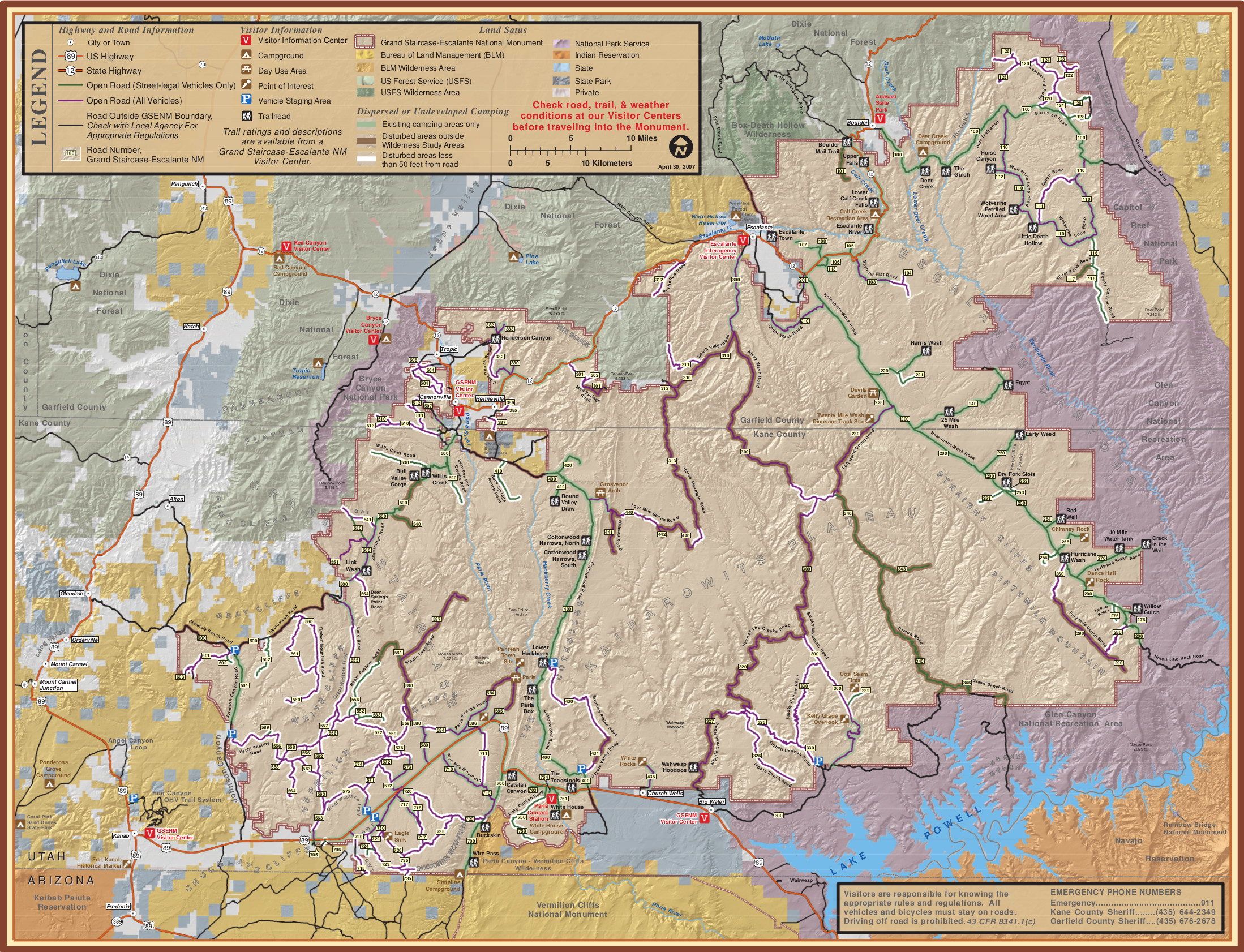
Map showing original 1996 monument boundaries

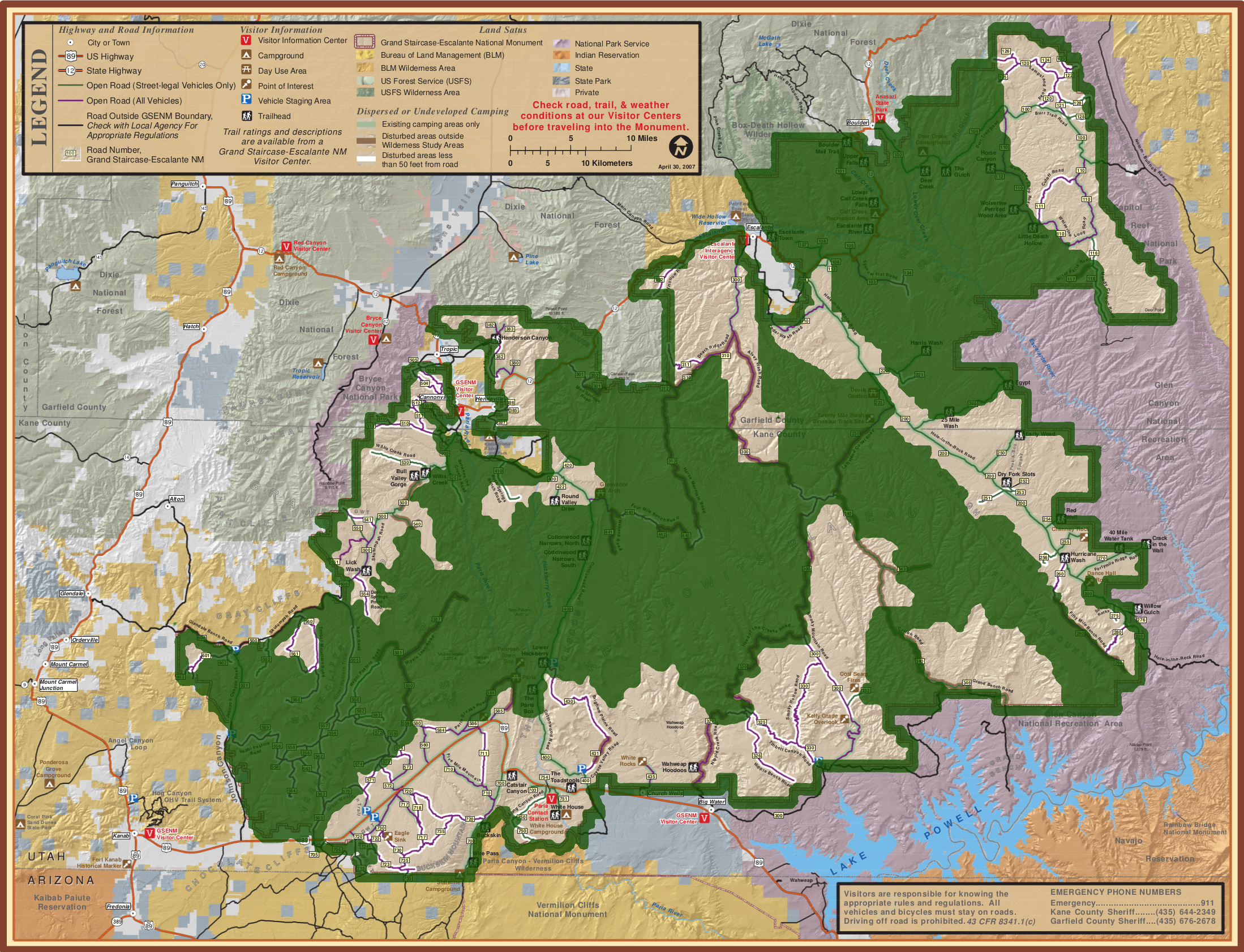
Original boundaries outlined; revised boundaries shaded (2017–2021)

On December 4, 2017, President Donald Trump ordered that the monument's size be reduced by nearly 47% to 1,003,863 acres (4,062 km^{2}), with the remainder divided into three areas, two of which border one another along the Paria River. The three separate units were: Grand Staircase, occupying the northwestern portion of the monument; Kaiparowits, centered on the Kaiparowits Plateau in the monument's central and southern regions; and Canyons of the Escalante, encompassing the Escalante River watershed and associated canyon country in the eastern portion of the monument. Bears Ears National Monument was significantly reduced in size at the same time. Conservation, angling, hunting, and outdoor recreation groups filed suit to block any reduction in the national monument, arguing that the president has no legal authority to materially shrink a national monument. The cases were still pending at the 2020 election. The Trump administration subsequently approved logging within the national monument and coal mining in the area that was removed from the monument.

On his first day in office, President Joe Biden signed an executive order calling for a review of the reduction of the Bears Ears and Grand Staircase–Escalante monuments. On October 8, 2021, he restored the original boundaries.

Two lawsuits, Garfield County v. Biden, filed by the state of Utah and two Utah counties, and Dalton v. Biden, filed by a mining company and recreationalists, seek to overturn the reaffirmed original boundaries and attack the Antiquities Act. The tribes filed motions to intervene.

On August 11, 2023, U.S. district judge David Nuffer dismissed both cases, explaining that "the Antiquities Act gives the president broad authority to designate national monuments and that courts cannot second-guess that authority." The state of Utah and other parties have since appealed the dismissal, but no such challenge has been successful in 100 years of the Antiquity Act's history. The United States Court of Appeals for the Tenth Circuit heard the case in September 2024.

On July 13, 2026, president Donald Trump issued a proclamation modifying the boundaries of Grand Staircase–Escalante National Monument, reducing the monument from 1.87 million acres to 181,541 acres. It eliminated the Grand Staircase Unit, reduced the former Kaiparowits Unit to an approximately 8,900-acre area named the Kaiparowits Horizons Unit, and retained parts of the Canyons of the Escalante Unit. The proclamation superseded the boundaries restored by President Joe Biden in 2021. Leadership of the Utah Republican Party, including Utah governor Spencer Cox and Utah senator Mike Lee, had lobbied to reopen the land for mining.

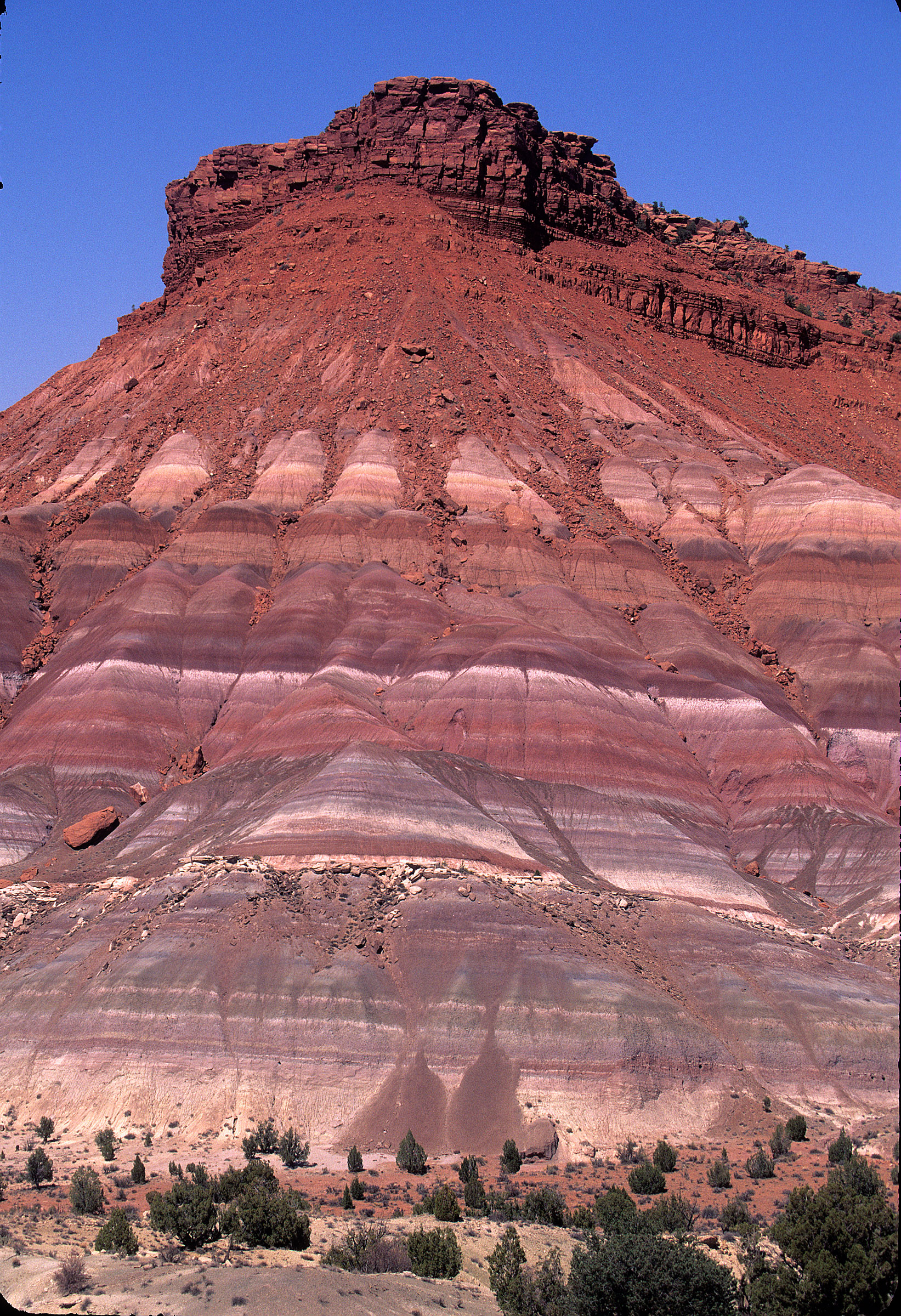
Grand Starcase Escalante, 2002

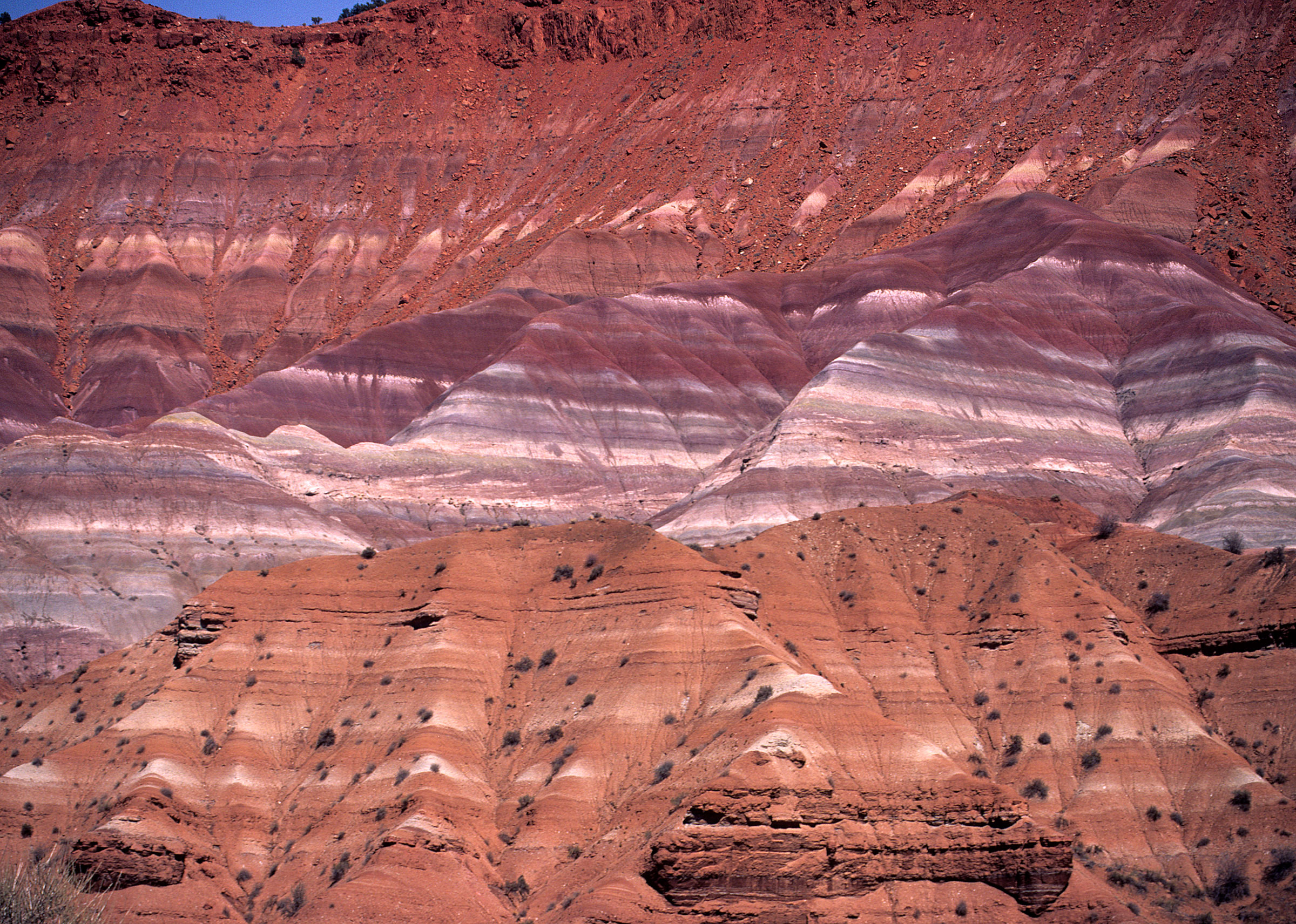
2002

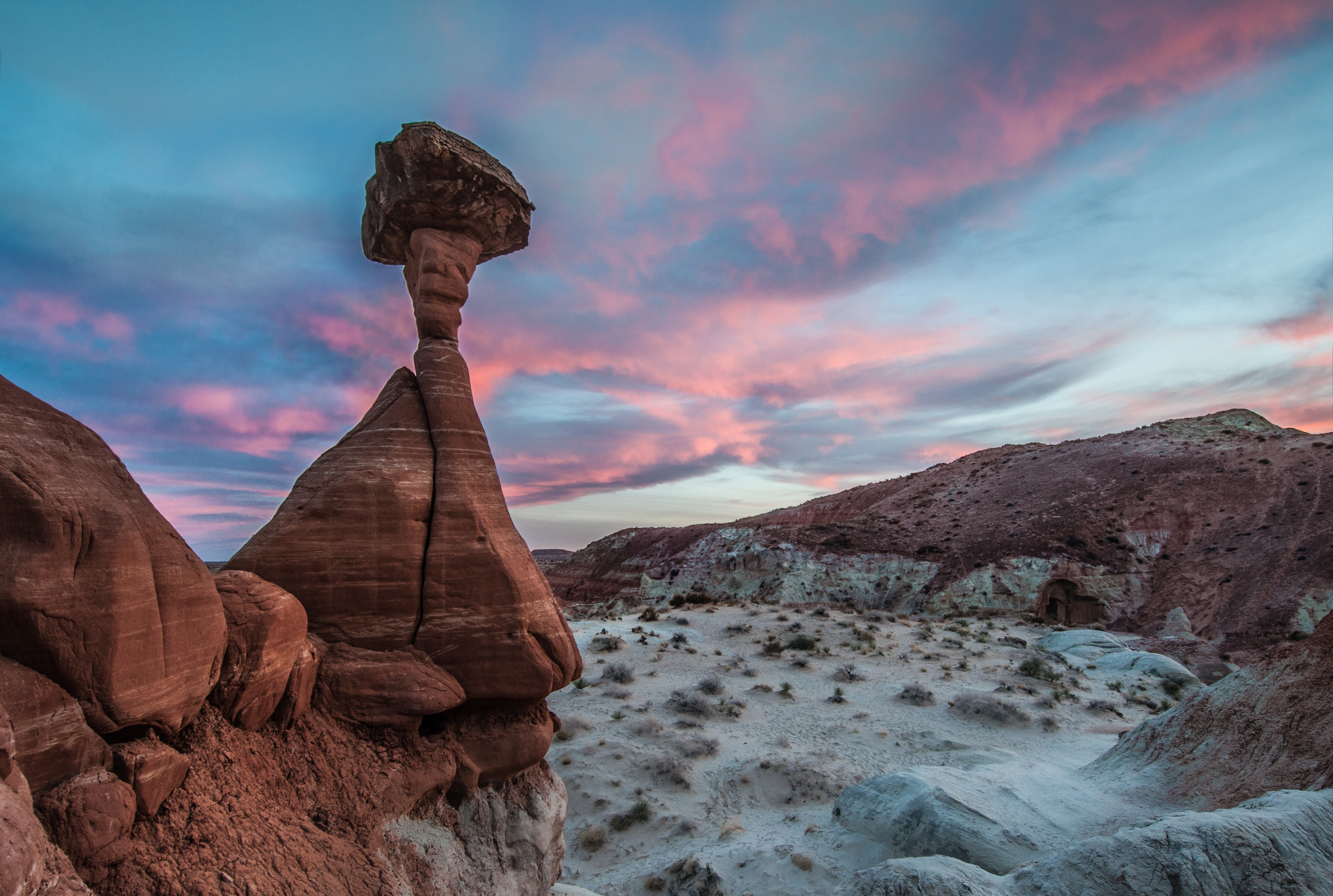
Rock formation, 2010

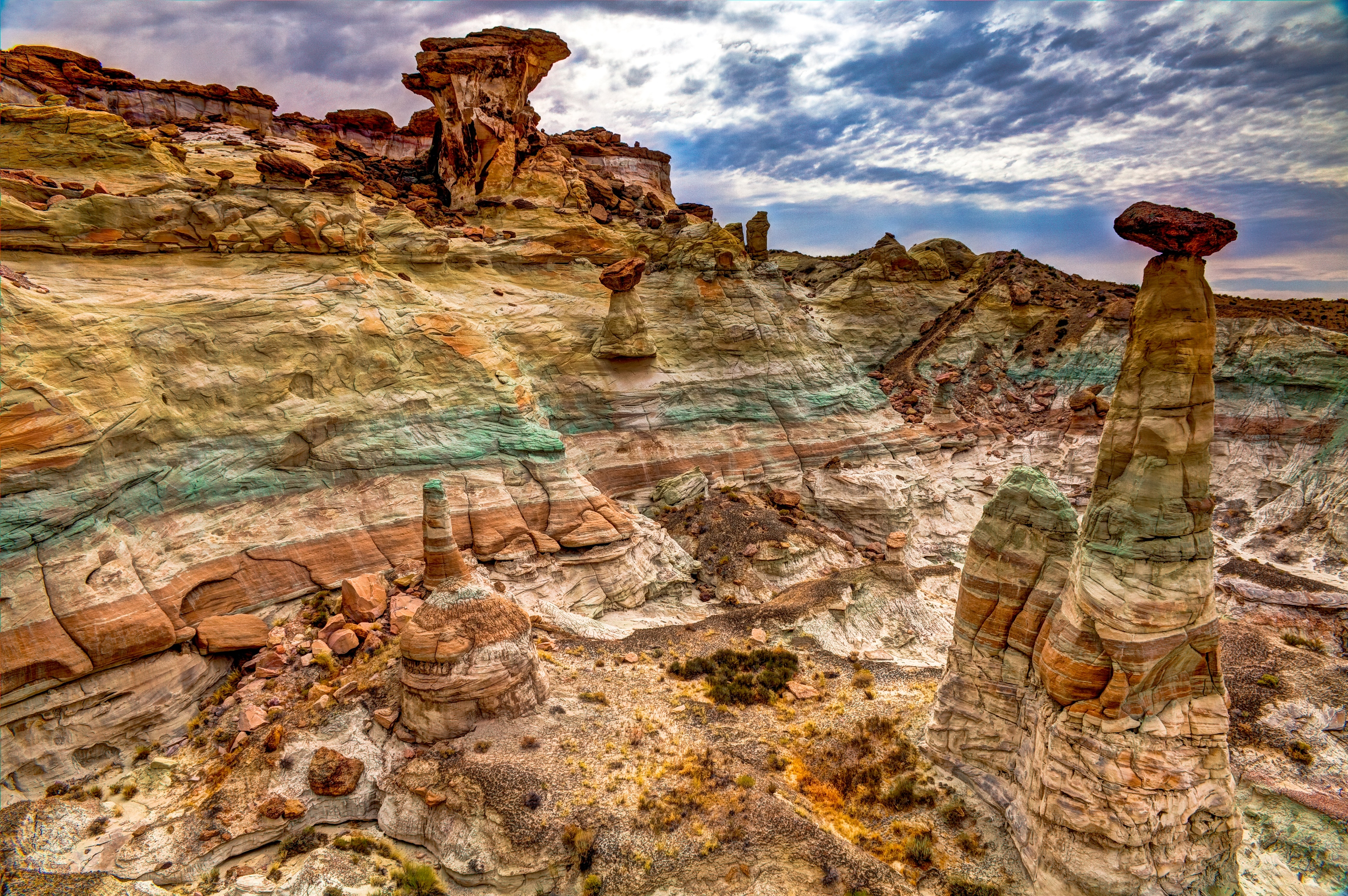
Colorful shot of Staircase, 2014

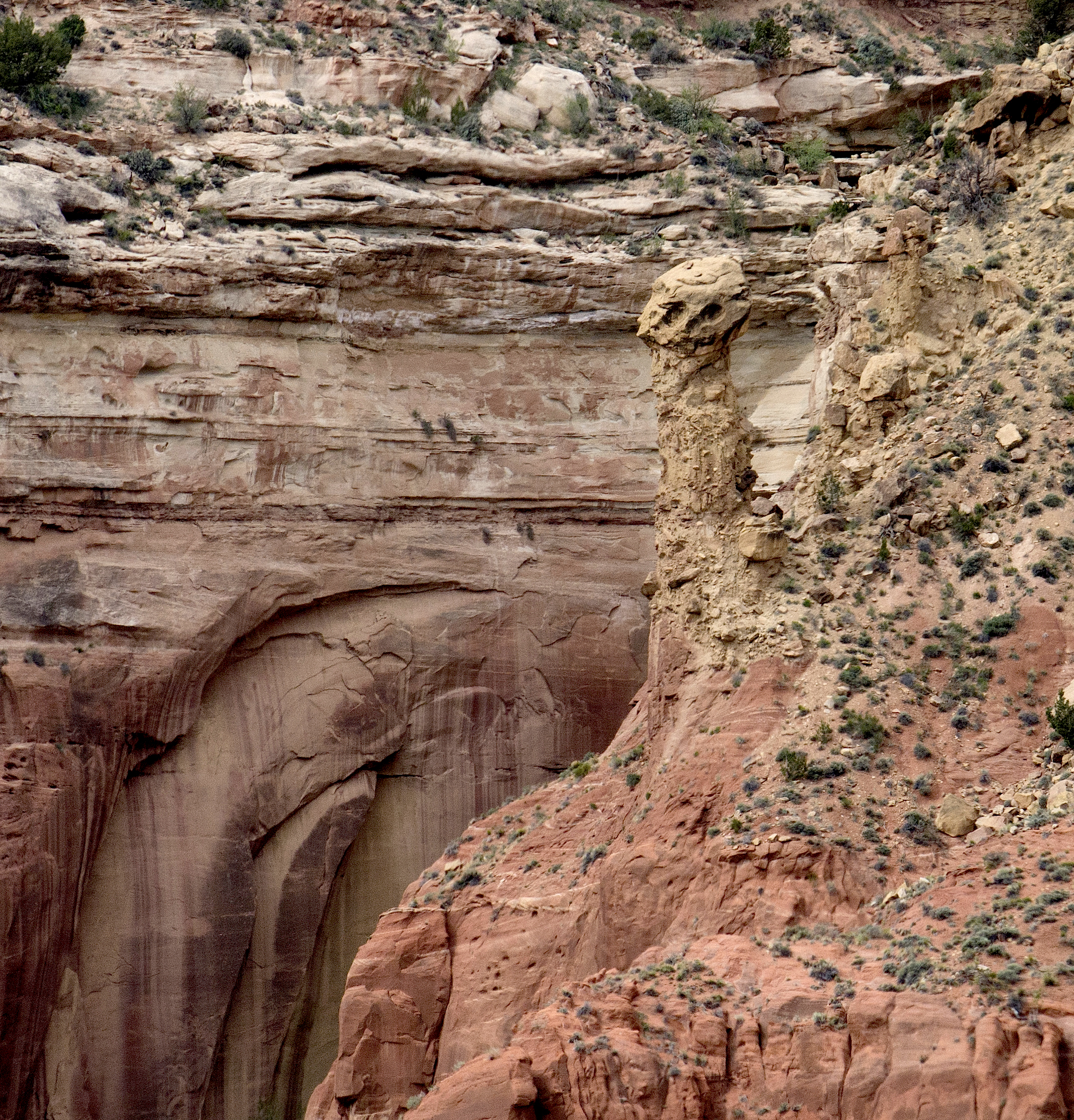
Large hoodoo off Fifty Mile Bench Road, 2014

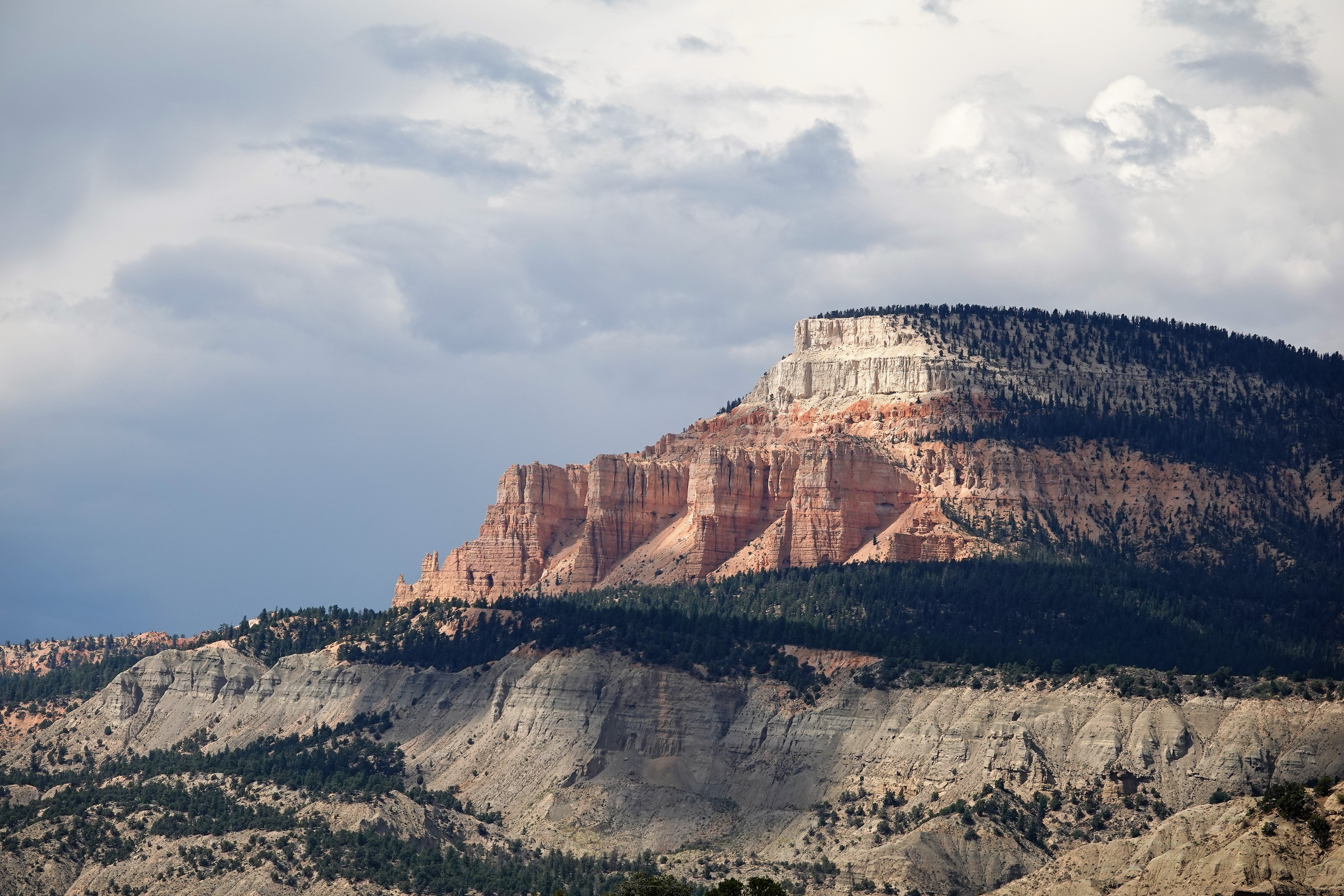
Grand Staircase, 2018

== See also ==
- List of national monuments of the United States
- Cottonwood Canyon Road
- Dixie National Forest
- Escalante Petrified Forest State Park
- Grosvenor Arch
- Kodachrome Basin State Park
- Paria Canyon-Vermilion Cliffs Wilderness
- Silvestre Vélez de Escalante
