= Willis Creek (Garfield and Kane counties, Utah) =

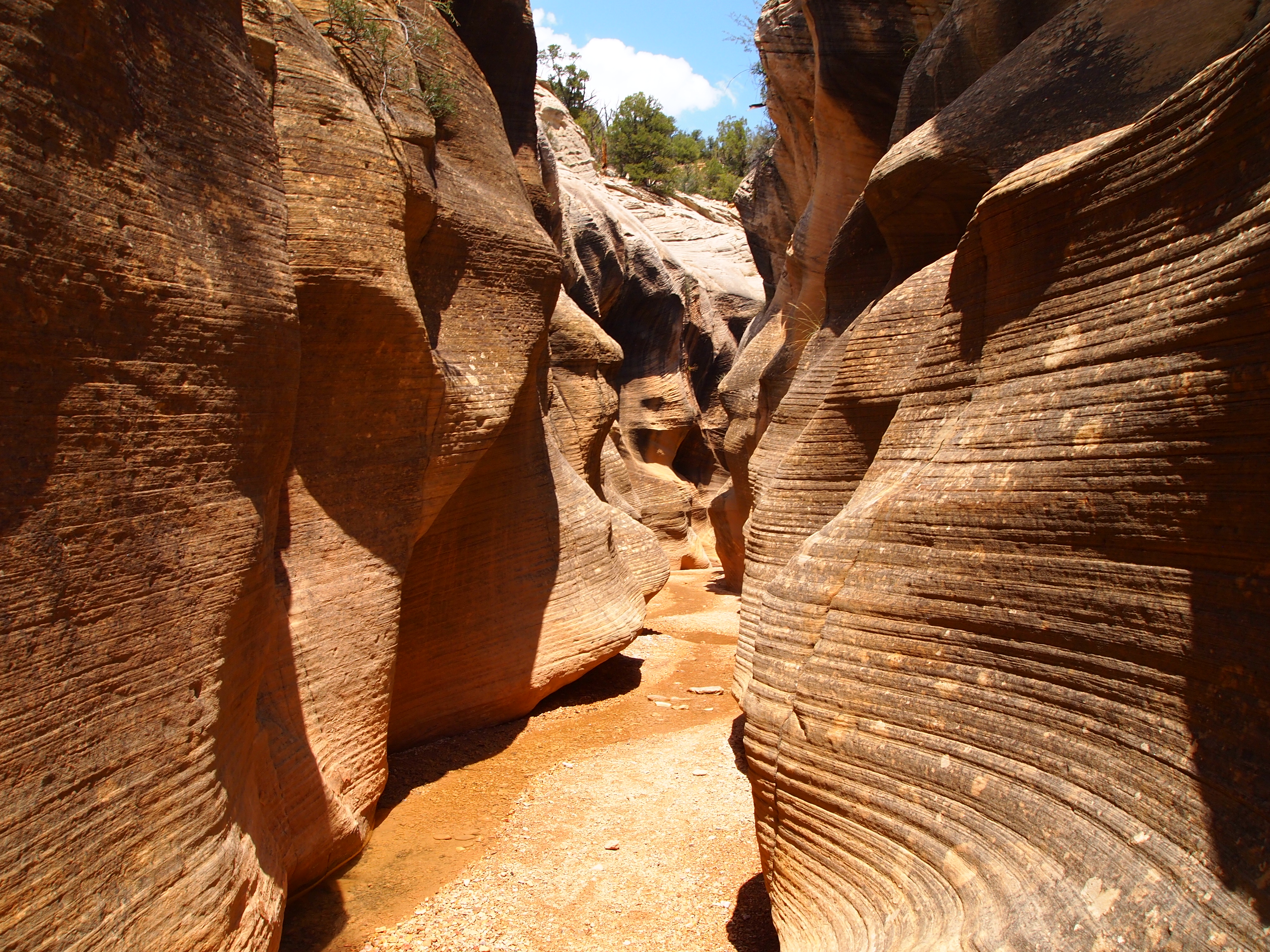
- A narrow section of Willis Creek, July 2013

- Location of mouth
- Etymology: William Patterson Willis

Location
- Country: United States
- State: Utah
- Region: Garfield and Kane counties

Physical characteristics
- Source
  - coordinates: 37.5538719°N 112.2321409°W
- Mouth
  - coordinates: 37.481159°N 112.09605°W

Willis Creek is a creek in Bryce Canyon National Park, Dixie National Forest, and the Grand Staircase–Escalante National Monument in Garfield and Kane counties in southern Utah, United States. The creek rises in the national park in Garfield County, but quickly heads south out of the park to enter the national forest and Kane County. The course of the creek then curves to the east and enters the national monument, where it eventually runs through a wash, which in some sections narrows to become a slot canyon. This slot canyon is officially known as the Willis Creek Slot Canyon and it is a 5.8 mile hike that is accessible at the Willis Creek Slot Canyon Trailhead. This creek is popular with hikers as the stream is generally 1-2 inches deep and a trail runs the length of the creek. The end of the creek is dry.

Willis Creek was named for William Patterson Willis, an early settler in the area.

== See also ==
- List of rivers of Utah
