= Kodachrome Basin State Park =

State park in Utah, United States

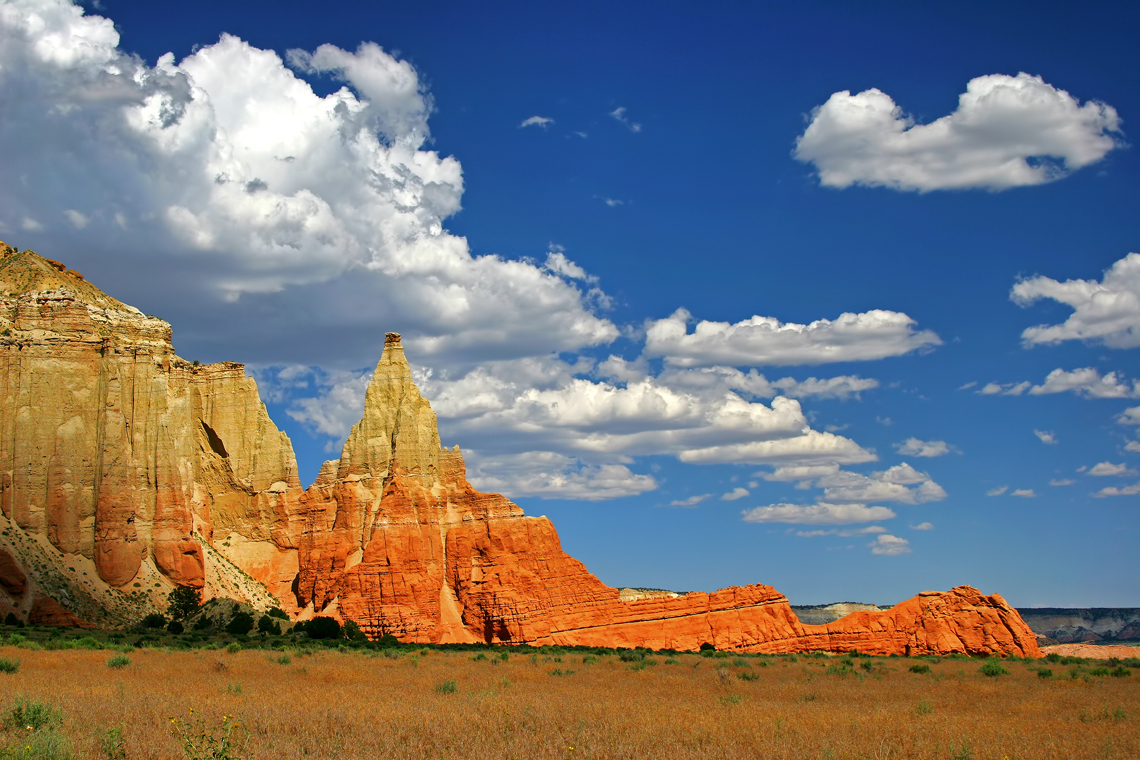

- Location within Utah Location within the United States
- Interactive map of Kodachrome Basin State Park
- Location: Kane County, Utah, United States
- Coordinates: 37°30′2″N 112°0′2″W
- Area: 2,240 acres (910 ha)
- Elevation: 5,800 ft (1,800 m)
- Opened: 1963
- Operator: Utah State Parks
- Visitors: 179,164 (in 2025)
- Website: Official website
- Utah State Parks

Kodachrome Basin is a state park of Utah, United States. It is situated 5,800 feet (1,767.8 m) above sea level, 12 miles (19 km) south of Utah Route 12, and 20 miles (32 km) southeast of Bryce Canyon National Park. It is accessible from the north from Cannonville by a paved road and from the south by Road 400, a dirt road from the Page, Arizona area to Cannonville, passable for most vehicles in dry conditions. A longer but paved route to Tropic from the south is also available via US-89 and SR-12.

== Geology ==
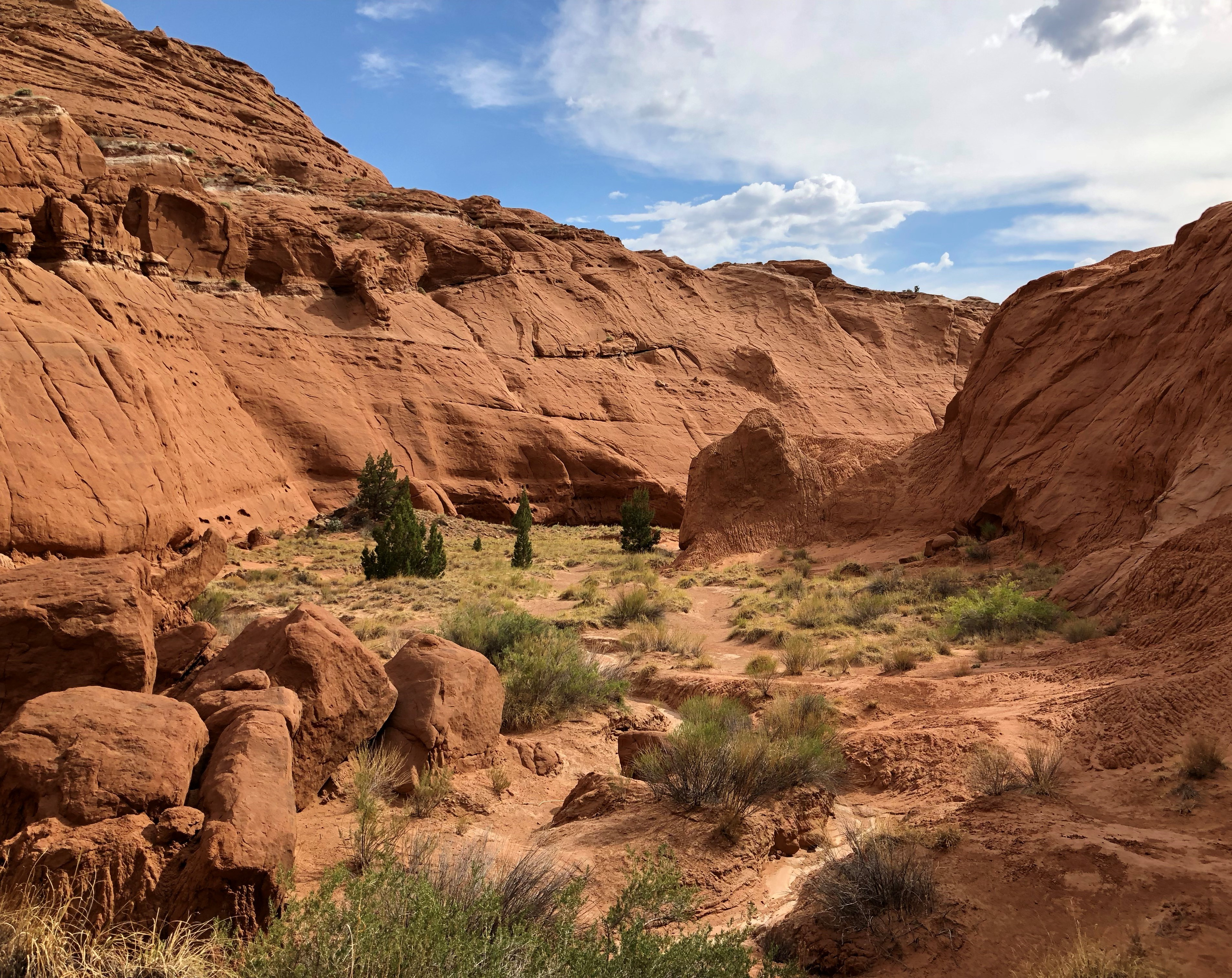
Box Canyon at Kodachrome

The geologic interests of the park are sandstone spires and columns called sand pipes or clastic dikes, which are rarely found elsewhere. Differing geological explanations of the features in Kodachrome Basin State Park exist. One explanation is that the area was once similar to Yellowstone National Park with hot springs and geysers, which eventually filled up with sediment and solidified. Through time, the Entrada sandstone surrounding the solidified geysers eroded, leaving large sand pipes. Sixty-seven sand pipes ranging from 2 to 52 metres (7 to 171 ft) in length have been identified in the park.

While others suggest these sandstone spires are the result of sandstone intrusions which were created as a result of the tectonic activity in the Plio-Pleistocene time, the time of the uplift of the surrounding plateaus. Indications for this model include the concentric vertical ring structure of the columns themselves where each of the three vertical rings of sandstone, central, inner, and outer, can be traced and matched to a distinct sedimentary formation below. Also the truncation of two of the structures, at Shepherd's Point, by Pleistocene sheet conglomerates, and other intrusions which pierce through Pleistocene river deposited conglomerates place the intrusion event in the Pleistocene. The river conglomerates are truncated by the sheet conglomerates. Sheet conglomerates are usually caused by major seismic activity. There are also quite large well-rounded clasts, ranging in size from 2.5 centimetres (1 in) and greater, found along the outer layer of the sandstone spires which are from the Pleistocene river conglomerates. Smaller less rounded, more angular clasts, about one centimetre (0.39 in) or less in width, are also found and are from the red claystones layers found in the intruded sandstones. These clearly indicate that the pierced formations were well lithified. Additionally, the area has large masses of sandstone dikes. The spires have no evidence of a chaotic, mixing flow regime, rather they indicate a laminar flow not suggestive of hot springs or geysers. The outer surface is highly lithified, but within a few millimeters, the sandstone is quite friable.

The primary argument against an intrusion event is the liquified state required for the seismic intrusions. The source sediments are Jurassic in age, therefore, it is argued, could not have been liquified. Furthermore, the hardened red claystone layers were fairly consolidated at time of the intrusion event, therefore required tremendous pressure in order to be pierced. But there are intrusive dikes which show liquification did occur, and the claystone was pieced, which could have been done by seismic pressure waves. The fracturing of the claystones also suggests that the intrusive sandstones were point sources able to concentrate the fluid pressure to a small area of the overlaying rock. It is also noted that the intrusions cleanly sheared the claystones so that the concentric edge of the claystone abuts cleanly against the spires.

== History ==
Evidence near the park suggests that Native Americans were the first to wander through the area. Around the turn of the 20th century, cattlemen from Cannonville and Henrieville used the basin as a winter pasture.

In 1948 the National Geographic Society explored and photographed the area for a story that appeared in the September 1949 issue of National Geographic. They named the area Kodachrome Flat, after the brand of Kodak film known for its vibrant color rendition. In 1962 the area was designated a state park. Fearing repercussions from the Kodak film company for using the name Kodachrome, the name was changed to Chimney Rock State Park, but renamed Kodachrome Basin a few years later with Kodak's permission.

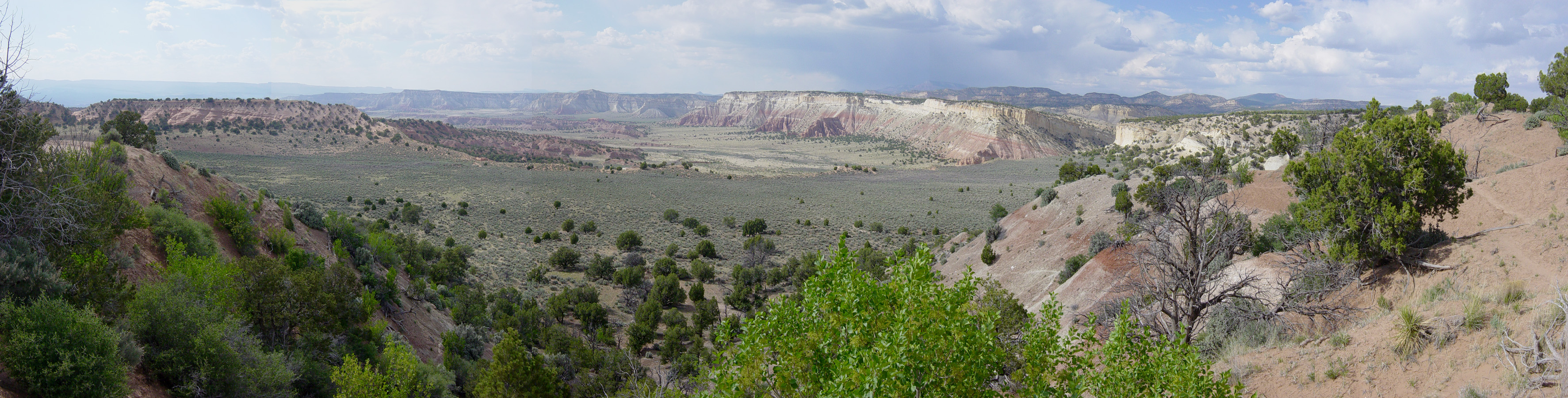
Panoramic view from Road 400

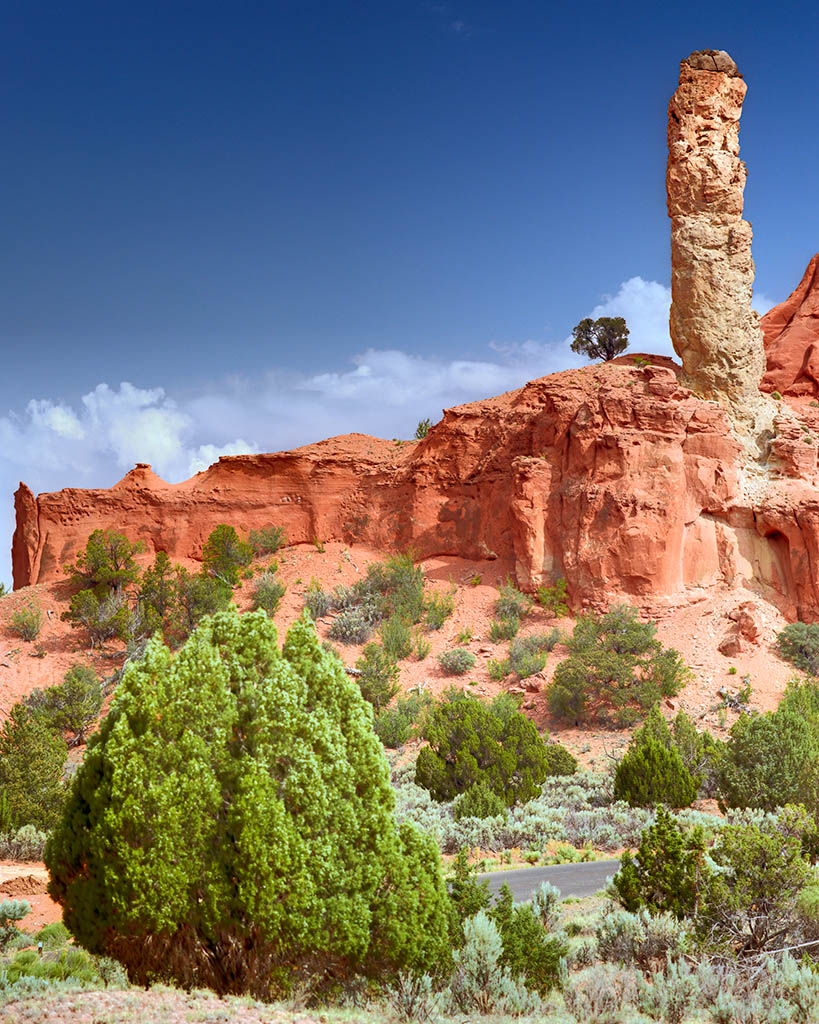
Sand pipe, Kodachrome Basin State Park

== Recreational activities ==
Primary recreational activities in Kodachrome Basin State Park include photography, wildlife watching, camping, and hiking the park's several trails. Popular sites include Chimney Rock, Shakespeare Arch (which collapsed in 2019), and Ballerina Spire. Stargazing is popular as the park sees little light pollution. Grosvenor Arch, an intricate double arch located ten miles south east of the park in the Grand Staircase–Escalante National Monument is a popular destination for many visitors. Kodachrome Basin State Park has 55 campsites, two of which are group sites as well as available showers. Campsites can be reserved at Reserve America. There are also two bunkhouse cabins inside the state park for lodging, managed by the park. Horseback rides are also available throughout the park and surrounding wilderness areas.

== Climate ==
Kodachrome Basin State Park has a cold semi-arid climate (Köppen: BSk) with cold winters, warm to hot summers, and large diurnal temperature variation throughout the year.

Climate data for Kodachrome Basin State Park, Utah, 1991–2020 normals, extremes 1979–present
| Month | Jan | Feb | Mar | Apr | May | Jun | Jul | Aug | Sep | Oct | Nov | Dec | Year |
|---|---|---|---|---|---|---|---|---|---|---|---|---|---|
| Record high °F (°C) | 68 (20) | 75 (24) | 81 (27) | 88 (31) | 97 (36) | 103 (39) | 104 (40) | 101 (38) | 101 (38) | 90 (32) | 77 (25) | 67 (19) | 104 (40) |
| Mean maximum °F (°C) | 56.6 (13.7) | 60.9 (16.1) | 71.4 (21.9) | 79.3 (26.3) | 87.1 (30.6) | 95.5 (35.3) | 98.7 (37.1) | 95.9 (35.5) | 91.0 (32.8) | 81.2 (27.3) | 69.2 (20.7) | 57.8 (14.3) | 99.3 (37.4) |
| Mean daily maximum °F (°C) | 44.9 (7.2) | 48.9 (9.4) | 57.6 (14.2) | 65.0 (18.3) | 74.3 (23.5) | 85.6 (29.8) | 90.6 (32.6) | 87.8 (31.0) | 80.7 (27.1) | 68.4 (20.2) | 54.8 (12.7) | 44.4 (6.9) | 66.9 (19.4) |
| Daily mean °F (°C) | 30.2 (−1.0) | 34.1 (1.2) | 40.9 (4.9) | 47.1 (8.4) | 55.3 (12.9) | 64.4 (18.0) | 71.4 (21.9) | 69.2 (20.7) | 61.4 (16.3) | 49.9 (9.9) | 37.9 (3.3) | 29.5 (−1.4) | 49.3 (9.6) |
| Mean daily minimum °F (°C) | 15.5 (−9.2) | 19.3 (−7.1) | 24.2 (−4.3) | 29.2 (−1.6) | 36.2 (2.3) | 43.2 (6.2) | 52.1 (11.2) | 50.7 (10.4) | 42.1 (5.6) | 31.4 (−0.3) | 20.9 (−6.2) | 14.6 (−9.7) | 31.6 (−0.2) |
| Mean minimum °F (°C) | −1.0 (−18.3) | 6.4 (−14.2) | 13.4 (−10.3) | 18.5 (−7.5) | 25.8 (−3.4) | 33.6 (0.9) | 42.9 (6.1) | 42.9 (6.1) | 31.5 (−0.3) | 19.4 (−7.0) | 8.3 (−13.2) | −0.3 (−17.9) | −4.2 (−20.1) |
| Record low °F (°C) | −16 (−27) | −25 (−32) | −1 (−18) | 5 (−15) | 15 (−9) | 25 (−4) | 34 (1) | 31 (−1) | 24 (−4) | −7 (−22) | −4 (−20) | −22 (−30) | −25 (−32) |
| Average precipitation inches (mm) | 1.14 (29) | 1.22 (31) | 0.87 (22) | 0.62 (16) | 0.68 (17) | 0.29 (7.4) | 1.06 (27) | 1.69 (43) | 1.22 (31) | 1.32 (34) | 0.59 (15) | 0.90 (23) | 11.60 (295) |
| Average snowfall inches (cm) | 5.9 (15) | 5.2 (13) | 2.3 (5.8) | 1.5 (3.8) | 0.2 (0.51) | 0.0 (0.0) | 0.0 (0.0) | 0.0 (0.0) | 0.0 (0.0) | 0.2 (0.51) | 1.5 (3.8) | 6.9 (18) | 23.7 (60) |
| Average precipitation days (≥ 0.01 in) | 5.0 | 5.6 | 5.0 | 4.4 | 5.0 | 2.2 | 6.4 | 8.1 | 5.5 | 4.3 | 2.9 | 4.5 | 58.9 |
| Average snowy days (≥ 0.1 in) | 2.4 | 2.3 | 1.4 | 0.7 | 0.1 | 0.0 | 0.0 | 0.0 | 0.0 | 0.1 | 0.7 | 2.6 | 10.3 |
Source: NOAA
