= Grosvenor Arch =

Sandstone double arch in Kane County, Utah, United States

- Rock arch
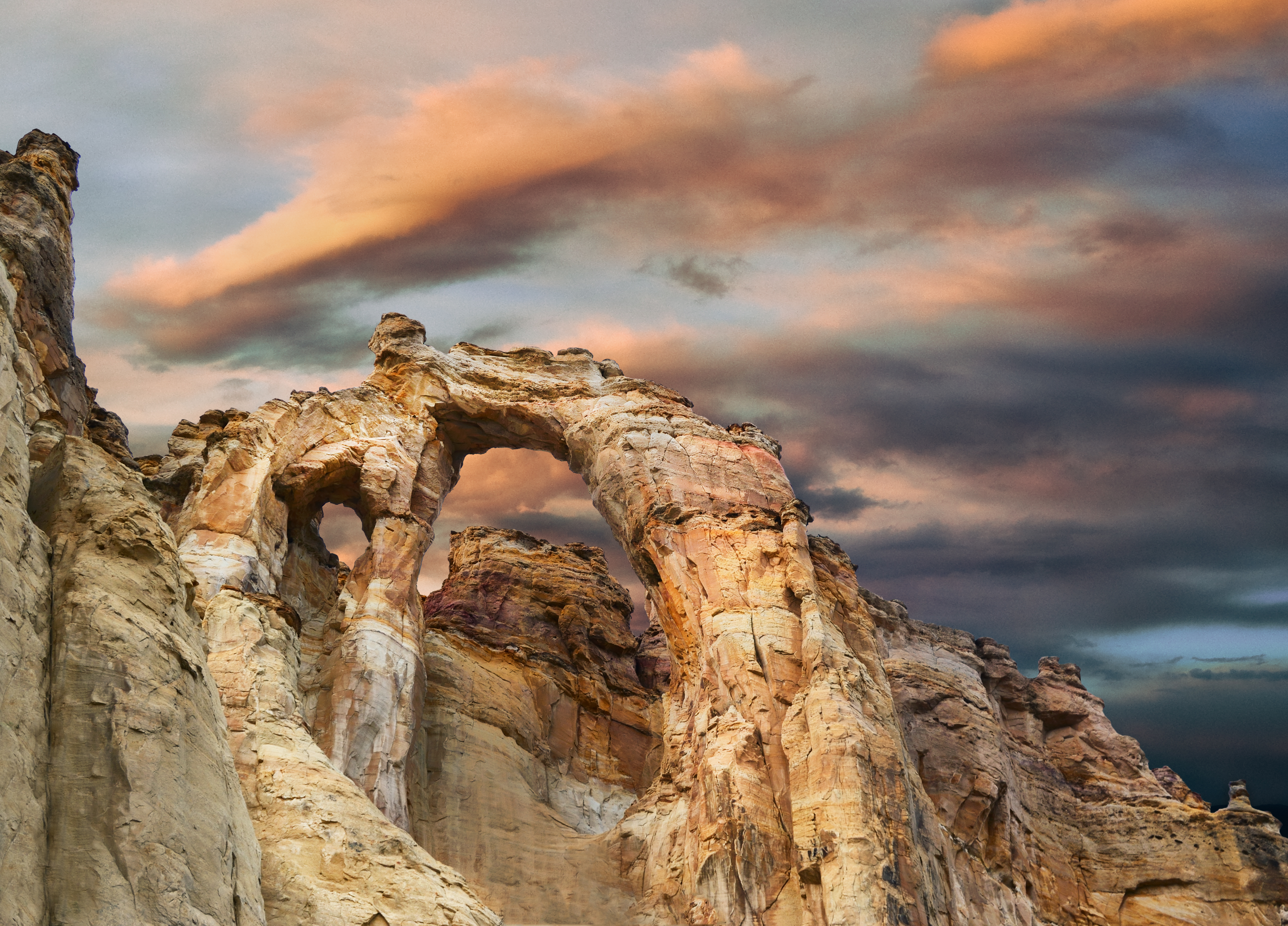
- View of Grosvenor Arch

- Location within Utah Location within the United States
- Coordinates: 37°27′24″N 111°49′54″W
- Location: Kane County, Utah, United States

Dimensions
  - Width: 92 ft (28 m)
  - Height: 150 ft (46 m)
- Elevation: 6,427 ft (1,959 m)

Grosvenor Arch is a unique sandstone double arch in southern Kane County, Utah, United States.

== Description ==
The arch is named to honor Gilbert Hovey Grosvenor (1875–1966), a president of the National Geographic Society, publishers of the National Geographic Magazine.

Located in northern Kane County, it is close to and south of Kodachrome Basin State Park and is accessed from the north or south via Cottonwood Canyon Road, a dirt road that traverses Cottonwood Canyon in the western portion of the national monument.

The site is well maintained and has an outhouse restroom and cement benches. There is a concrete sidewalk that goes almost to the base of the arch which is handicap accessible.
