= Cottonwood Canyon Road =

Road in Kane County, Utah, United States

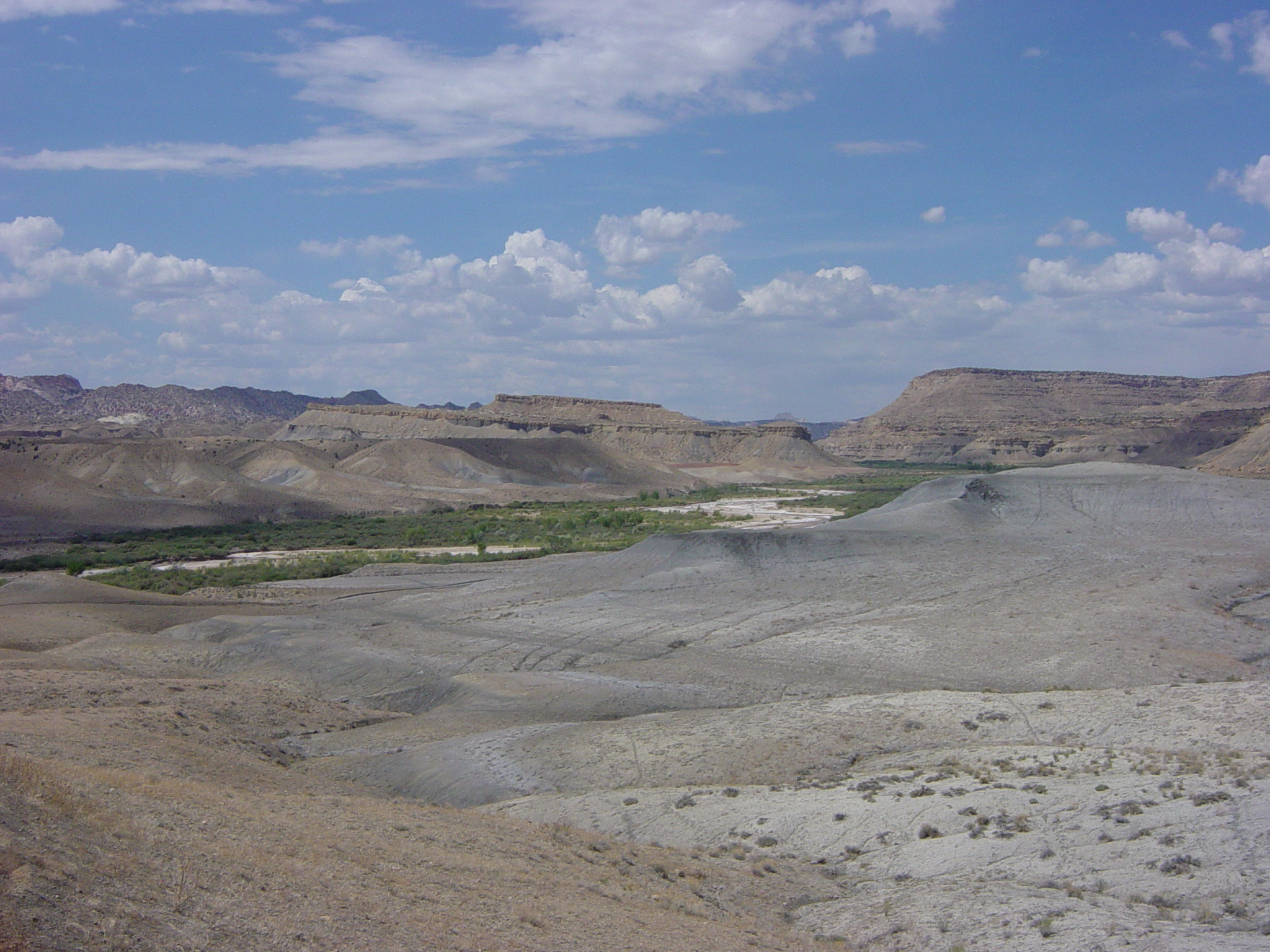
View when entering Cottonwood Canyon from the south after passing over higher elevations from US-89. The road follows the Paria River for the first several miles then continues to the north along the eroded East Kaibab Monocline adjacent to the steeply dipping rocks known as the Cockscomb.

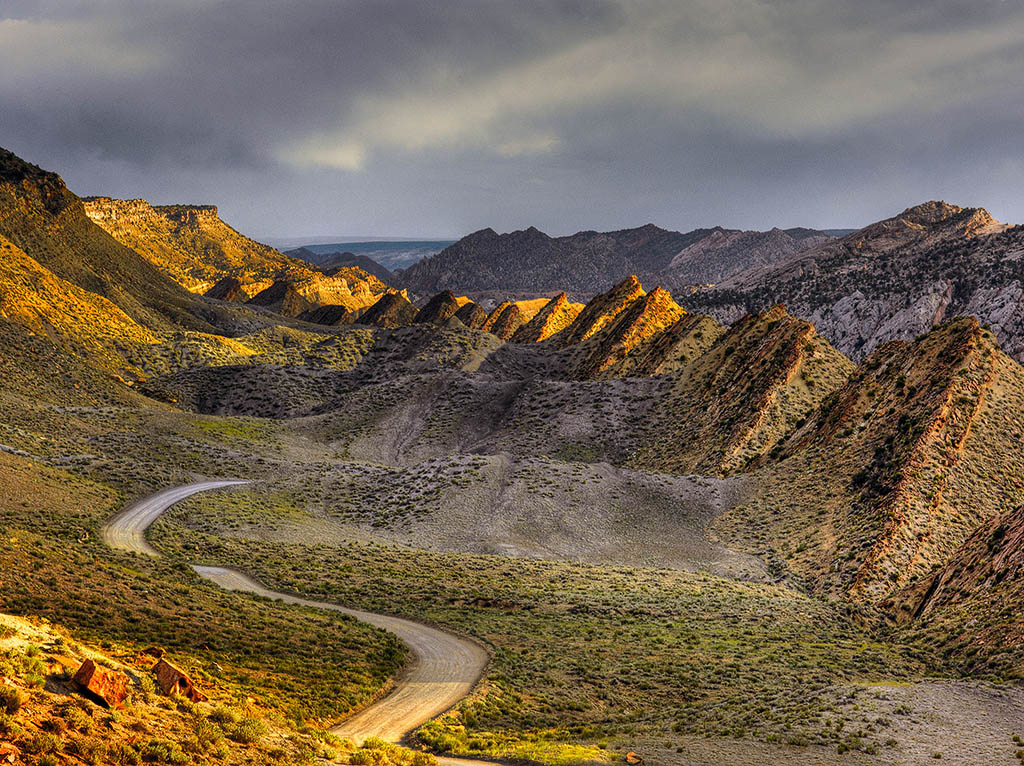
The Cockscomb at right runs along Cottonwood Canyon Road

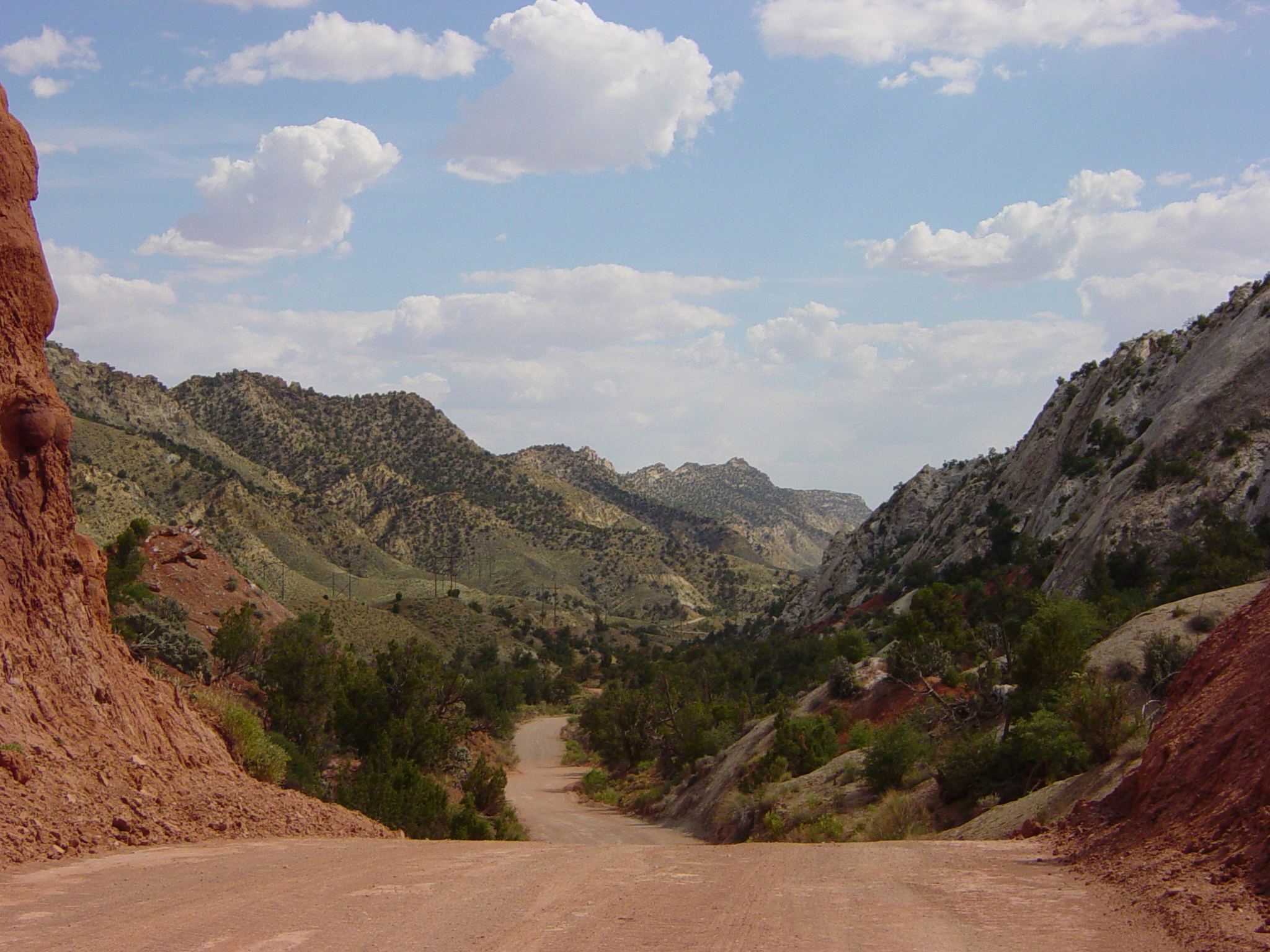
Along the monocline - view south at a terrain transition point where the south portion of the road shifts from the major valley to an adjacent and parallel minor valley

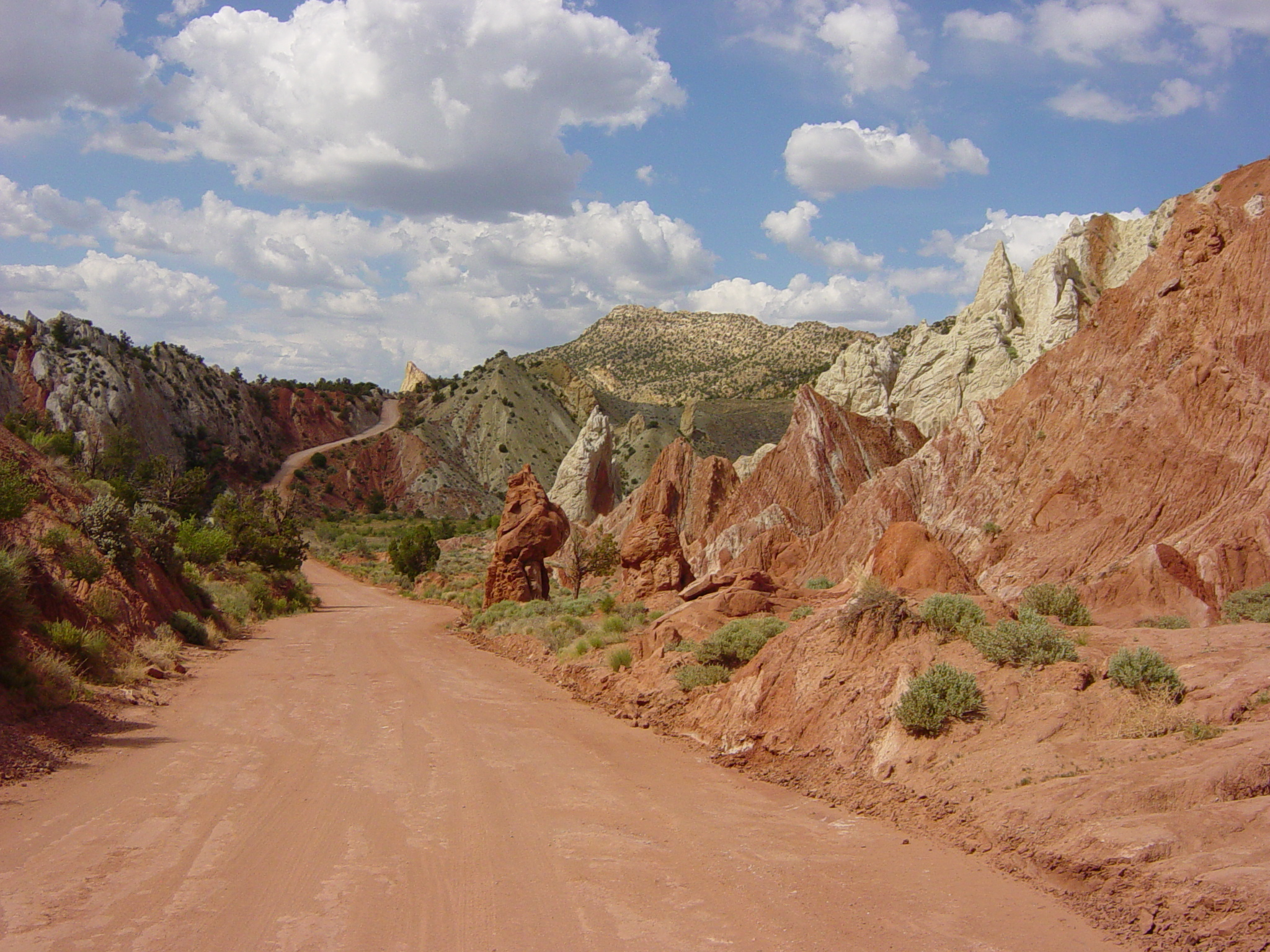
View north at the same location with the colorful rocks of the Cockscomb on the right

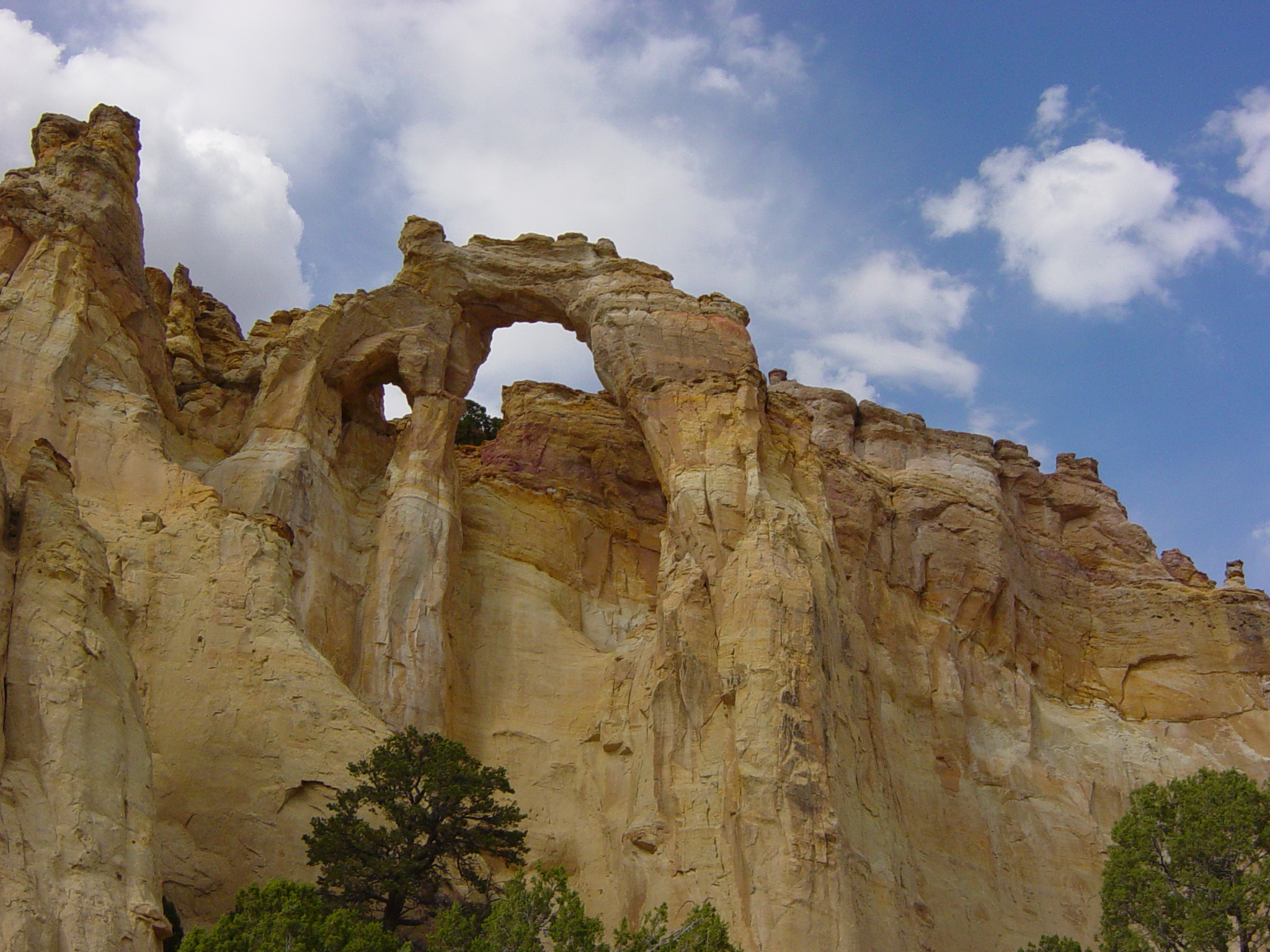
Grosvenor Arch

Cottonwood Canyon Road (also known as Road 400, Cottonwood Canyons Scenic Backway and K7000) is a scenic 46-mile (74 km) or 47-mile (76 km) dirt road that traverses Cottonwood Canyon in Kane County, Utah. The drive begins in Cannonville, just off Utah State Route 12, continues southward through Grand Staircase–Escalante National Monument, and eventually connects to U.S. Route 89.

The road was originally constructed as a maintenance road for power lines following the canyon. The drive takes roughly two hours without stops. There are visitor centers in Cannonville in the north, and in Big Water near the southern terminus.

Scenic attractions include Navajo Sandstone walls, Grosvenor Arch, and Kodachrome Basin State Park. The road allows access to hiking trails, such as Cottonwood Wash Narrows, Yellow Rock, Hackberry Canyon, and Cottonwood Canyon Narrows.

== Road Condition ==
The road is mostly unpaved, except for nine miles between Cannonville and Kodachrome Basin State Park. It's considered impassable in wet weather year-round.

Many sections of the road traverse ancient seabed deposits of mudstone, silt, and shale. When wet, the clay surface becomes exceptionally slick and even four wheel drive can be rendered useless. Additionally, many drainages cross the road in various locations, and these may wash out during periodic flash flooding, particularly during summer thunderstorms. Even in dry weather, the road can be muddy to the point of being impassable in low areas.

== Termini ==
The southern terminus is at the junction with US-89 in Kane County: 37°06′18″N 111°50′49″W. The northern terminus is at Kane County line near Cannonville, where it becomes Kodachrome Road: 37°32′08″N 112°03′04″W.
