= Escalante Petrified Forest State Park =

State park in Utah, United States

- IUCN category V (protected landscape/seascape)
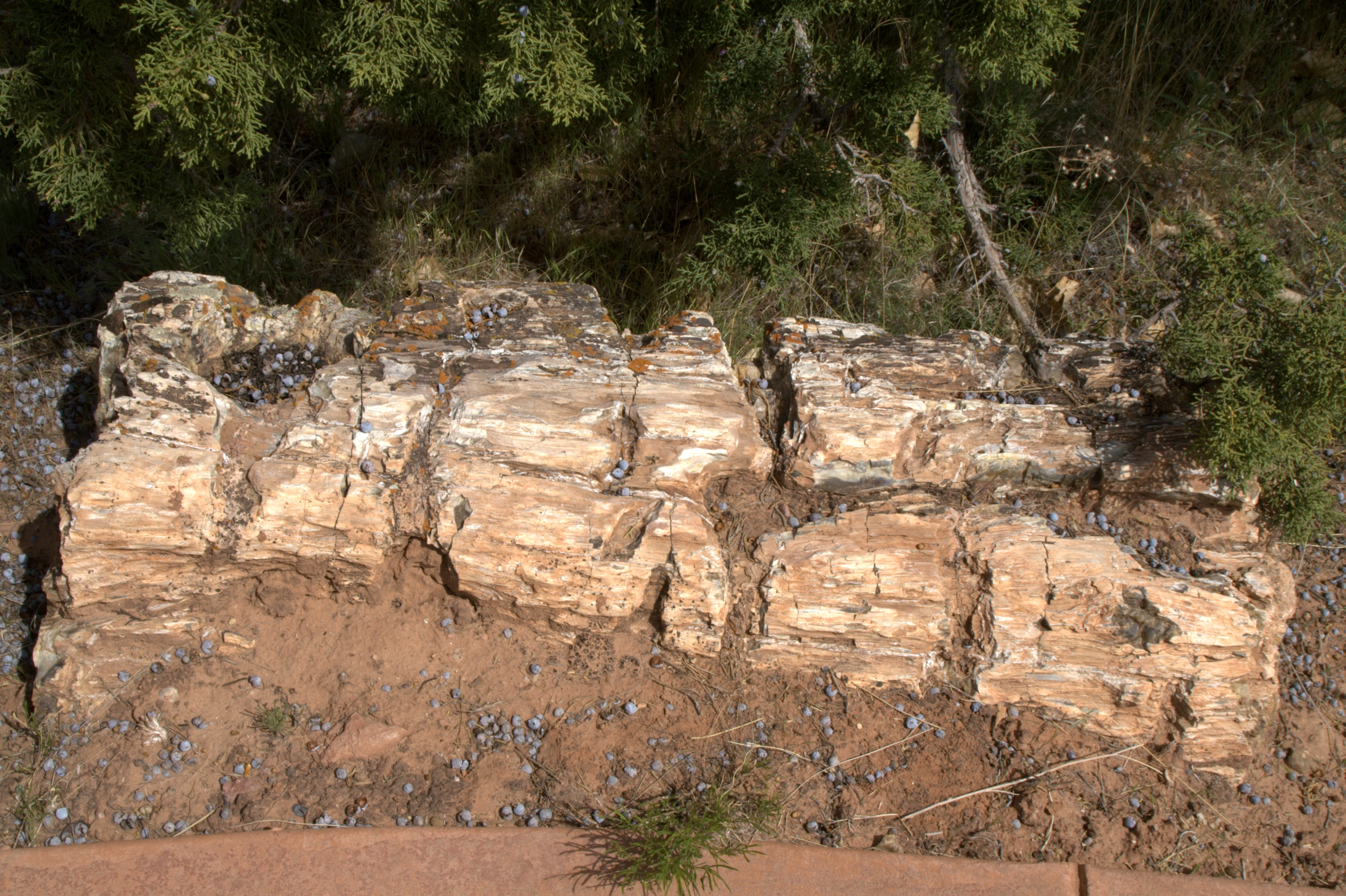
- Large piece of petrified wood in Escalante Petrified Forest State Park

- Location within Utah Location within the United States
- Location: Garfield, Utah, United States
- Coordinates: 37°47′16″N 111°37′46″W
- Area: 1,350 acres (5.5 km^{2})
- Elevation: 5,900 ft (1,800 m)
- Established: 1976
- Visitors: 73,969 (in 2022)
- Governing body: Utah State Parks
- Website: Official website

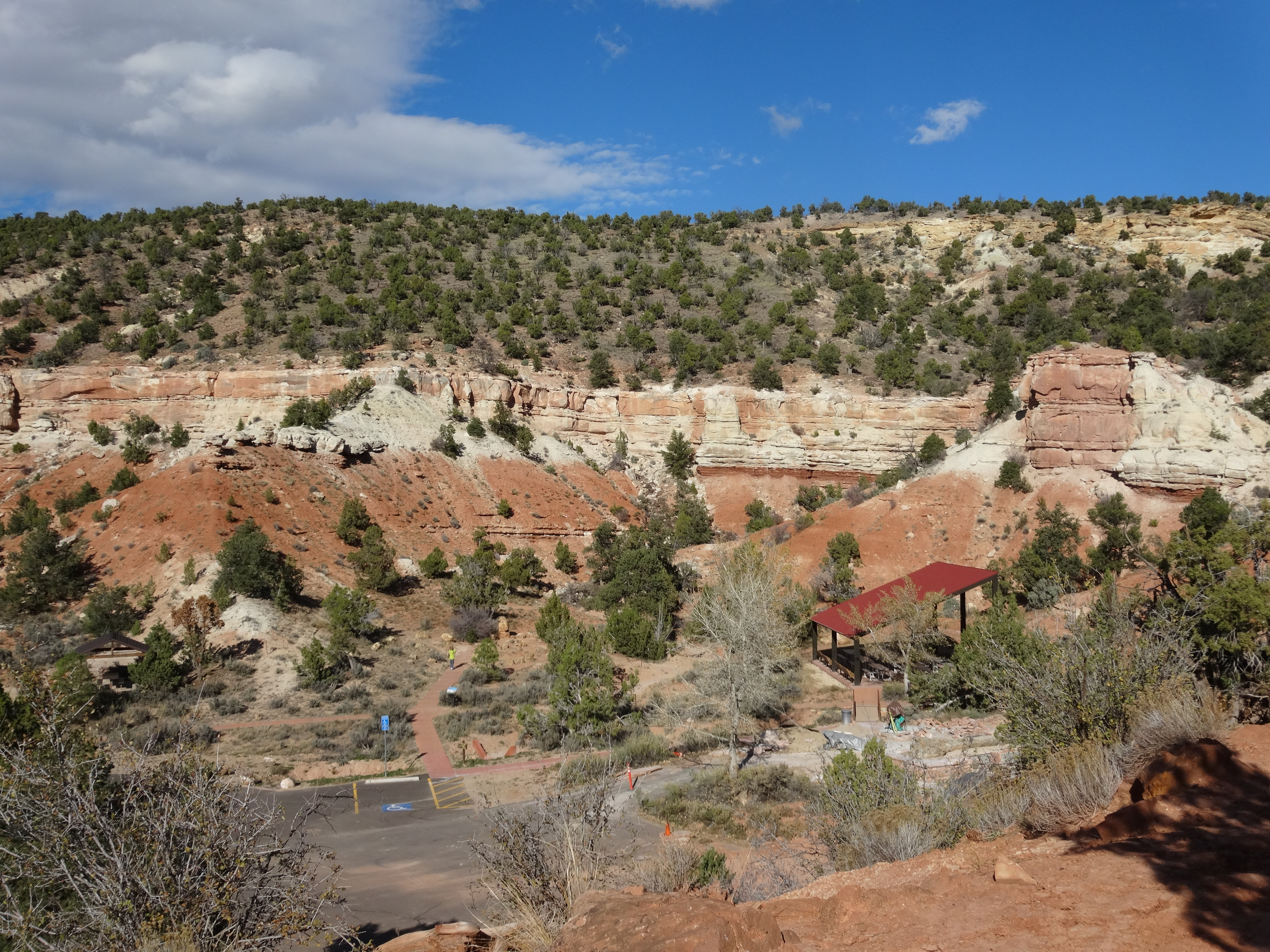
Morrison Formation (all three members) exposed at Escalante Petrified Forest State Park,

Escalante Petrified Forest State Park (also known as Escalante State Park) is a state park in Utah, United States, located 0.8 km north of Escalante. The park features a high mesa that was once an ancient floodplain. Approximately 135 to 155 million years ago, large trees were buried in mud during floods. Groundwater eventually replaced the organic material with silica, preserving the wood as fossils through permineralization. Erosion has exposed these petrified logs, which were prized by hobbyists before the park's establishment. The logs are believed to be from conifers transported by a river before being buried and fossilized as agate.

The varied colors of the petrified wood are due to different minerals absorbed during petrification. Iron oxides contribute to the orange, red, and yellow hues, while manganese oxides create blues, blacks, and purples.

== History ==
In 1872, Almon Harris Thompson, a member of John Wesley Powell’s survey expedition, explored the Escalante River region and named it after the Spanish explorer Silvestre Vélez de Escalante. The Wide Hollow Reservoir was constructed in 1954 to provide irrigation for the town of Escalante. Escalante Petrified Forest was officially opened to the public as a state park in 1976. In 2014, a 50-foot (15 m) petrified log from the Morrison Formation was added to the visitor center exhibits.

== Flora and fauna ==
The park environment is dominated by pinyon pine and Utah juniper, hosting wildlife such as pronghorn antelope, coyote, and mule deer.

Wide Hollow Reservoir provides a wetland habitat supporting over 100 bird species, including bald eagles and osprey. The reservoir is a managed fishery stocked with largemouth bass, tiger trout, and rainbow trout. It also contains populations of bluegill and black crappie.

== Activities ==
Trails

- Petrified Forest Trail: A one-mile (1.6 km) loop that winds up a mesa where most of the fossil wood is eroding from the conglomerate capping.
- Sleeping Rainbows Trail: An optional 0.75-mile (1.21 km) loop off the Petrified Forest Trail that is steeper and requires scrambling over rocks.

Camping

The park features a 22-unit campground with basic amenities, including restrooms and a group campsite. Reservations can be made up to 16 weeks in advance.

== Folklore and the "Petrified Wood Curse" ==
According to local legend, visitors who remove pieces of petrified wood from the park suffer from bad luck, a belief often attributed to ancient spirits guarding the land. This phenomenon is a documented example of legend tripping and contemporary folklore in the American West, with stories of misfortune dating back to the 1930s.

The park maintains a display of "conscience letters" sent by visitors who returned stolen wood. These letters frequently describe experiences such as financial loss, medical emergencies, and house fires occurring shortly after the wood was taken. One notable 2004 letter detailed a series of broken bones and a fire that the sender attributed to a small stolen specimen.

Some folklorists connect the legend to Navajo mythology, which identifies petrified wood as the bones of the giant Yei Tso (or Yietso). Desecrating these remains is traditionally considered a dangerous act. While park officials primarily use the legend to discourage theft, the frequency of returned packages remains high, with roughly a dozen such parcels received annually.

== Image gallery ==
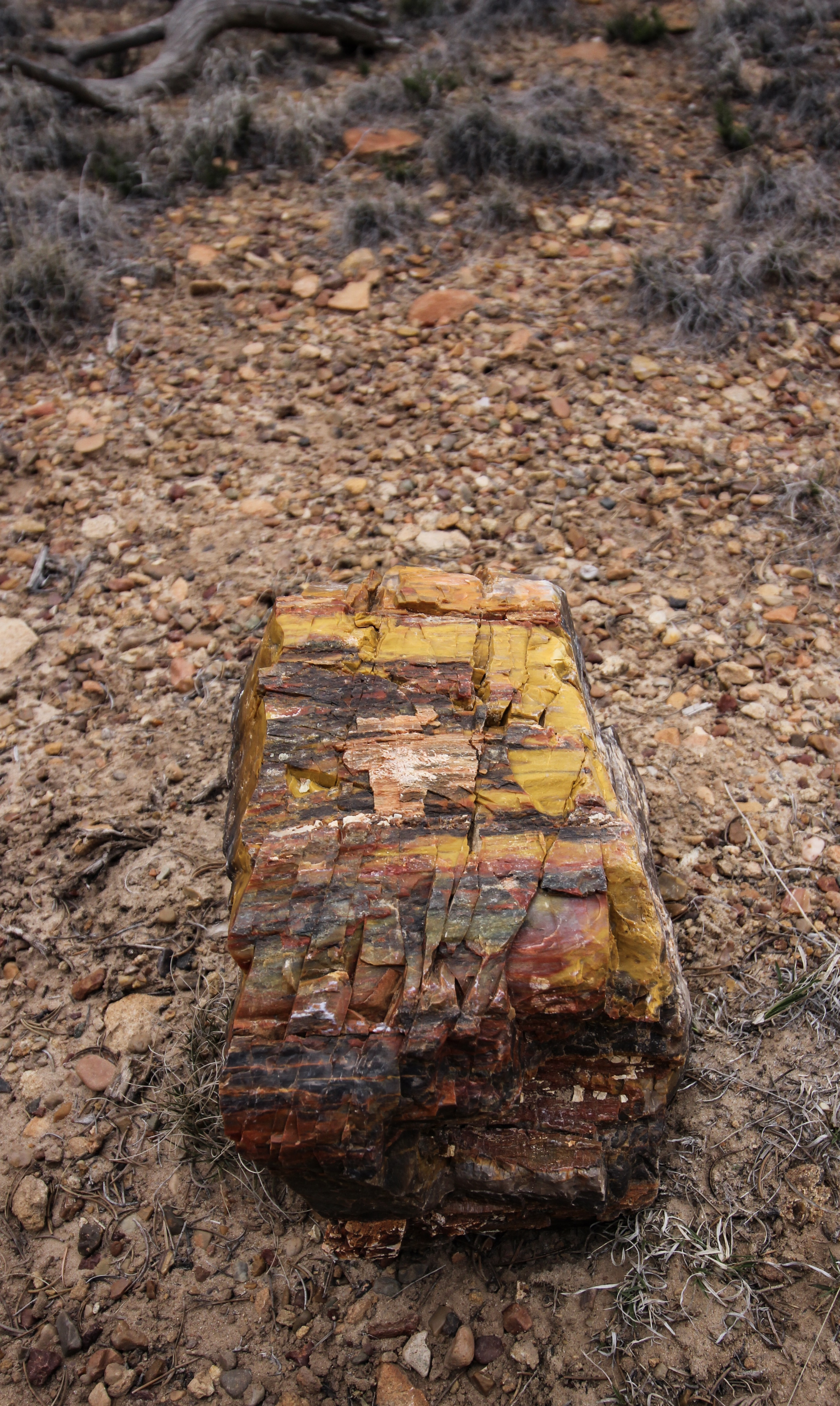
Petrified wood

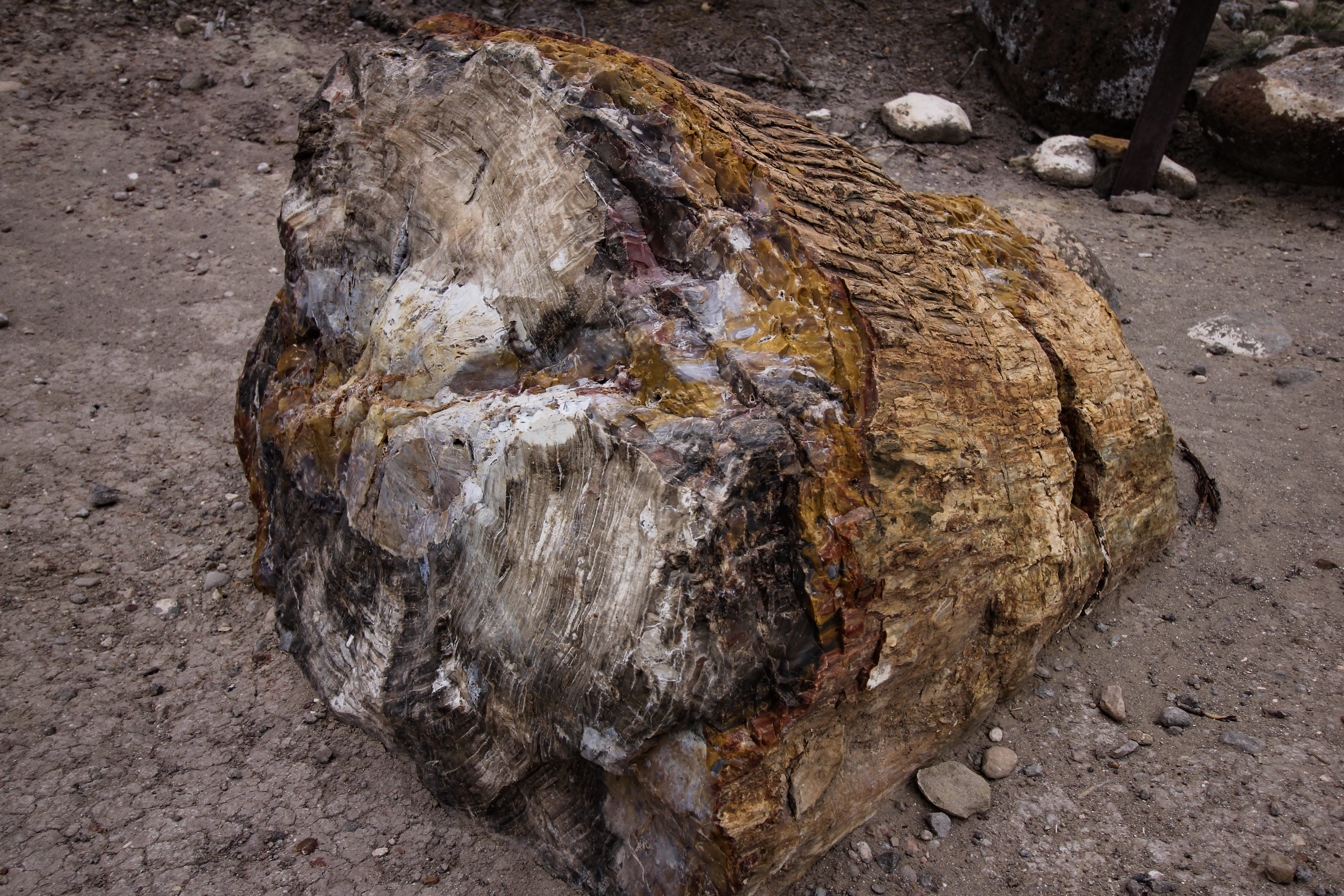
Petrified wood

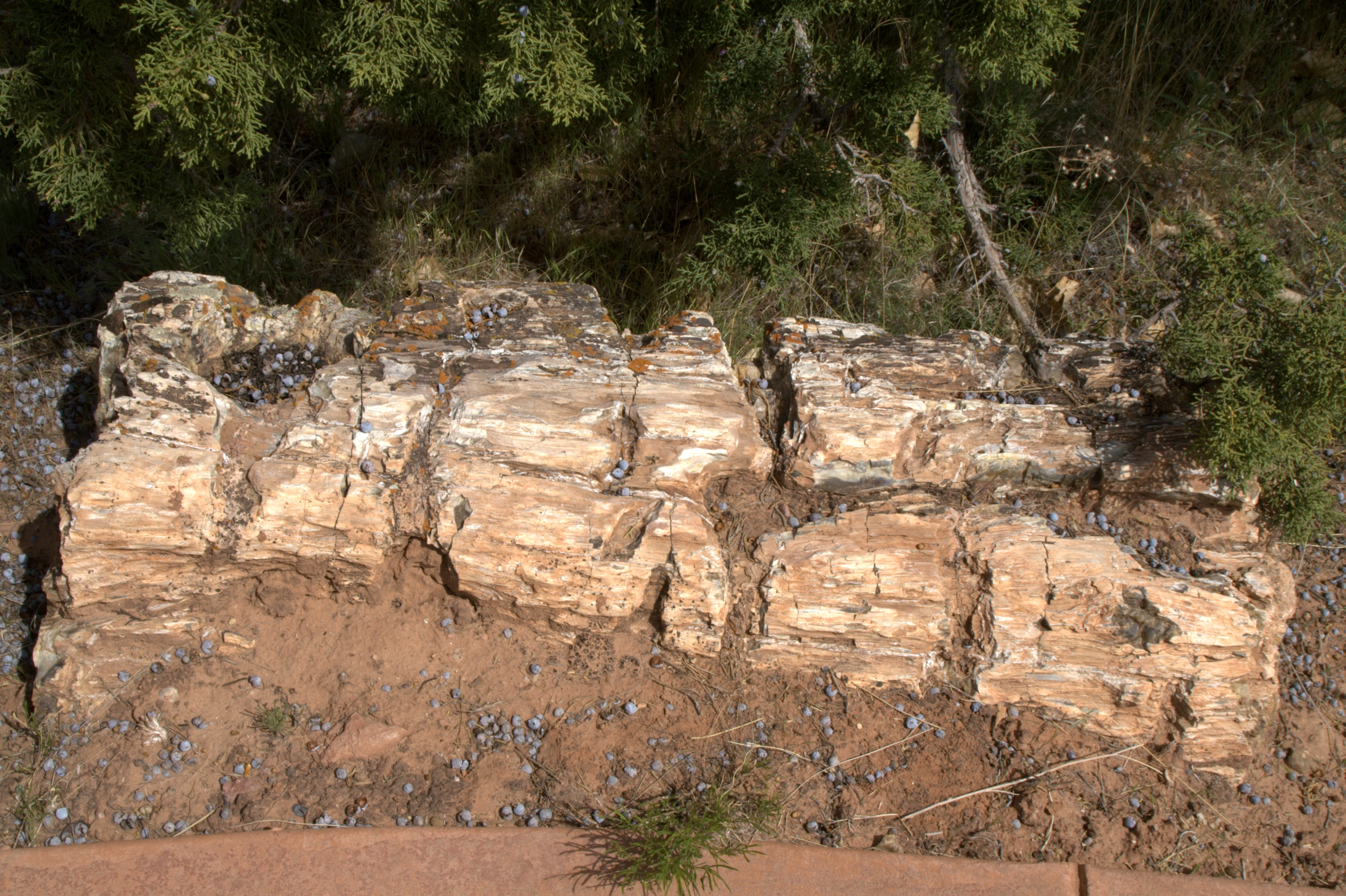
Large piece of petrified wood

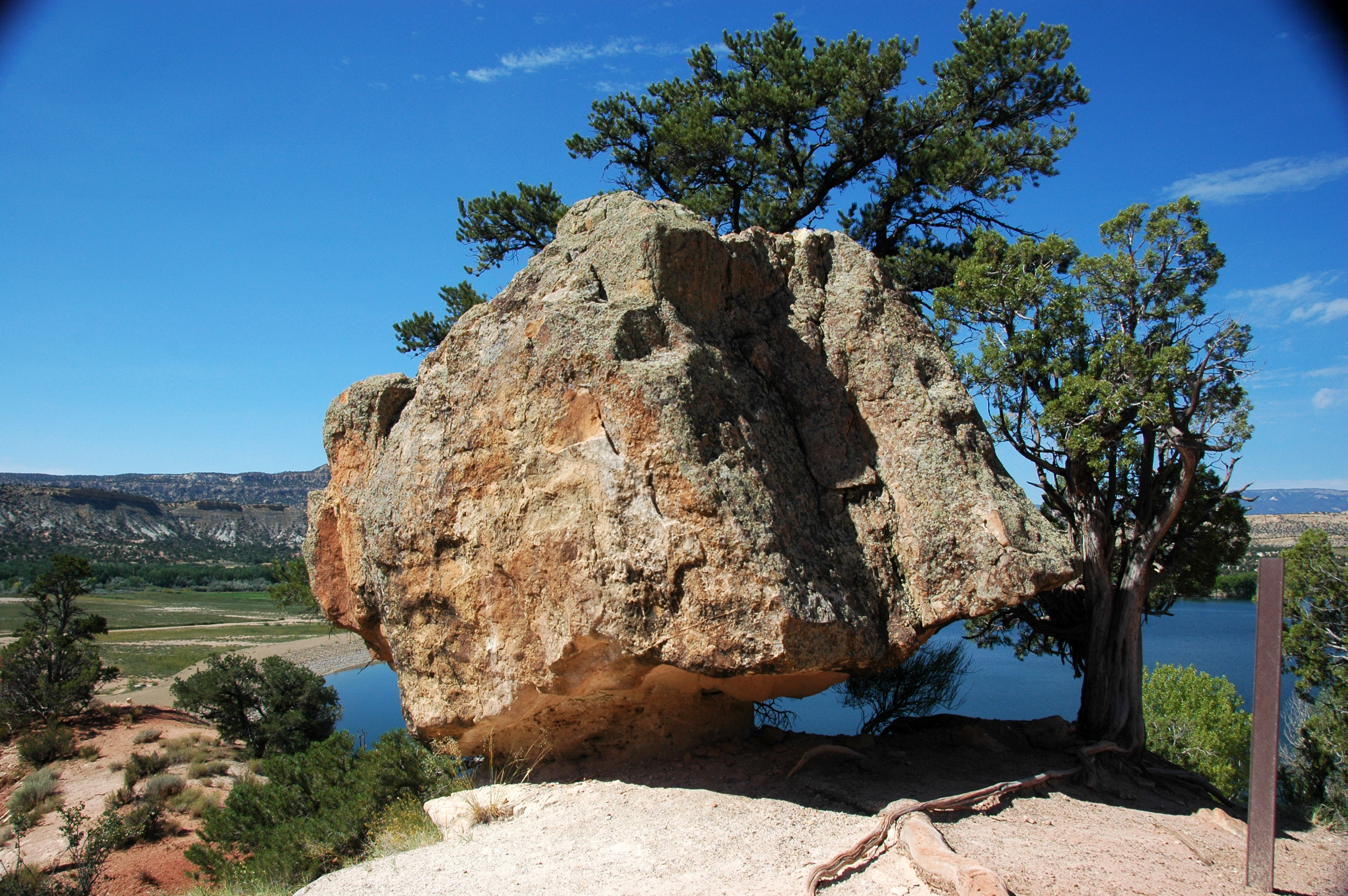
Balanced rock

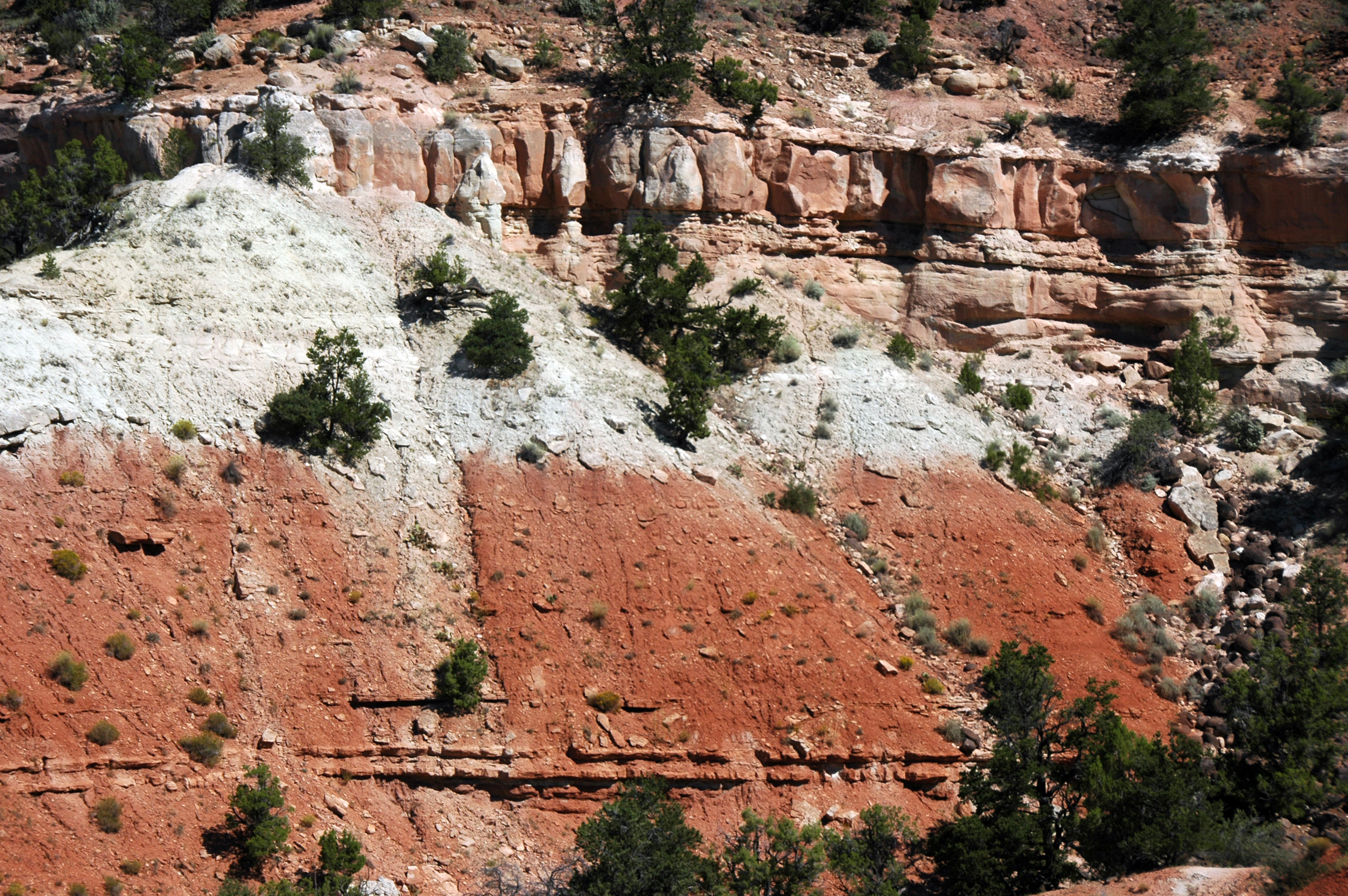
Morrison Formation

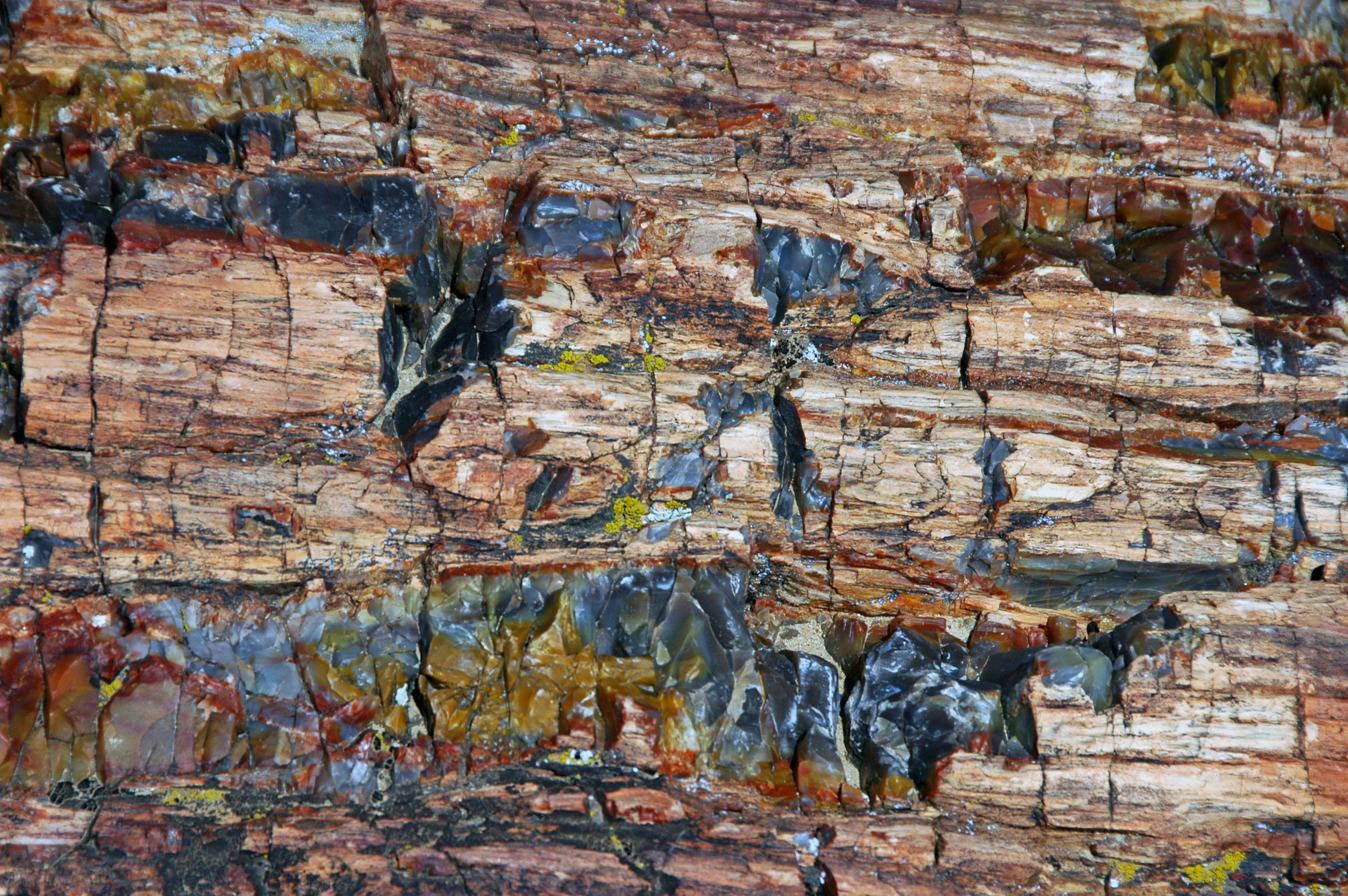
Petrified wood forms through permineralization.

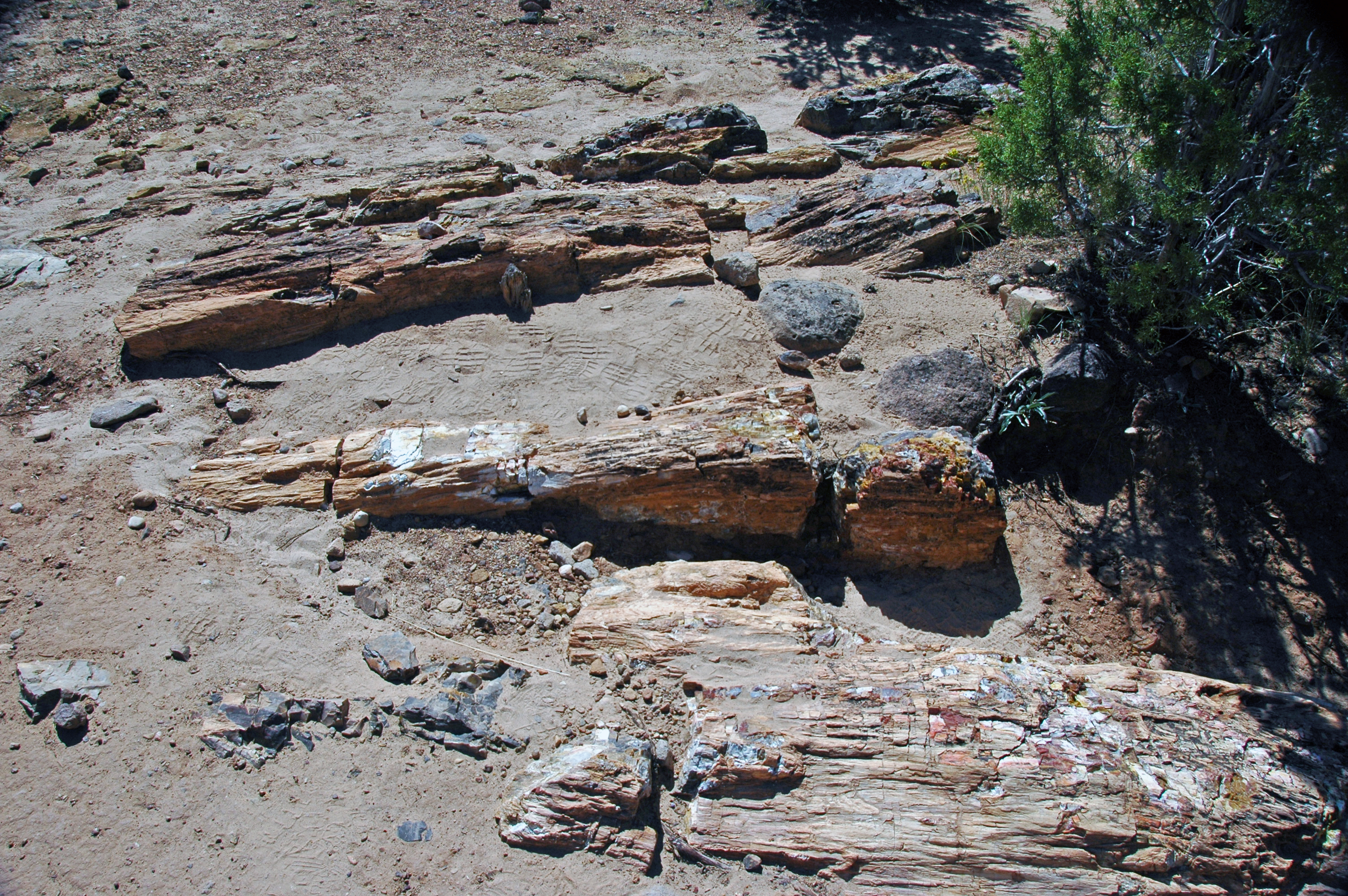
Petrified logs in place

A 50-foot fossil log from the Morrison Formation.
