= Cottonwood Canyon (Kane County, Utah) =

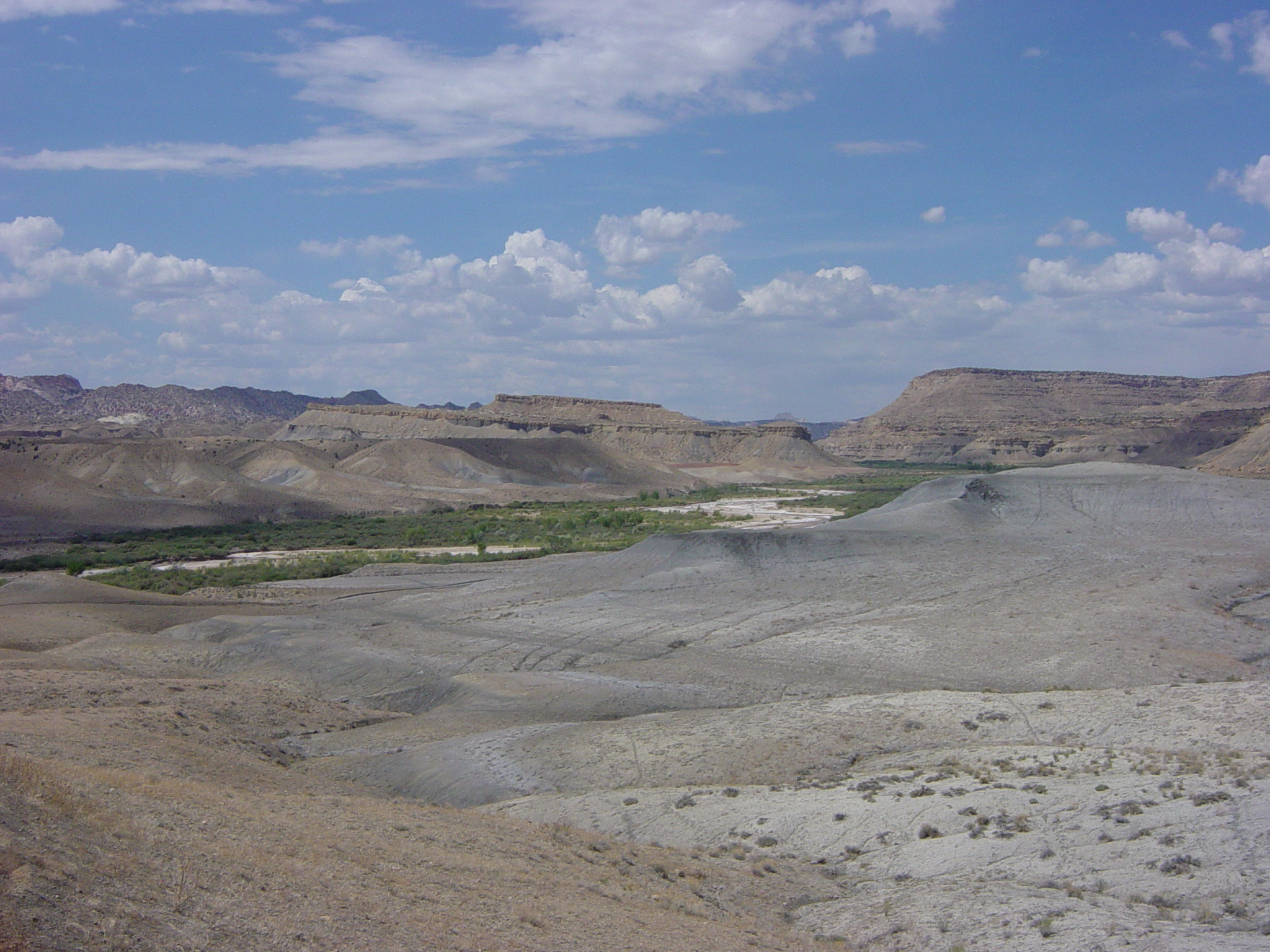
- View when entering the canyon on Cottonwood Canyon Road from the south after passing over higher elevations from U.S. Route 89. The road will follow the watercourse for a while and then (not following the stream) will continue away to the north, following an eroded geologic fault.

- Location within Utah Location within the United States
- Elevation: 5,023 feet (1,531 m)

Third Approach
- Location: Kane County
- Coordinates: 37°20′37″N 111°52′14″W

Cottonwood Canyon is a canyon in central Kane County, Utah United States.

== Description ==
The canyon is a water-carved canyon that has eroded along weak locations in the Earth's crust at the joins between major geological regions. To the east are the lower steps of the Grand Staircase, which is not visible from the road, and to the north is the Kaiparowits Plateau.

== See also ==
- List of canyons and gorges in Utah
- Cottonwood Canyon Road - a dirt road that passes through varied geological features, including a portion of Cottonwood Canyon
