= Tropic, Utah =

Town in Garfield County, Utah, United States

- Town
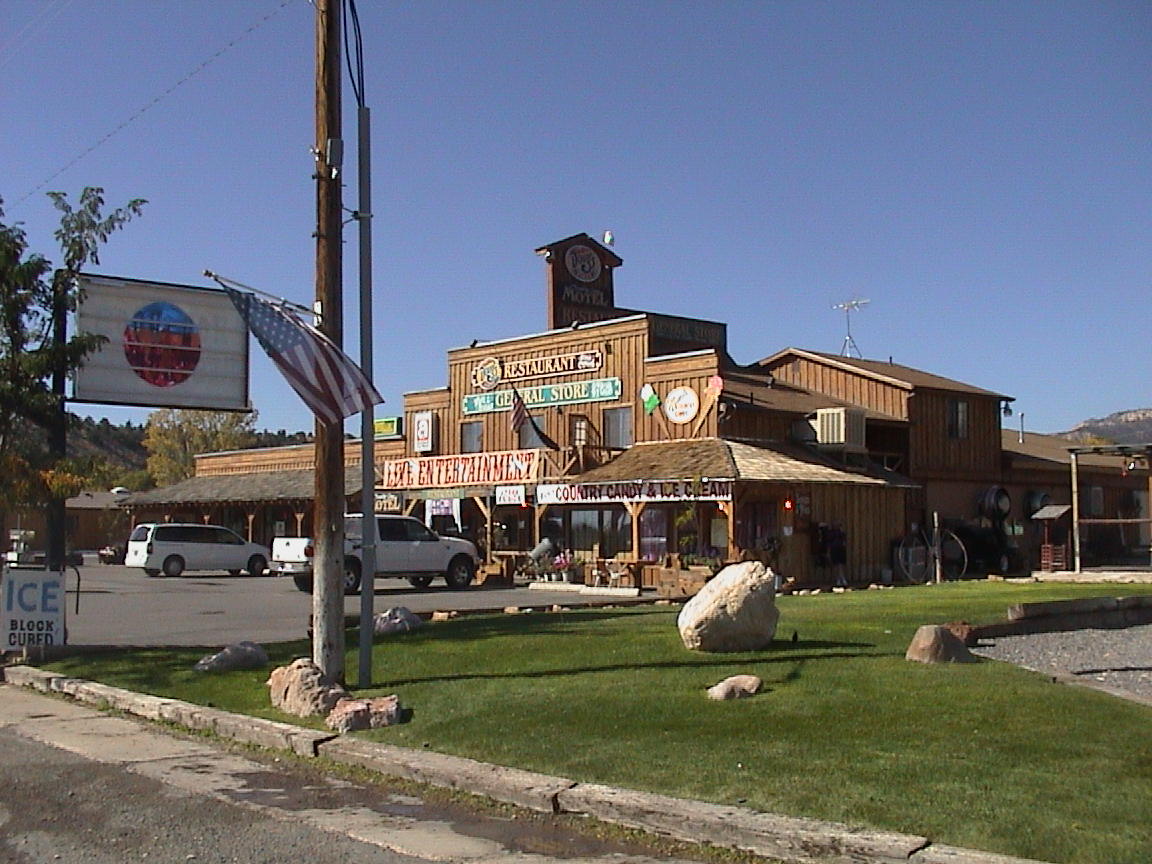
- General store in Tropic (©2001 SW Clyde, courtesy of byways.org)

- Location in Garfield County and state of Utah
- Coordinates: 37°37′25″N 112°5′19″W
- Country: United States
- State: Utah
- County: Garfield

Government
  - Mayor: Travis LeFevre
  - Town Clerk: Dani Harding

Area
  - Total: 7.93 sq mi (20.55 km^{2})
  - Land: 7.92 sq mi (20.50 km^{2})
  - Water: 0.023 sq mi (0.06 km^{2})
- Elevation: 6,309 ft (1,923 m)

Population (2020)
  - Total: 486
  - Estimate (2019): 514
  - Density: 65.0/sq mi (25.08/km^{2})
- Time zone: UTC-7 (Mountain (MST))
  - Summer (DST): UTC-6 (MDT)
- ZIP code: 84776
- Area code: 435
- FIPS code: 49-77560
- GNIS feature ID: 1446722
- Website: www.townoftropicut.gov

Tropic is a town in Garfield County, Utah, United States, along Utah State Route 12 (A Journey Through Time Scenic Byway / Scenic Byway 12). As of the 2020 census, the town had a population of 486. Tropic was founded in 1891.

== Geography ==
Tropic is in southern Garfield County along Utah Route 12, 7.5 miles (12.1 km) southeast of Bryce Canyon City and 5 miles (8 km) north of Cannonville. It is in the Tropic Valley, drained by the Paria River, a tributary of the Colorado River.

According to the United States Census Bureau, the town has a total area of 8.4 square miles (21.7 km^{2}), of which 0.02 square miles (0.06 km^{2}), or 0.26%, are water.

== Demographics ==
Historical population
Census	Pop.	Note	%±
1900	379		—
1910	358		−5.5%
1920	474		32.4%
1930	447		−5.7%
1940	514		15.0%
1950	483		−6.0%
1960	382		−20.9%
1970	329		−13.9%
1980	338		2.7%
1990	374		10.7%
2000	508		35.8%
2010	530		4.3%
2020	486		−8.3%
U.S. Decennial Census

As of the census of 2000, there were 508 people in the town, organized into 160 households and 132 families. The population density was 60.6 people per square mile (23.4/km^{2}). There were 206 housing units at an average density of 24.6 per square mile (9.5/km^{2}). The racial makeup of the town was 96.06% White, 0.39% Native American, 1.38% from other races, and 2.17% from two or more races. There were no African Americans, Asians, or Pacific Islanders. 2.36% of the population were Hispanic or Latino of any race.

There were 160 households, out of which 41.9% had children under 18 living with them, 73.8% were married couples living together, 5.6% had a female householder with no husband present, and 16.9% were non-families. 13.8% of all households were made up of individuals, and 8.1% had someone who was 65 years of age or older living alone. The average household size was 3.18, and the average family size was 3.52.

The town's population was spread out, with 34.6% under 18, 7.5% from 18 to 24, 22.0% from 25 to 44, 21.7% from 45 to 64, and 14.2% who were 65 years of age or older. The median age was 32 years. For every 100 females, there were 100 males. For every 100 females aged 18 and over, there were 91.9 males.

The median income for a household in the town was $42,500, and the median income for a family was $44,125. Males had a median income of $32,500 versus $22,222 for females. The per capita income for the town was $13,896. 2.1% of the population and 3.0% of families were below the poverty line. Out of the total population, 1.0% of those under 18 and 10.0% of those 65 and older lived below the poverty line.

== Notable person ==
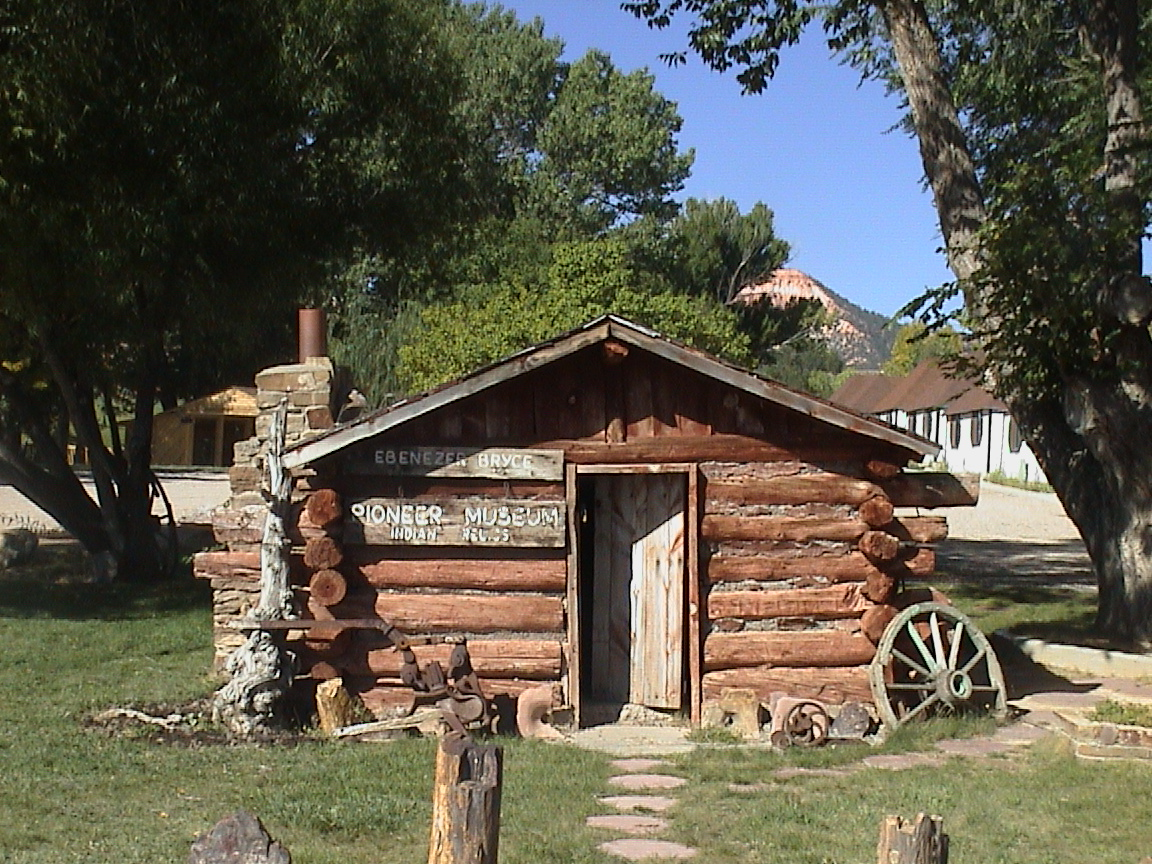
Cabin of Ebenezer Bryce (©2001 SW Clyde, courtesy of byways.org)

- *Wanda Day, drummer of the rock band 4 Non Blondes. Day died on July 10, 1997 at age 36. She is buried in the Tropic Cemetery.

== See also ==
- List of municipalities in Utah
