= Henrieville, Utah =

Town in the state of Utah, United States

- Town
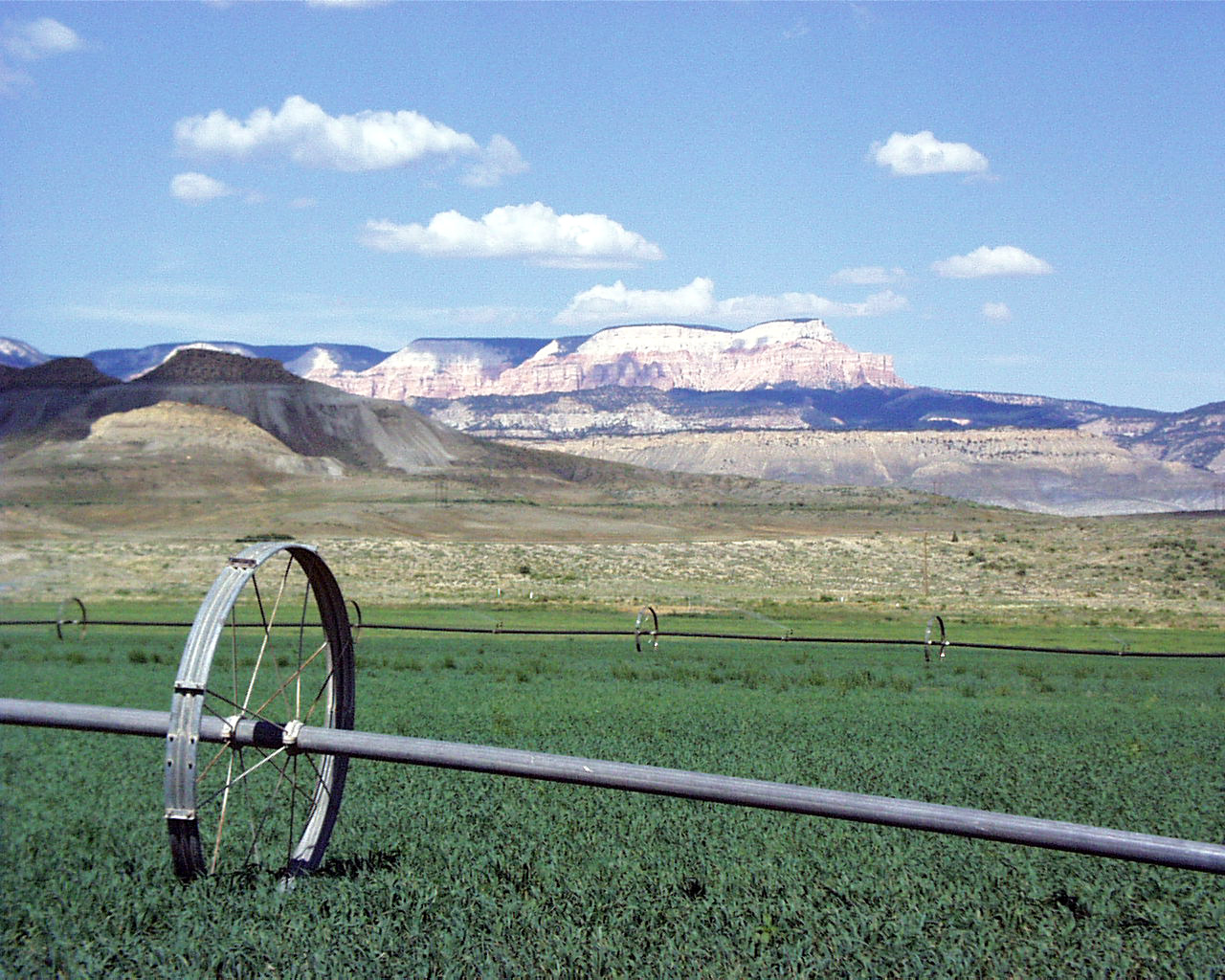
- Rolling irrigation pipes keep fields green in Henrieville.

- Location in Garfield County and state of Utah
- Coordinates: 37°33′48″N 111°59′43″W
- Country: United States
- State: Utah
- County: Garfield
- Settled: 1878
- Incorporated: 1934
- Named after: James Henrie

Area
  - Total: 1.34 sq mi (3.48 km^{2})
  - Land: 1.34 sq mi (3.48 km^{2})
  - Water: 0 sq mi (0.00 km^{2})
- Elevation: 5,998 ft (1,828 m)

Population (2020)
  - Total: 221
  - Estimate (2024): 231
  - Density: 167.3/sq mi (64.58/km^{2})
- Time zone: UTC-7 (Mountain (MST))
  - Summer (DST): UTC-6 (MDT)
- ZIP code: 84736
- Area code: 435
- FIPS code: 49-34750
- GNIS feature ID: 1428663

Henrieville is a town in Garfield County, Utah, United States, along Utah Scenic Byway 12. As of the 2020 census, the town population was 221.

The community was named after James Henrie, a Mormon leader.

== Geography ==
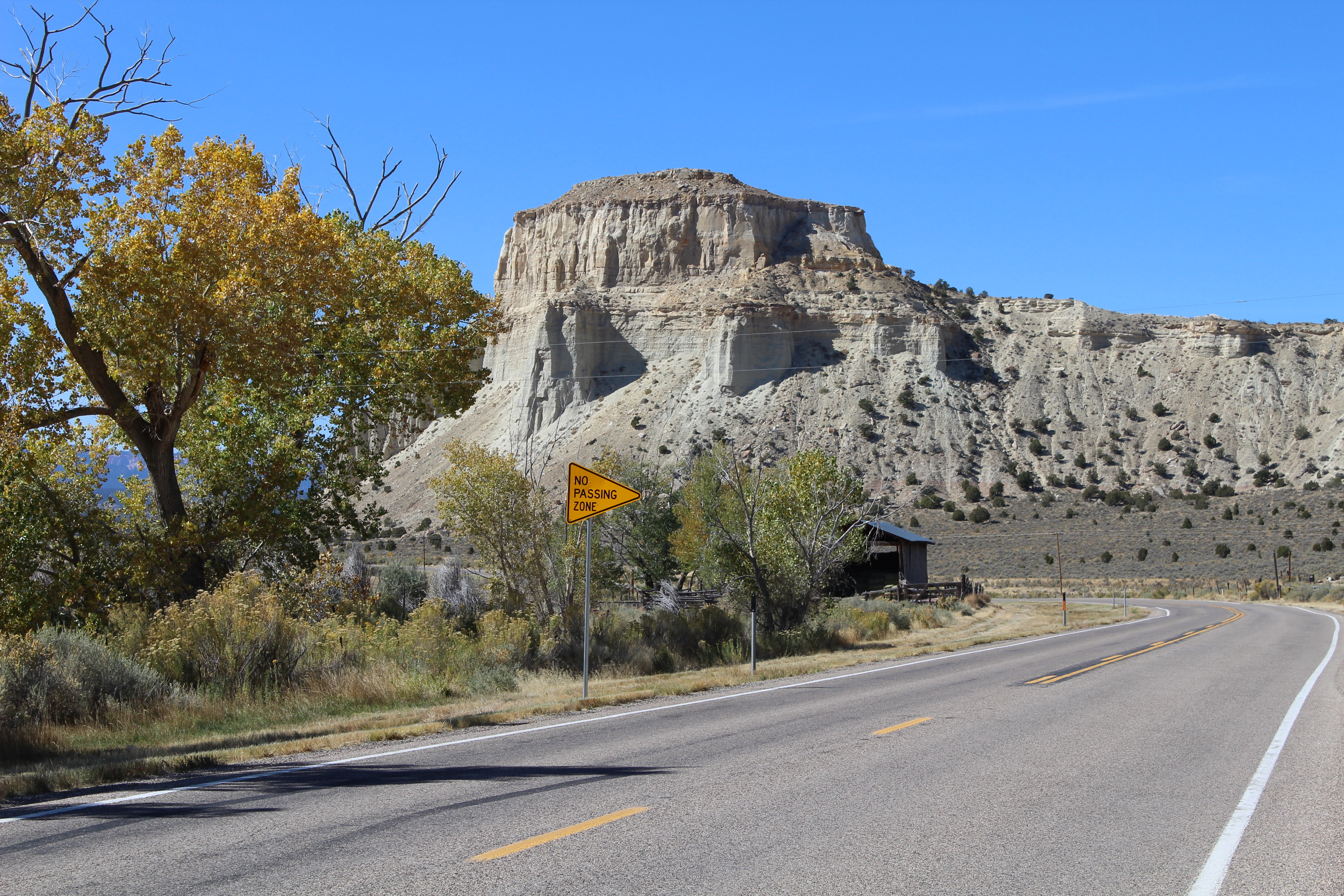
View to the west of Henrieville

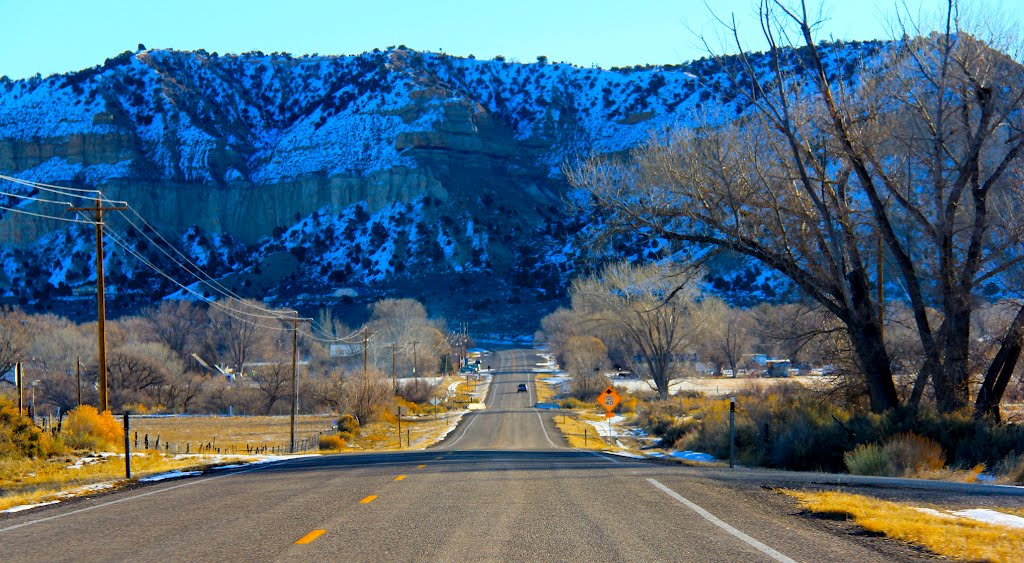
Entering Henrieville along Utah State Route 12

Henrieville is in southern Garfield County, along Utah State Route 12. It is 15 miles (24 km) southeast of Bryce Canyon City and 30 miles (48 km) southwest of Escalante. Cannonville, the closest neighboring town, is 3.5 miles (5.6 km) to the west on Route 12.

According to the United States Census Bureau, Henrieville has a total area of 1.5 square miles (4.0 km^{2}), all land.

=== Climate ===
The climate in this area has mild differences between highs and lows, and there is adequate rainfall year-round. According to the Köppen Climate Classification system, Henrieville has a hot and cold arid desert climate, abbreviated "BWk" on climate maps.

Climate data for Henrieville, Utah
Month	Jan	Feb	Mar	Apr	May	Jun	Jul	Aug	Sep	Oct	Nov	Dec	Year
Mean daily maximum °F (°C)	42.4 (5.8)	48.0 (8.9)	54.0 (12.2)	61.5 (16.4)	71.8 (22.1)	82.6 (28.1)	88.2 (31.2)	85.5 (29.7)	77.5 (25.3)	67.8 (19.9)	52.0 (11.1)	43.5 (6.4)	64.6 (18.1)
Daily mean °F (°C)	29.5 (−1.4)	33.6 (0.9)	37.6 (3.1)	44.8 (7.1)	54.7 (12.6)	63.0 (17.2)	70.3 (21.3)	68.2 (20.1)	60.4 (15.8)	53.1 (11.7)	39.4 (4.1)	28.2 (−2.1)	48.6 (9.2)
Mean daily minimum °F (°C)	13.5 (−10.3)	18.7 (−7.4)	23.4 (−4.8)	28.6 (−1.9)	36.0 (2.2)	44.2 (6.8)	51.6 (10.9)	49.6 (9.8)	42.1 (5.6)	33.3 (0.7)	21.7 (−5.7)	13.5 (−10.3)	31.4 (−0.4)
Average precipitation inches (mm)	0.8 (21)	0.8 (20)	0.9 (23)	0.7 (18)	0.7 (17)	0.4 (11)	0.9 (24)	1.3 (34)	0.9 (24)	1.0 (25)	1.1 (27)	0.8 (21)	10.3 (265)
Average snowfall inches (cm)	9.3 (23.6)	6.6 (16.8)	2.8 (7.1)	2.2 (5.6)	0 (0)	0 (0)	0 (0)	0 (0)	0 (0)	0.4 (1)	3.1 (7.9)	5.6 (14.2)	30 (76.2)
Mean daily daylight hours	10.4	11.3	12.4	13.7	14.7	15.2	14.9	14	12.8	11.6	10.6	10.1	12.6
Source: Weatherbase

== Demographics ==
Historical population
Census	Pop.	Note	%±
1900	181		—
1910	158		−12.7%
1920	170		7.6%
1930	207		21.8%
1940	241		16.4%
1950	114		−52.7%
1960	152		33.3%
1970	145		−4.6%
1980	167		15.2%
1990	163		−2.4%
2000	159		−2.5%
2010	230		44.7%
2020	221		−3.9%
2024 (est.)	231	▲	4.5%
U.S. Decennial Census

As of the census of 2000, there were 159 people, 57 households, and 40 families residing in the town. The population density was 941.9 people per square mile (361.1/km^{2}). There were 83 housing units at an average density of 491.7 per square mile (188.5/km^{2}). The racial makeup of the town was 99.37% White and 0.63% Native American. Hispanic or Latino of any race were 1.89% of the population.

There were 57 households, out of which 33.3% had children under the age of 18 living with them, 64.9% were married couples living together, 7.0% had a female householder with no husband present, and 28.1% were non-families. 26.3% of all households were made up of individuals, and 17.5% had someone living alone who was 65 years of age or older. The average household size was 2.79, and the average family size was 3.41.

In the town, the population was spread out, with 32.1% under 18, 6.3% from 18 to 24, 20.8% from 25 to 44, 22.6% from 45 to 64, and 18.2% who were 65 years of age or older. The median age was 37 years. For every 100 females, there were 74.7 males. For every ten females aged 18 and over, there were eight males.

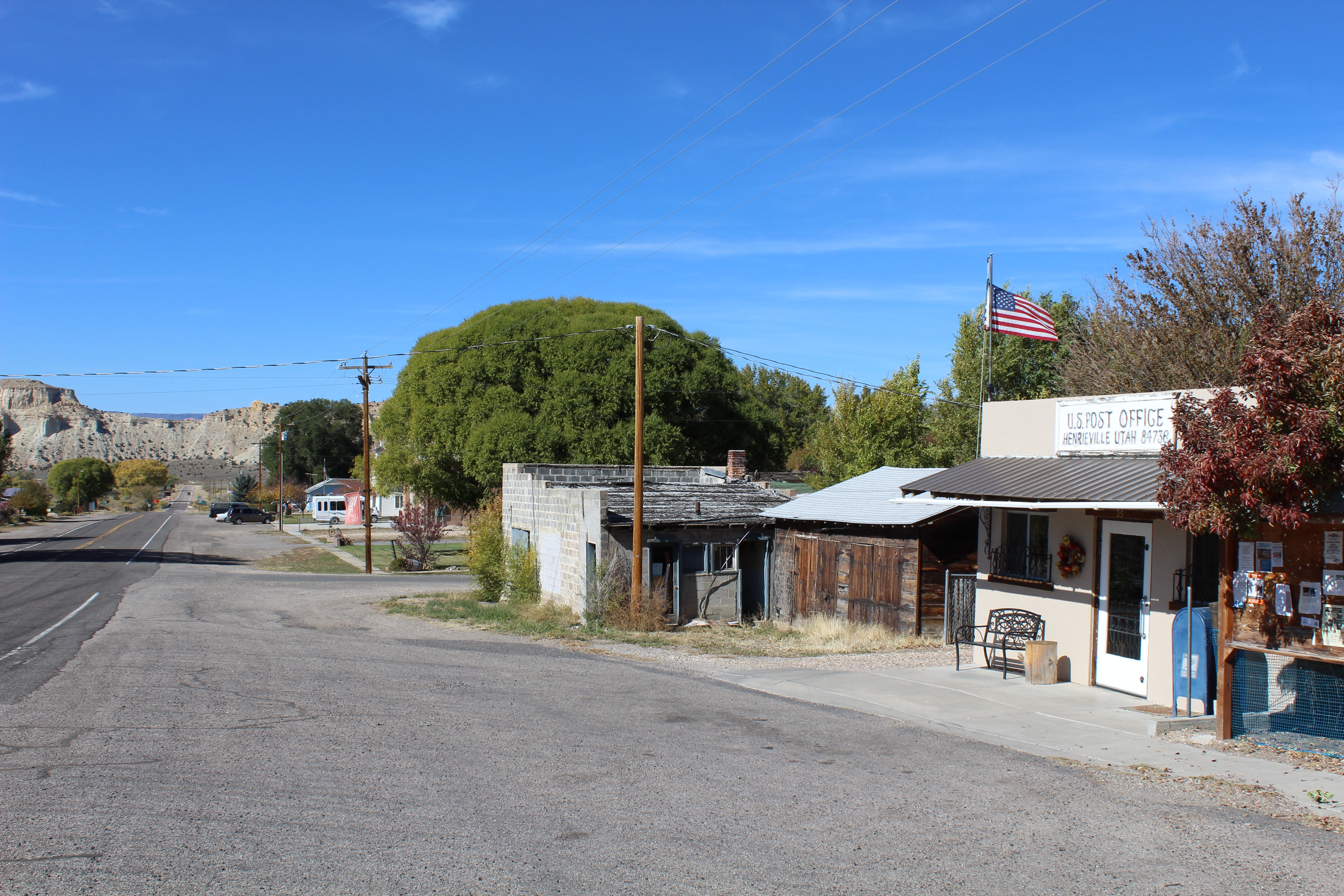
U.S. Post Office in Henrieville

The median income for a household in the town was $28,500, and the median income for a family was $35,000. Males had a median income of $21,667 versus $22,500 for females. The per capita income was $12,231. About 4.5% of families and 8.6% of the population were below the poverty line, including 10.2% of those under eighteen and 11.1% of those 65 or over.

== See also ==
- List of cities and towns in Utah

== See also ==
Media related to Henrieville, Utah at Wikimedia Commons
