= Utah State Route 12 =

State highway in Garfield and Wayne counties in Utah, United States

State Route 12
- A Journey Through Time Scenic Byway
- SR-12 highlighted in red

Route information
- Maintained by UDOT
- Length: 122.863 mi (197.729 km)
- Existed: 1914 as a state highway; 1920s as SR-12–present
- Tourist routes: Utah's Scenic Byway 12 - A Journey Through Time

Major junctions
- West end: US 89 near Panguitch
- SR-63 near Bryce Canyon; Hole in the Rock Road near Escalante
- East end: SR-24 near Torrey

Location
- Country: United States
- State: Utah
- Counties: Garfield, Wayne

Highway system
- Utah State Highway System; Interstate; US; State; Minor; Scenic
← SR-10	→ SR-13

State Route 12 or Scenic Byway 12 (SR-12), also known as "Highway 12 — A Journey Through Time Scenic Byway", is a 123-mile-long (198 km) state highway designated an All-American Road located in Garfield County and Wayne County, Utah, United States.

== Route description ==
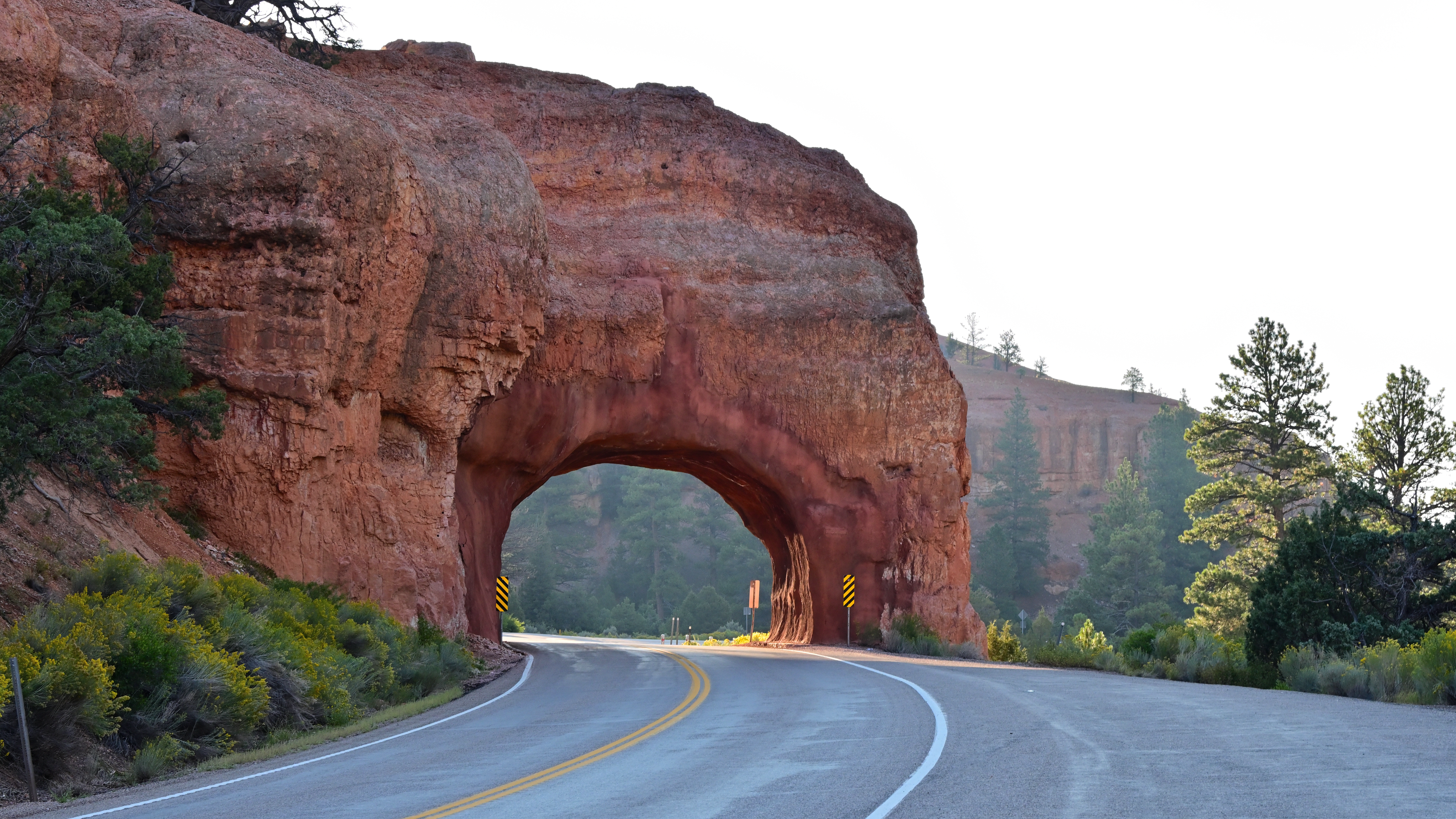
SR-12 through Red Canyon Arch tunnel

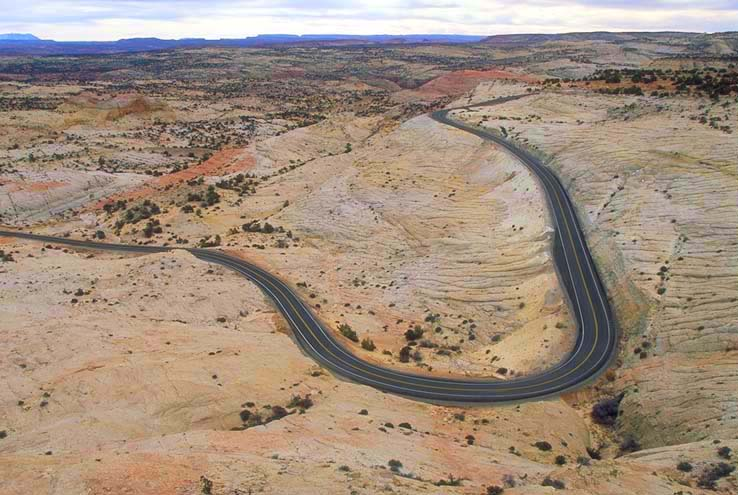
SR-12, as seen from the Head of the Rocks overlook

Proceeding west to east for 123 miles (nearly 200 km), the highway starts south of Panguitch at an intersection with US-89, crosses part of Dixie National Forest and Bryce Canyon National Park, continues through the small towns of Tropic, Cannonville, and Henrieville. It crosses various parts of Grand Staircase–Escalante National Monument (GS-ENM), continues northeast through Escalante and over the Escalante River, then over "The Hogback", a narrow ridge with no guardrails or shoulders and steep drop-offs on each side. It then proceeds north through more of GS-ENM, Boulder, the Aquarius Plateau, and Grover, ending in Torrey at an intersection with SR-24, five miles (8 km) west of Capitol Reef National Park. The 30-mile (48 km) long portion of the highway that ascends and descends Boulder Mountain on the Aquarius Plateau is known as Boulder Mountain Highway.

The segment of SR-12 between the US-89 and SR-63 junctions is part of the National Highway System.

=== Traffic volume ===
The Average Daily Traffic (AADT) on SR-12 is at its greatest at its western junction with US-89, where the count for 2005 was 2,430. At its other end, at the junction with SR-24, the traffic bottoms out at 435.

== History ==
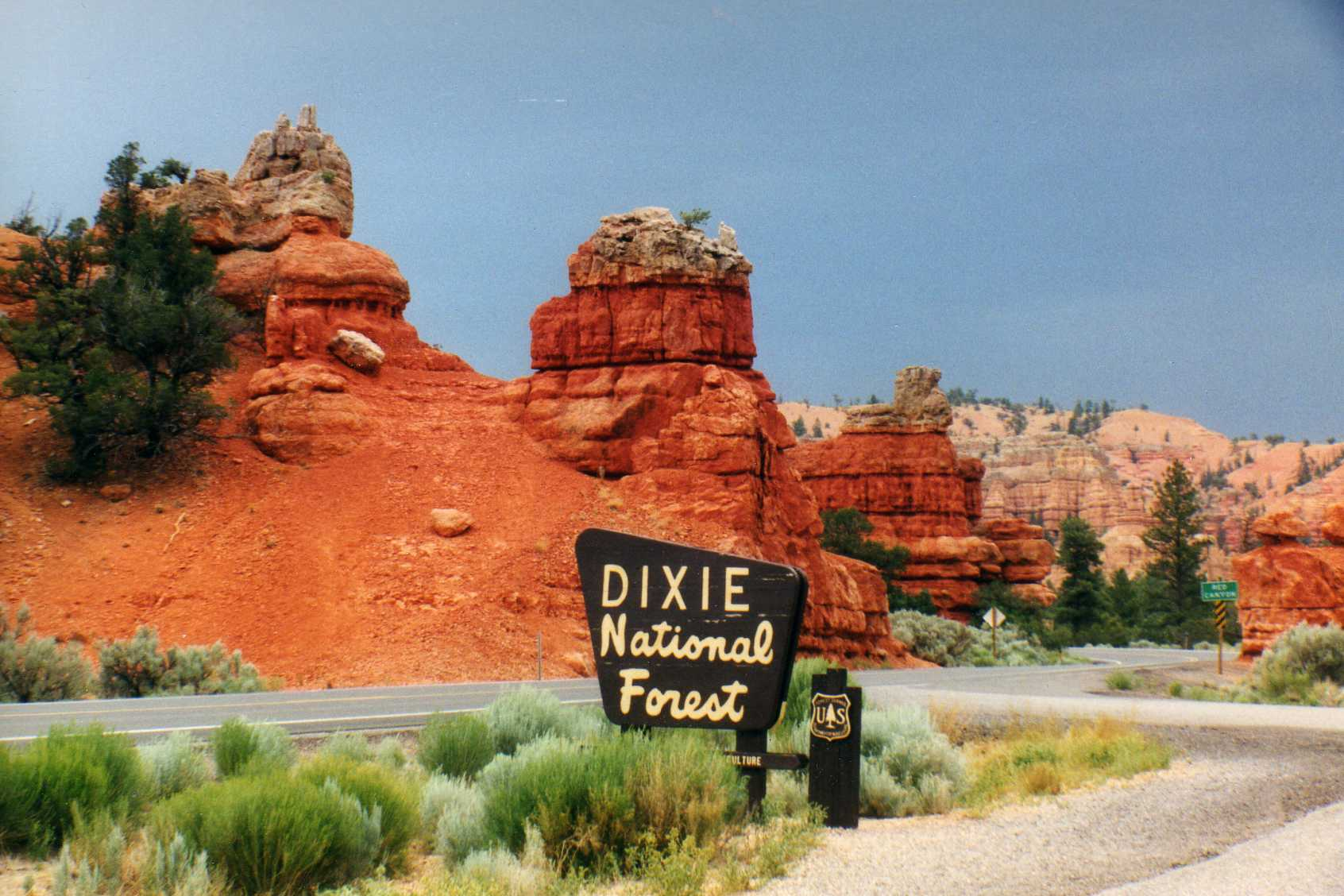
Red Canyon, Dixie National Forest

The road from Bryce Canyon Junction to Tropic was added to the state highway system in 1914. In 1923, a branch from Tropic Junction to Bryce Canyon was built as a forest road. The State Road Commission numbered the route to Bryce Canyon SR-12 in the 1920s, and in 1927 the state legislature assigned it to both branches, to Bryce Canyon and Tropic, but split off the branch to Tropic as State Route 54 in 1931. That same year, a new State Route 120 was created, continuing the road from Tropic to Henrieville, and in 1935 it became part of SR-54. Another road was also added to the state highway system in 1914, connecting SR-22 at Widtsoe with Escalante, and it was numbered State Route 23 in 1927. An extension took SR-23 northeast to Boulder in 1941, and in 1947 SR-54 absorbed SR-23, with the Widtsoe-Escalante road dropped in favor of Henrieville-Escalante. State Route 117, running southeast from SR-24 near Teasdale to Grover, became a state highway in 1931, and was extended south to Boulder in 1957, becoming part of SR-54 in 1966. In 1969, SR-54 became part of SR-12, but most of the former SR-117 was dropped, leaving SR-12 to stretch from Bryce Canyon Junction to the northern limit of Boulder (at the Dixie National Forest boundary), with a short spur to Bryce Canyon. This spur became a new SR-63 in 1975, and in 1985 the route was extended back north from Boulder to SR-24, using a different route than the old SR-117 north of Grover.

== Major intersections ==
County	Location	mi	km	Destinations	Notes
Garfield	Bryce Canyon Junction	0.000	0.000	US 89 – Panguitch, Kanab, Zion National Park	
Garfield		10.713	17.241	East Fork of the Sevier Scenic Backway	
Garfield	Tropic Junction	13.598	21.884	SR-63 / John's Valley Road – Bryce Canyon, Antimony	Former SR-22
Garfield	Cannonville	25.657	41.291	Cottonwood Canyon Scenic Backway – Kodachrome Basin State Park	
Garfield		54.643	87.939	Main Canyon Road	Former SR-23
Garfield	Escalante	58.968	94.900	Smokey Mountain Scenic Backway	
Garfield	Escalante	59.830	96.287	Posey Lake Scenic Backway	
Garfield		64.392	103.629	Hole-in-the-Rock Scenic Backway	
Garfield		83.270	134.010	Hell's Backbone Road	
Garfield	Boulder	86.352	138.970	Burr Trail Scenic Backway	
Wayne		118.179	190.191	Teasdale	Former SR-117
Wayne		122.863	197.729	SR-24 – Loa, Hanksville	
1.000 mi = 1.609 km; 1.000 km = 0.621 mi

== See also ==
- Paunsaugunt Plateau

== Gallery ==
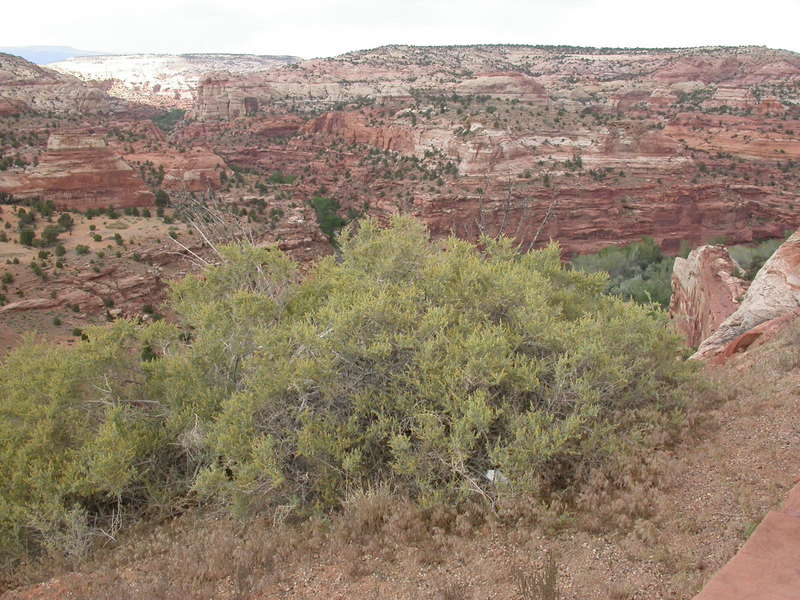
SR-12 goes north up the canyon in the upper left of the photo after crossing the Escalante River.

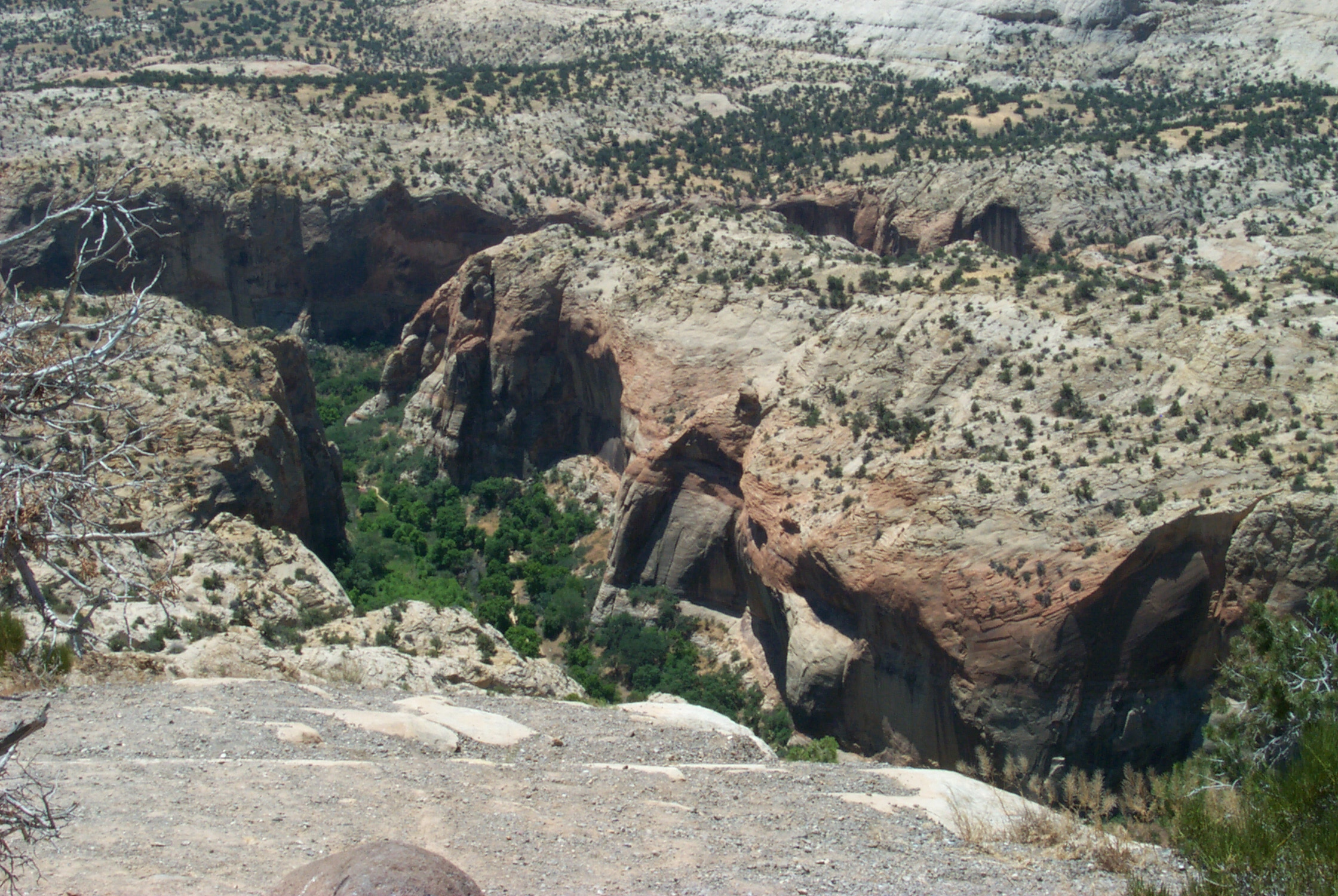
The canyons after the Escalante River.

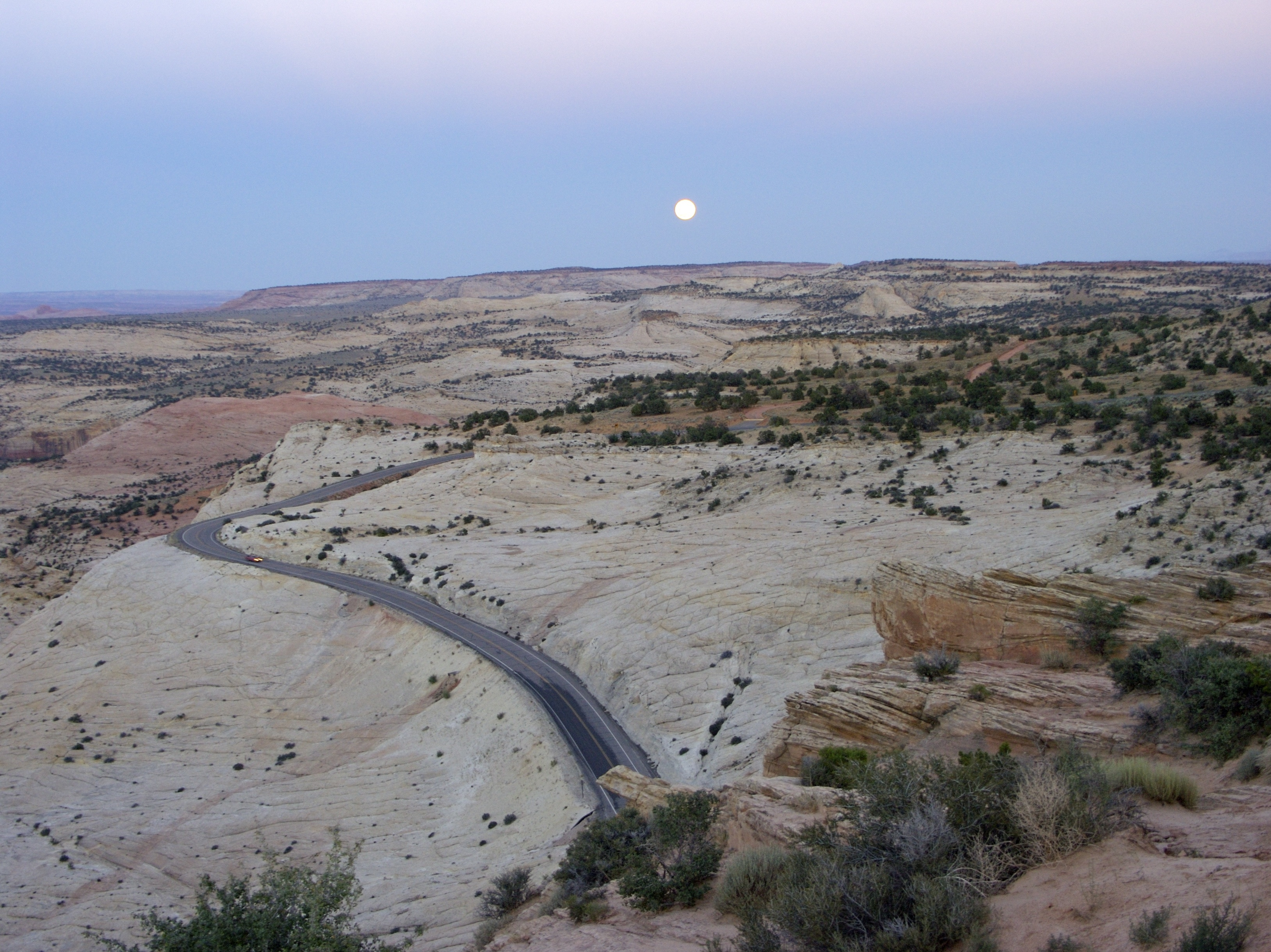
Moonrise over SR-12 in Grand Staircase–Escalante National Monument

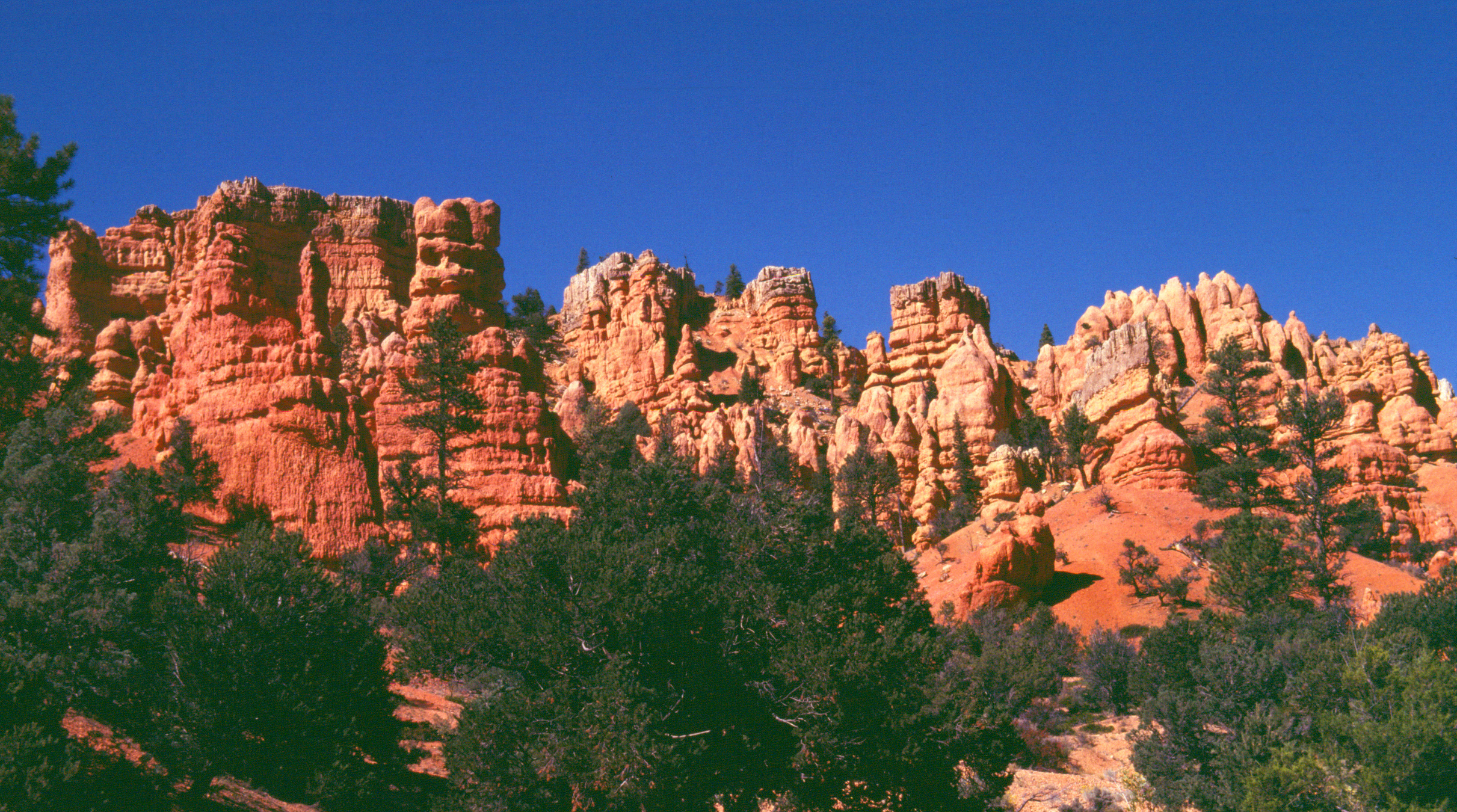
Red Canyon, in Utah's Dixie National Forest, is near the western end of Route 12.

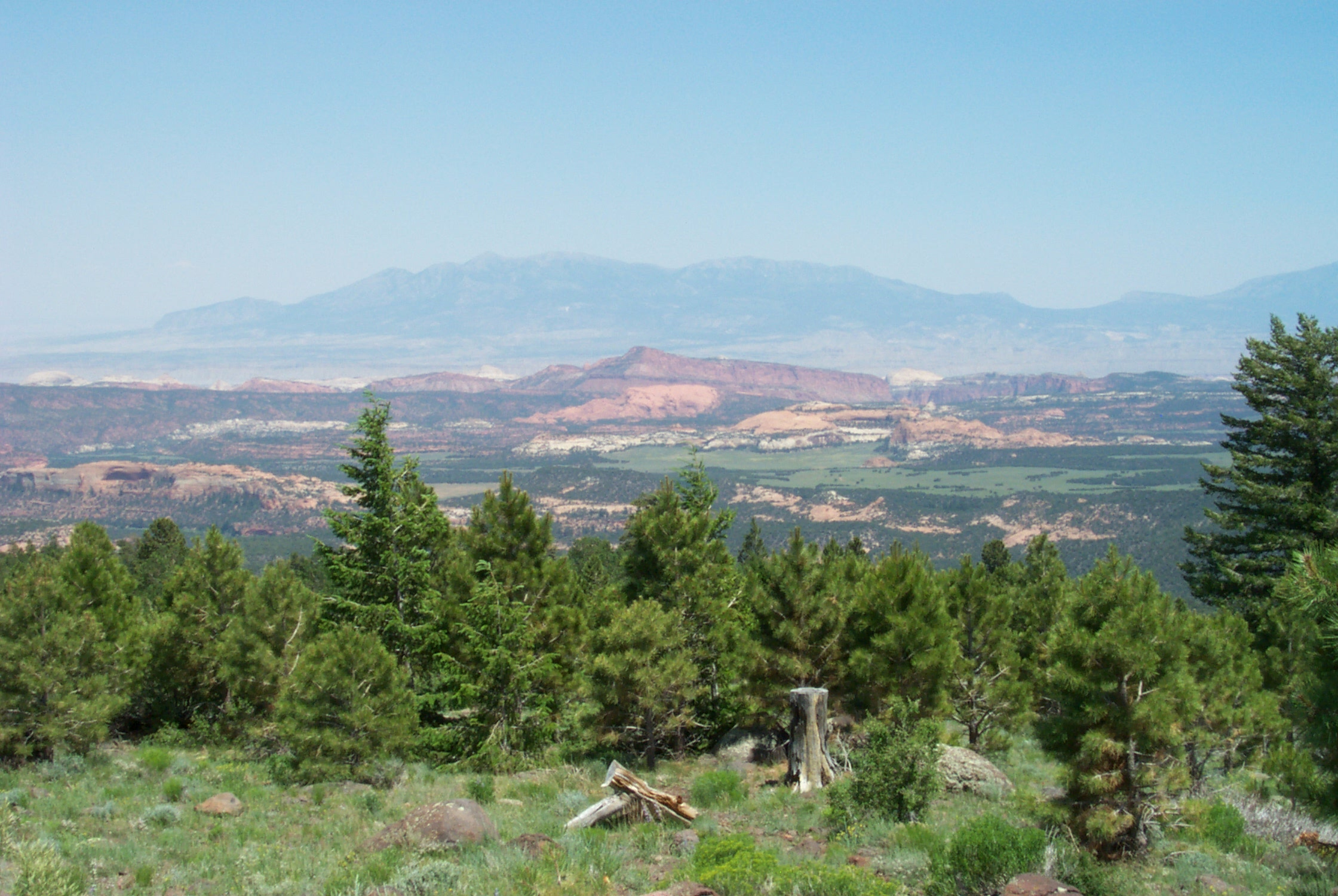
An overlook from the eastern portion of Highway 12.

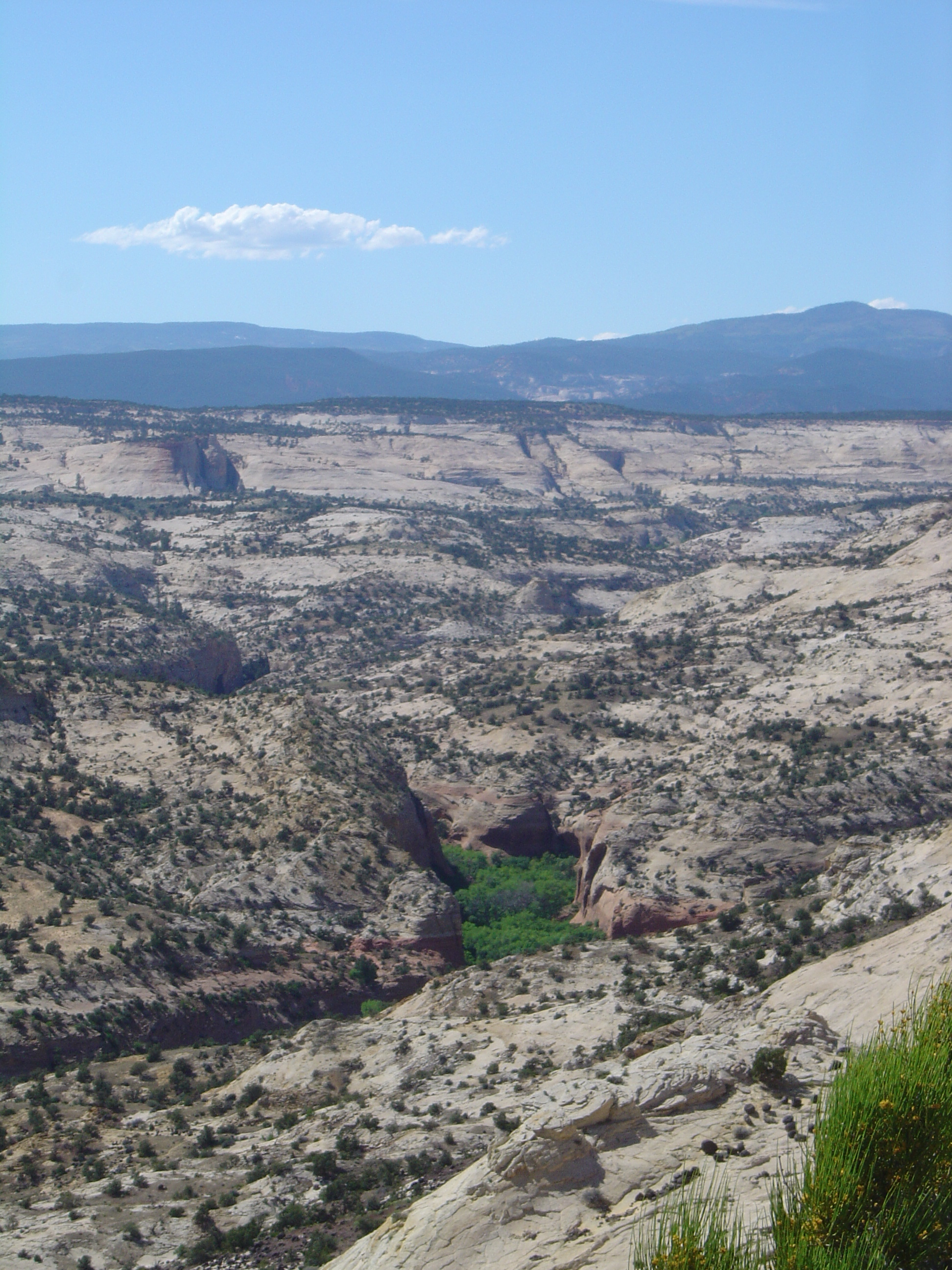
Calf Creek Canyon runs near Route 12.

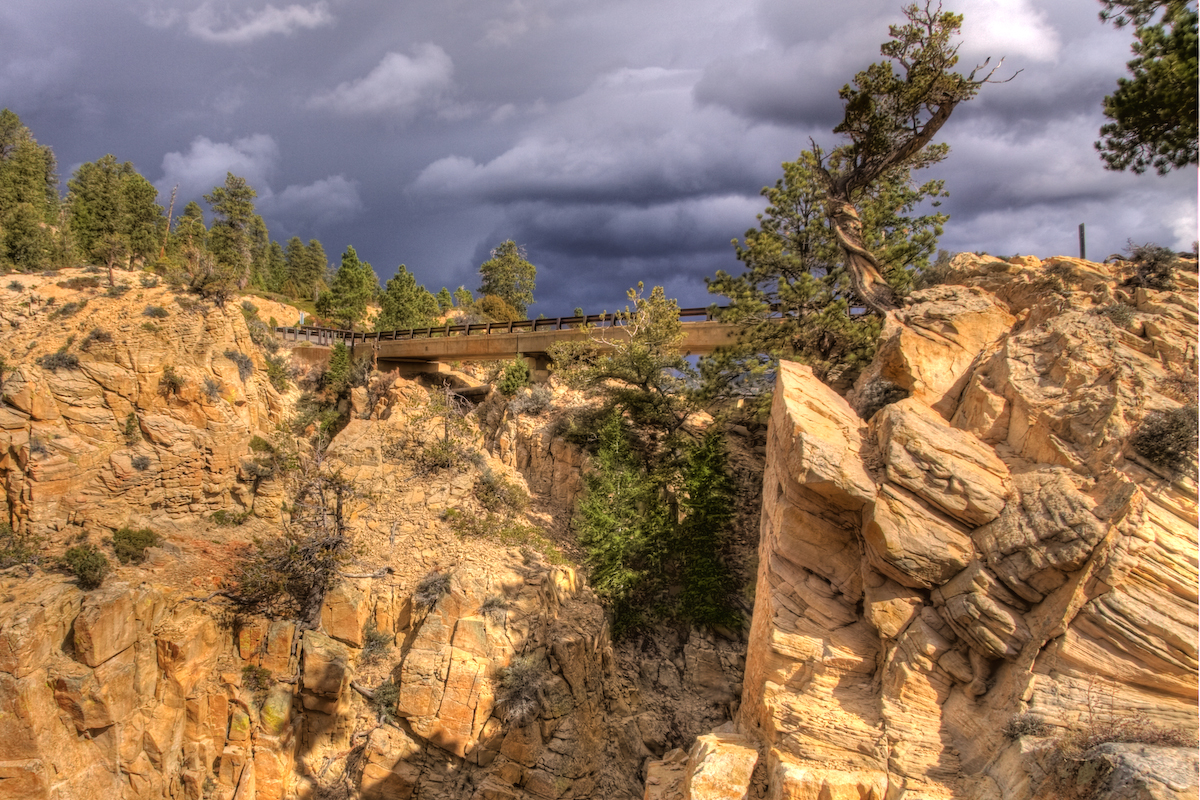
The bridge on Hell's Backbone Road.

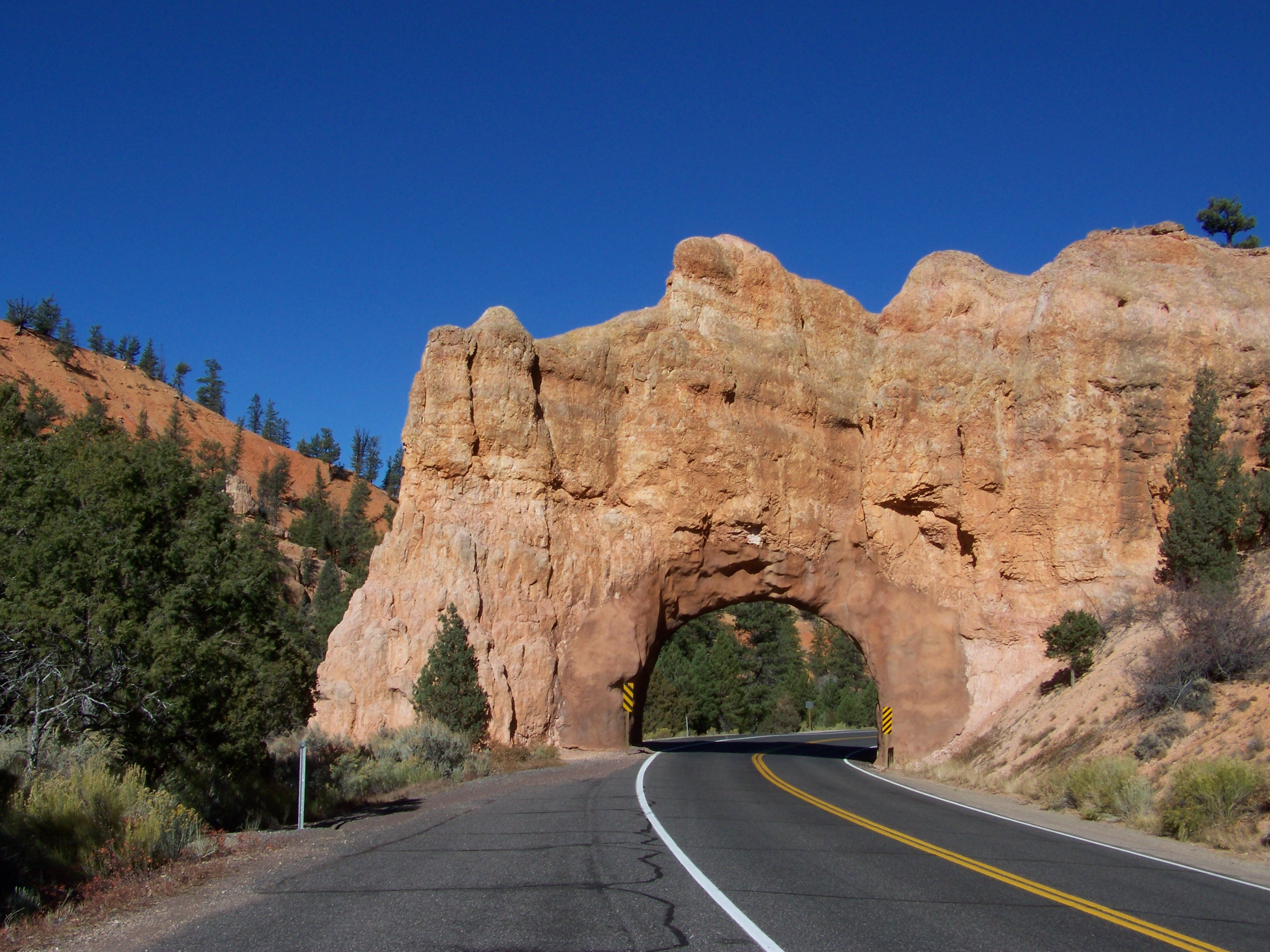
Red Canyon Scenic Drive.

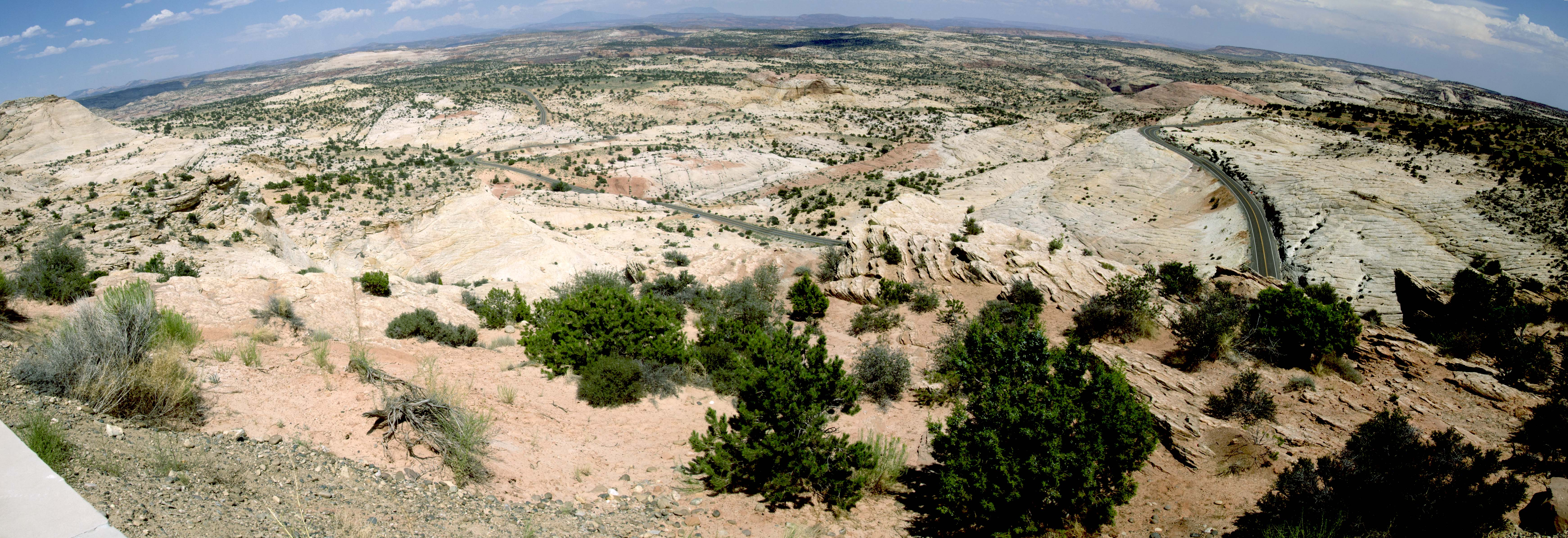
State Route 12 in Utah - Panorama looking north and east from Head of the Rocks Overlook.
