= Cannonville, Utah =

- Town
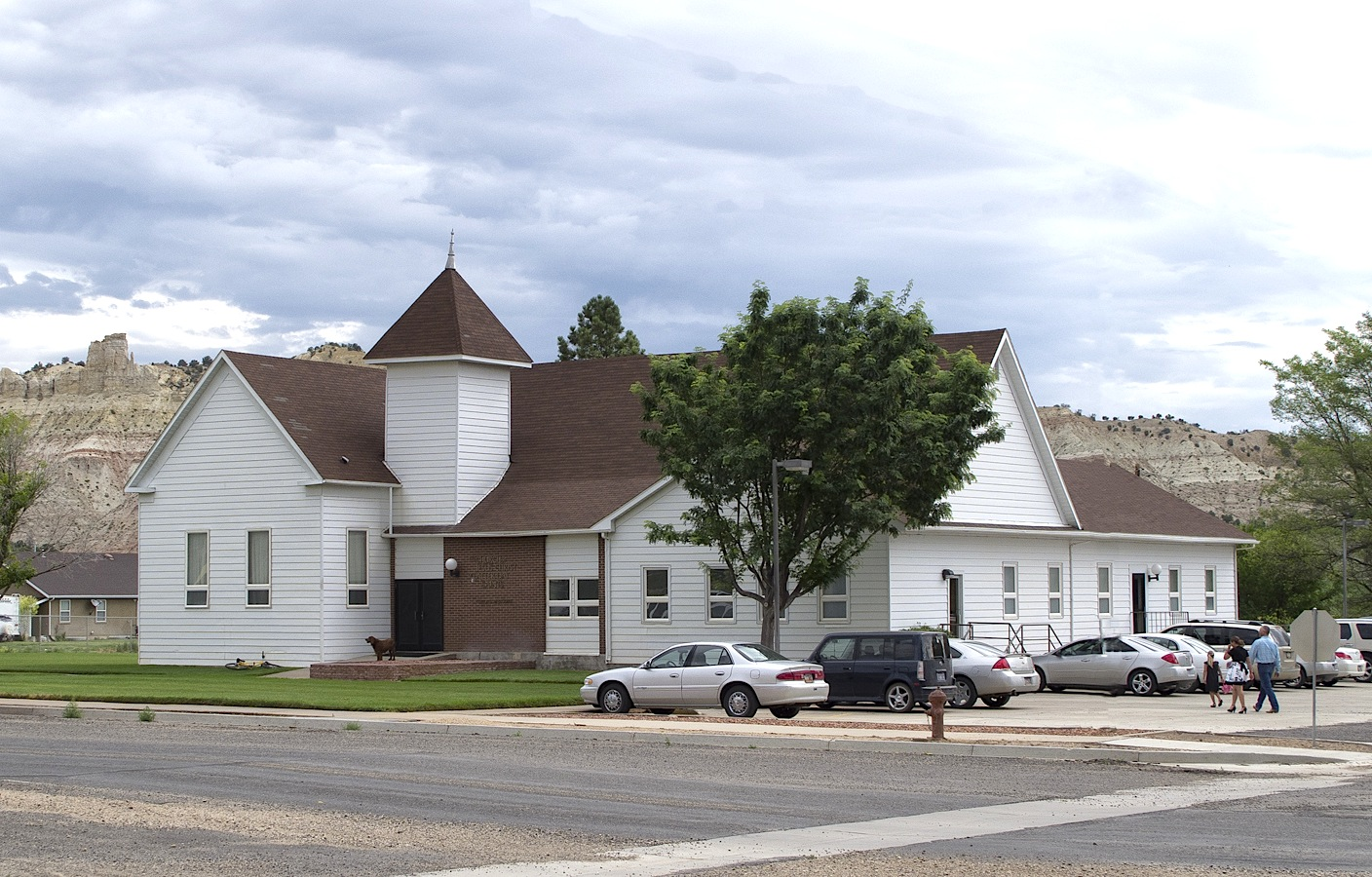
- Church of Jesus Christ of Latter-Day Saints meetinghouse in Cannonville
- Nicknames: Shotgun (Before a new family moved in, then they called it Cannonville)
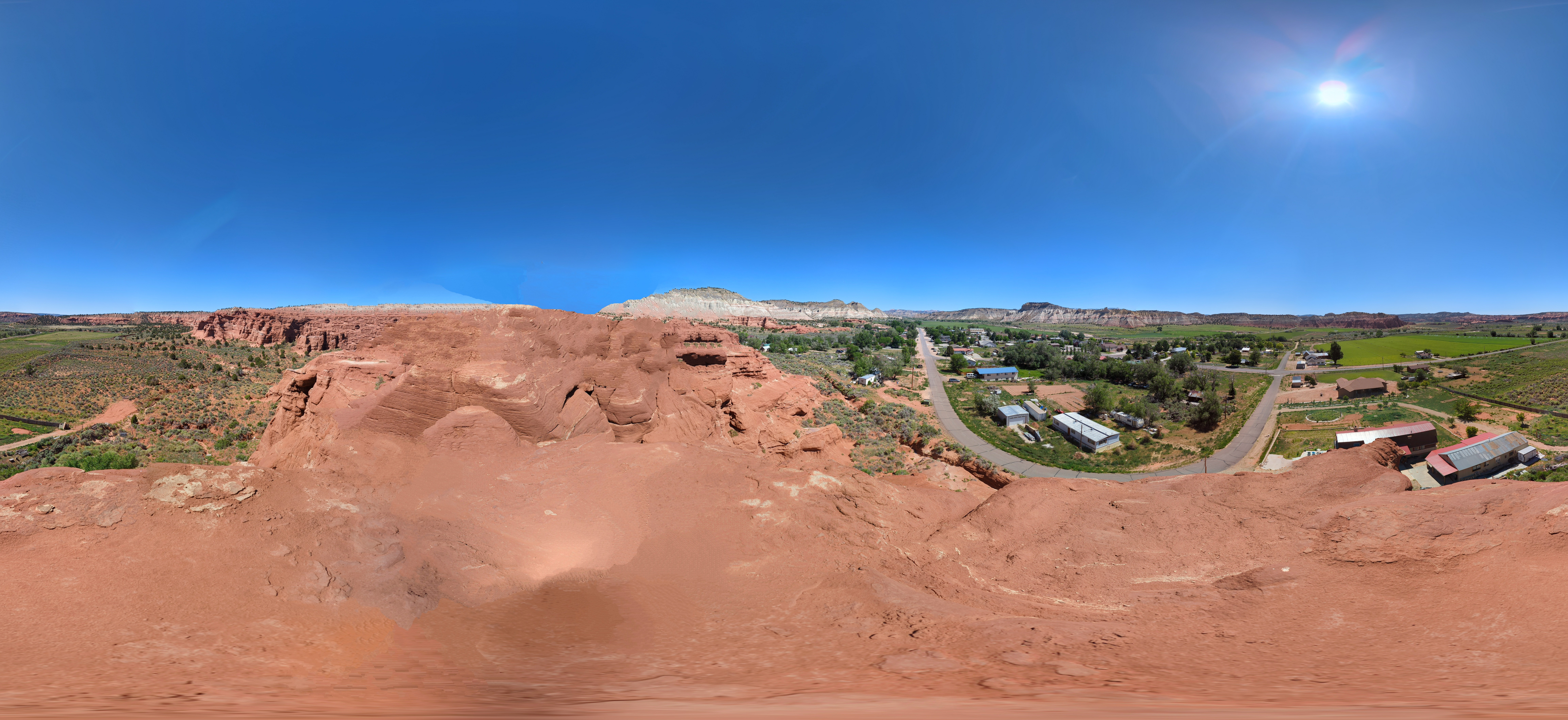
- Motto: 360 degree view of Cannonville, UT from the Big Red Rock which is on the Southwest side of Cannonville.

- Location in Garfield County and state of Utah
- Coordinates: 37°34′0″N 112°3′6″W
- Country: United States
- State: Utah
- County: Garfield
- Founded: 1874
- Incorporated: 1934
- Founder: James L. Thompson
- Named for: George Q. Cannon

Government
  - Mayor: Bill Scoffield
  - Clerk: Machelle Nelson

Area
  - Total: 2.57 sq mi (6.65 km^{2})
  - Land: 2.57 sq mi (6.65 km^{2})
  - Water: 0 sq mi (0.00 km^{2})
- Elevation: 5,886 ft (1,794 m)

Population (2020)
  - Total: 186
  - Estimate (2019): 173
  - Density: 67.4/sq mi (26.03/km^{2})
- Time zone: UTC-7 (Mountain (MST))
  - Summer (DST): UTC-6 (MDT)
- ZIP code: 84718
- Area code: 435
- FIPS code: 49-10330
- GNIS feature ID: 1426344
- Website: cannonville.gov

Cannonville is a town in Garfield County, Utah, United States, along Utah Scenic Byway 12. As of the 2020 census, the population was 186.

== History ==
Cannonville was laid out in 1874. A post office called Cannonville was established in 1879, and remained in operation until 1966. The community bears the name of George Q. Cannon, a Mormon official.

== Geography ==
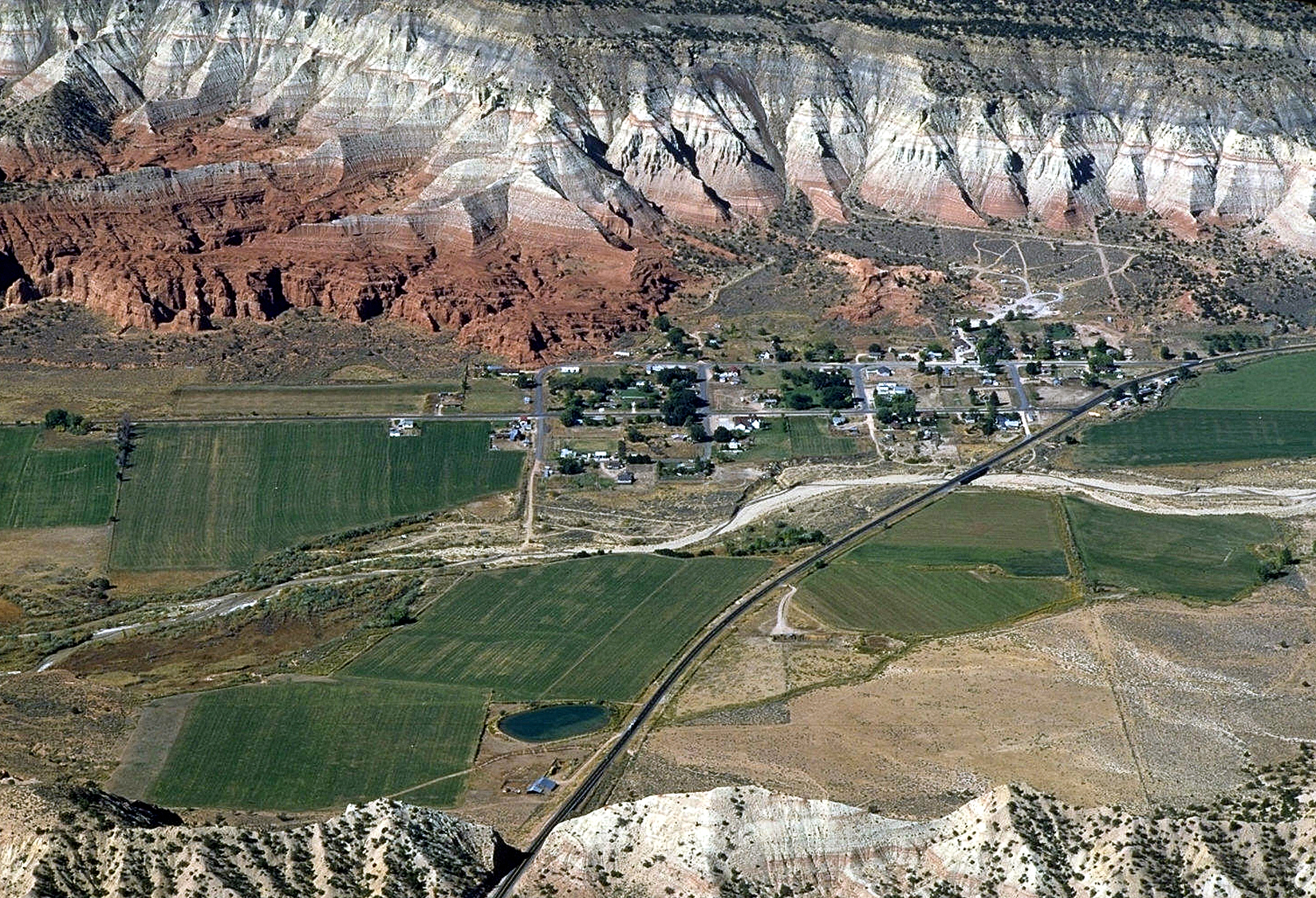
Aerial view of Cannonville, 2004

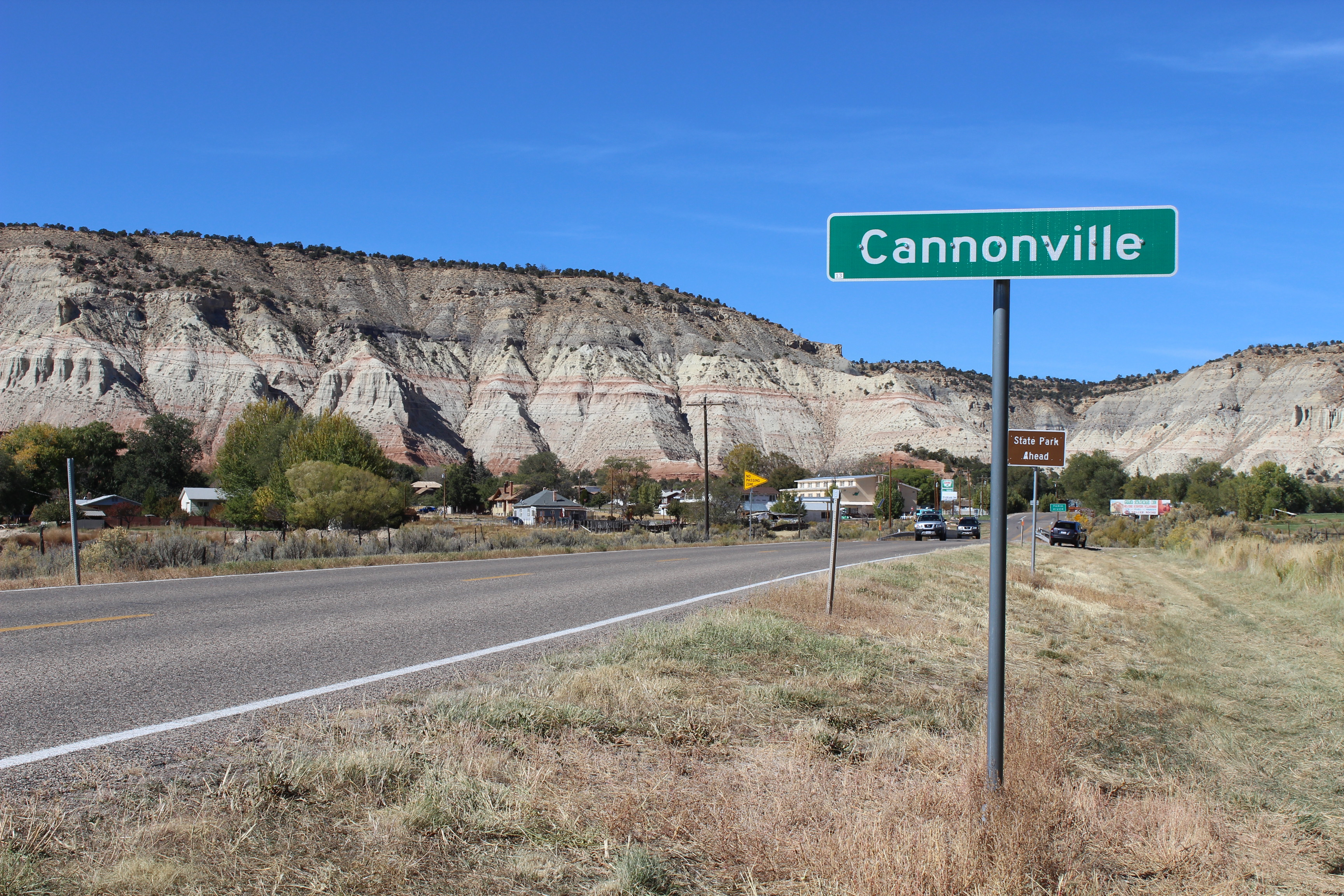
Looking northwest along Highway 12

Cannonville is located near the southern border of Garfield County, in the valley of the Paria River. Via State Route 12 it is 3.5 miles (5.6 km) east to Henrieville and 5 miles (8 km) north to Tropic. Bryce Canyon National Park is 6 miles (10 km) in a straight line to the west, 16 miles (26 km) by road.

According to the United States Census Bureau, the town has a total area of 2.0 square miles (5.1 km^{2}), all land.

=== Climate ===
The climate in this area features a large daily and annual temperature range, with cold, dry winters and hot summers. Rainfall is highly seasonal, with most precipitation falling during the late-summer monsoon season and average annual precipitation of nine inches. According to the Köppen Climate Classification system, Cannonville has a hot and cold arid desert climate, abbreviated "BWk" on climate maps.

Climate data for Cannonville, Utah
Month	Jan	Feb	Mar	Apr	May	Jun	Jul	Aug	Sep	Oct	Nov	Dec	Year
Mean daily maximum °F (°C)	32 (0)	36 (2)	43 (6)	52 (11)	63 (17)	75 (24)	81 (27)	77 (25)	72 (22)	57 (14)	46 (8)	34 (1)	56 (13)
Mean daily minimum °F (°C)	14 (−10)	16 (−9)	25 (−4)	32 (0)	41 (5)	50 (10)	57 (14)	55 (13)	50 (10)	37 (3)	27 (−3)	16 (−9)	35 (2)
Average precipitation inches (mm)	0.8 (21)	1.0 (25)	1.0 (26)	0.7 (18)	0.9 (22)	0.6 (16)	1.1 (27)	1.7 (42)	1.4 (36)	1.1 (27)	0.9 (23)	0.9 (23)	12.1 (306)
Average snowfall inches (cm)	7.8 (19.9)	7.2 (18.3)	6.7 (17.1)	1.9 (4.9)	0.2 (0.5)	0 (0)	0 (0)	0 (0)	0 (0)	0.5 (1.2)	4.0 (10.1)	8.5 (21.5)	36.8 (93.5)
Average extreme snow depth inches (cm)	6.7 (17)	7.9 (20)	5.9 (15)	2.0 (5)	0 (0)	0 (0)	0 (0)	0 (0)	0 (0)	0 (0)	0.8 (2)	2.8 (7)	7.9 (20)
Average precipitation days	6	7	7	5	5	3	7	8	5	4	5	6	68
Average relative humidity (%)	71.5	69.3	62	53.5	45.9	36.2	43.9	50.1	48.9	57.1	63.9	70.1	56.0
Mean daily daylight hours	10.4	11.3	12.4	13.7	14.7	15.3	15	14	12.8	11.6	10.6	10.1	12.7
Source: Weatherbase World Weather online(Temperatures-Snowfall 2009-2023)

== Demographics ==
Historical population
Census	Pop.	Note	%±
1880	137		—
1890	273		99.3%
1900	211		−22.7%
1910	219		3.8%
1920	311		42.0%
1930	227		−27.0%
1940	250		10.1%
1950	205		−18.0%
1960	153		−25.4%
1970	113		−26.1%
1980	134		18.6%
1990	131		−2.2%
2000	148		13.0%
2010	167		12.8%
2020	186		11.4%
U.S. Decennial Census

As of the census of 2000, there were 148 people, 50 households, and 41 families residing in the town. The population density was 119.9 people per square mile (46.5/km^{2}). There were 60 housing units at an average density of 48.6 per square mile (18.8/km^{2}). The racial makeup of the town was 95.27% White, 0.68% Pacific Islander, 3.38% from other races, and 0.68% from two or more races. Hispanic or Latino of any race were 4.05% of the population.

There were 50 households, of which 42.0% had children under 18 living with them, 66.0% were married couples living together, 14.0% had a female householder with no husband present, and 18.0% were non-families. 18.0% of all households were made up of individuals, and 16.0% had someone living alone who was 65 years of age or older. The average household size was 2.96, and the average family size was 3.34.

In the town, the population was spread out, with 33.8% under 18, 6.8% from 18 to 24, 19.6% from 25 to 44, 20.3% from 45 to 64, and 19.6% who were 65 years of age or older. The median age was 38 years. For every 100 females, there were 117.6 males. For every 100 females aged 18 and over, there were 96.0 males.

The median income for a household in the town was $28,750, and the median income for a family was $32,250. Males had a median income of $23,750 versus $12,083 for females. The per capita income was $11,481. None of the families and 3.7% of the population lived below the poverty line, including no under eighteens and 10.9% of those over 64.

== See also ==
- List of towns in Utah
