= Torrey, Utah =

Town in the state of Utah, United States

- Town
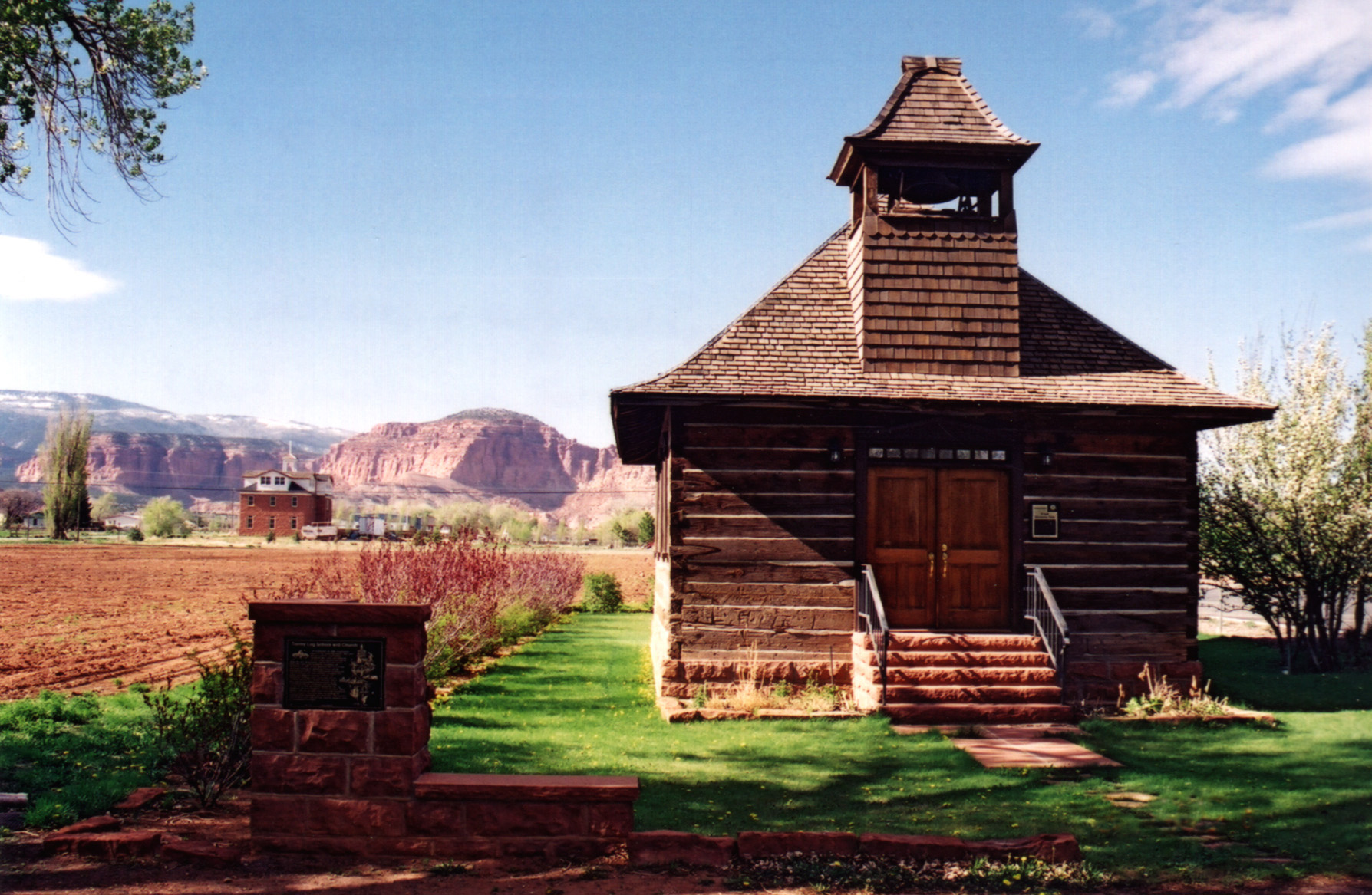
- A Utah historic site, this old log schoolhouse with its bell tower and red sandstone steps is a reminder of Torrey's pioneer heritage.

- Location in Wayne County and the state of Utah.
- Coordinates: 38°17′56″N 111°25′09″W
- Country: United States
- State: Utah
- County: Wayne
- Incorporated: 1934
- Named for: Jay Torrey

Area
  - Total: 1.66 sq mi (4.31 km^{2})
  - Land: 1.66 sq mi (4.31 km^{2})
  - Water: 0 sq mi (0.00 km^{2})
- Elevation: 6,837 ft (2,084 m)

Population (2020)
  - Total: 231
  - Density: 146.6/sq mi (56.61/km^{2})
- Time zone: UTC-7 (Mountain (MST))
  - Summer (DST): UTC-6 (MDT)
- ZIP code: 84775
- Area code: 435
- FIPS code: 49-77010
- Website: www.torreyutah.gov

Torrey is a town located on State Route 24 in Wayne County, Utah, United States, 8 miles (13 km) from Capitol Reef National Park. As of the 2020 census, the town had a population of 231.

== History ==
The town was established in the 1880s by settlers of the Church of Jesus Christ of Latter-day Saints, and was initially known as Youngtown, after John Willard Young. The town is generally held to be named after Jay L. Torrey from Pittsfield, Illinois. Torrey was a member of the Wyoming legislature, who, upon the advent of the Spanish–American War, achieved national attention by proposing the creation of what became three volunteer cavalry regiments, made up of cowboys and stockmen. Torrey was commissioned colonel of the 2nd Regiment, the "Rocky Mountain Riders".

== Geography ==
Torrey is located on the north bank of the Fremont River between Boulder Mountain to the southwest and Capitol Reef National Park to the east. Teasdale is approximately three miles to the southwest, Grover is about five miles to the southeast and Bicknell is about 6 mi (10 km) to the northwest. Utah State Route 24 and Utah State Route 12 serve the community.

According to the United States Census Bureau, the town has a total area of 0.50 square miles (1.3 km^{2}), all land.

== Demographics ==
Historical population
| Census | Pop. | Note | %± |
|---|---|---|---|
| 1910 | 142 | | — |
| 1920 | 252 | | 77.5% |
| 1930 | 274 | | 8.7% |
| 1940 | 241 | | −12.0% |
| 1950 | 241 | | 0.0% |
| 1960 | 128 | | −46.9% |
| 1970 | 84 | | −34.4% |
| 1980 | 140 | | 66.7% |
| 1990 | 122 | | −12.9% |
| 2000 | 171 | | 40.2% |
| 2010 | 182 | | 6.4% |
| 2020 | 231 | | 26.9% |
U.S. Decennial Census

As of the census of 2000, there were 171 people, 73 households, and 50 families residing in the town. The population density was 433.3 people per square mile (169.3/km^{2}). There were 110 housing units at an average density of 278.7 per square mile (108.9/km^{2}). The racial makeup of the town was 99.42% White and 0.58% from two or more races. Hispanic or Latino of any race were 2.34% of the population.

There were 73 households, out of which 23.3% had children under the age of 18 living with them, 56.2% were married couples living together, 6.8% had a female householder with no husband present, and 31.5% were non-families. 26.0% of all households were made up of individuals, and 11.0% had someone living alone who was 65 years of age or older. The average household size was 2.34 and the average family size was 2.76.

In the town, the population was spread out, with 21.6% under the age of 18, 7.0% from 18 to 24, 24.6% from 25 to 44, 24.0% from 45 to 64, and 22.8% who were 65 years of age or older. The median age was 43 years. For every 100 females, there were 92.1 males. For every 100 females age 18 and over, there were 100.0 males.

The median income for a household in the town was $25,859, and the median income for a family was $26,528. Males had a median income of $26,250 versus $16,667 for females. The per capita income for the town was $15,818. About 5.9% of families and 6.7% of the population were below the poverty line, including none of those under age 18 and 20.7% of those 65 and older.

== See also ==
- Capitol Reef National Park
