= Hillsdale, Utah =

Ghost town in Utah

Coordinates: 37°43′09″N 112°22′56″W

Hillsdale is a populated place in Garfield County, in the U.S. state of Utah.

== History ==
The first settlement at Hillsdale was made in 1871. A post office called Hillsdale was established in 1872, and remained in operation until 1886. Some sources state the community was named for the hills near the town site, while others say it was named after one of the original settlers, Joel Hills Johnson. Johnson and his brother-in-law, George Deliverance Wilson, established a sawmill in the area and were later joined by their own families and others. By 1872, the settlement grew to about 30 families. By 1886, irrigation water shortages contributed to population decline, and eventually only the Wilson family remained. In 1969, an observer noted that several of the original structures still stood, including a small cemetery, a schoolhouse, and five or six pioneer cabins. Hillsdale is considered a ghost town.
