= Hell's Backbone Road =

Hell's Backbone (Utah)

Hell's Backbone Road is a 38-mile (61 km) gravel road that was built by the Civilian Conservation Corps in the 1930s, and connects the towns of Boulder, Utah and Escalante, Utah. Halfway along the road is Hell's Backbone Bridge, which is 109 feet (33 m) long, and 14 feet (4.3 m) wide. A 1,500-foot (460 m) drop is on either side. Near the bridge are views of the Box-Death Hollow Wilderness. From late spring to autumn, the road, which climbs to more than 9,000 feet (2,750 m) elevation, is passable by ordinary passenger vehicles, but it is very narrow and winding.

Hell's Backbone Road is a high-country alternative to the paved Utah Scenic Byway 12, which also connects Boulder and Escalante, 27 road miles (44 km) apart.

== Images ==
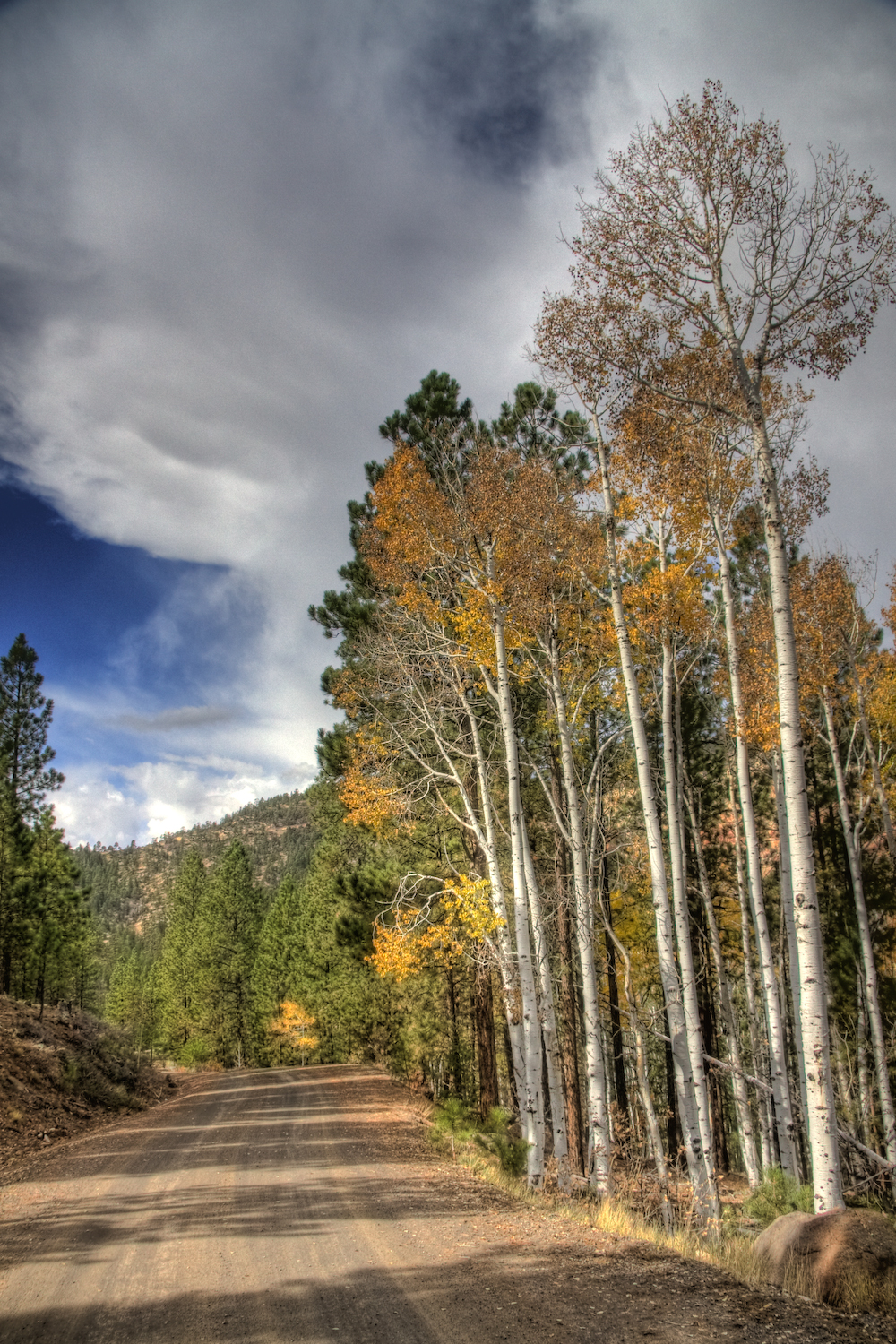
Fall Colors along Hell's Backbone Road

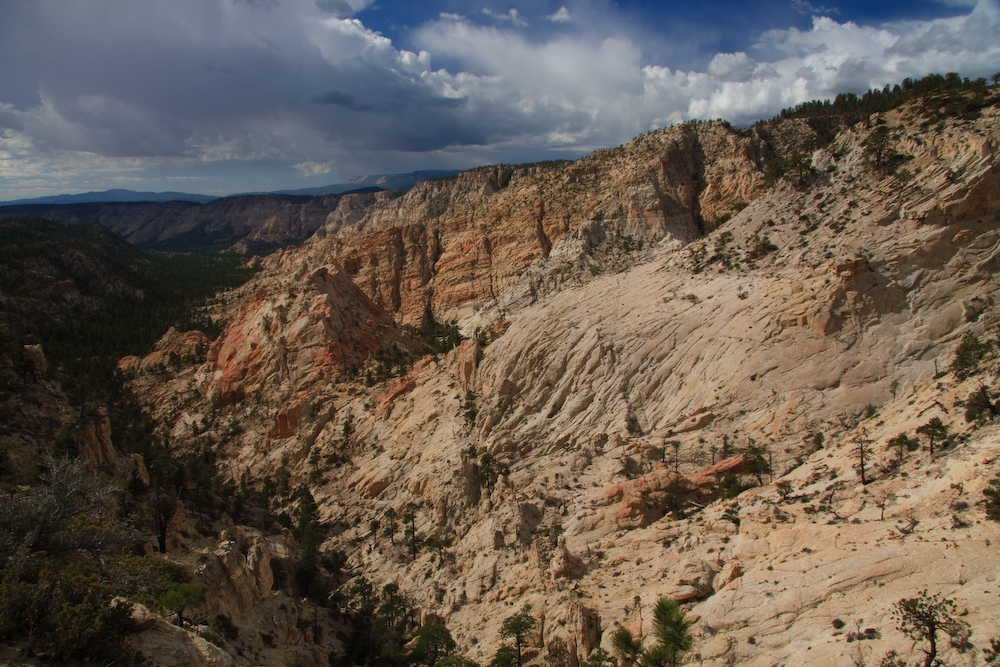
The view from the bridge looking south into the Box-Death Hollow Wilderness.

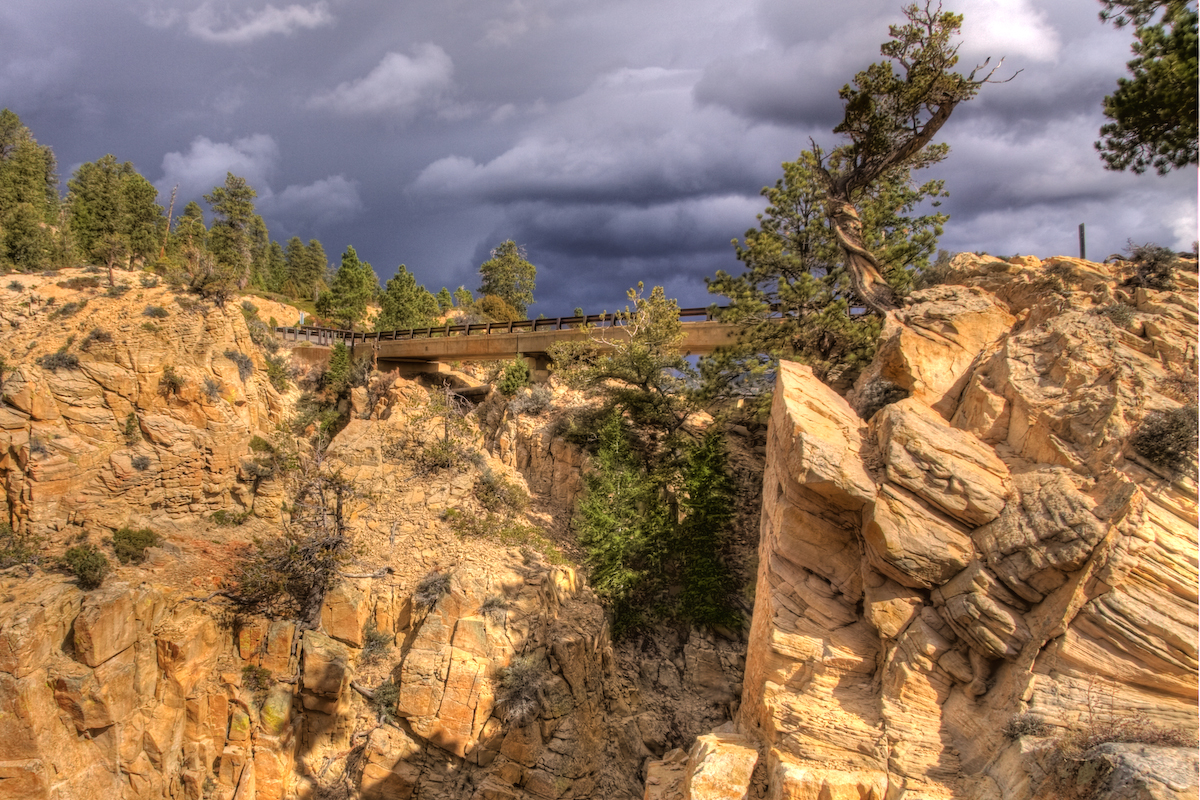
The Hell's Backbone Bridge at 37°58′13.08″N 111°35′56.40″W
