= Grover, Utah =

Unincorporated community in the state of Utah, United States

- Unincorporated community
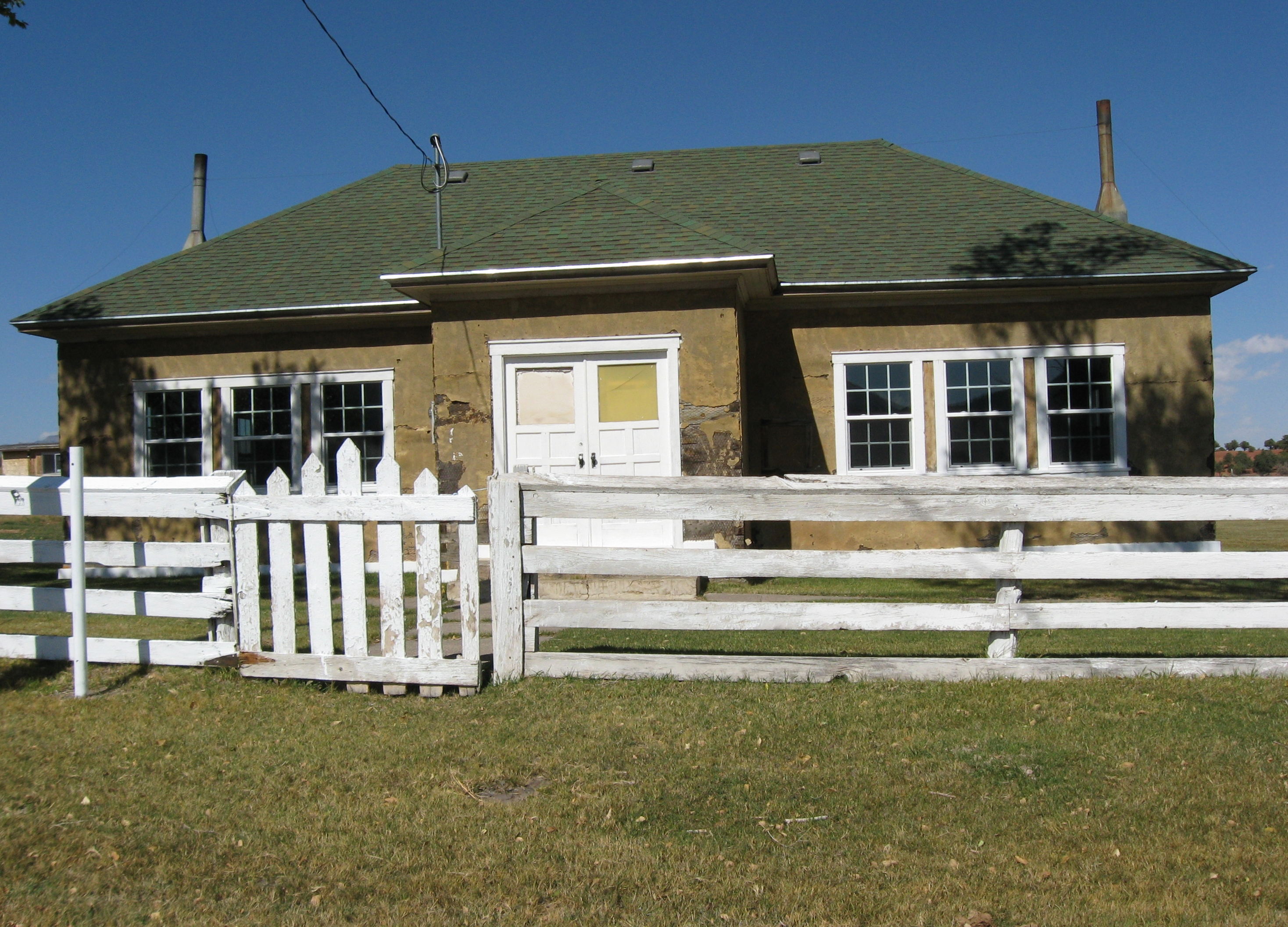
- The old Grover School, October 2008

- Location within Utah Location within the United States
- Coordinates: 38°13′41″N 111°21′00″W
- Country: United States
- State: Utah
- County: Wayne
- Settled: 1880
- Named for: Grover Cleveland
- Elevation: 7,116 ft (2,169 m)
- Time zone: UTC-7 (Mountain (MST))
  - Summer (DST): UTC-6 (MDT)
- ZIP code: 84773
- Area code: 435
- GNIS feature ID: 1437575

Grover is an unincorporated community in southwestern Wayne County, Utah, United States. Originally known as Carcass Creek, Grover is a small ranching community off the county's main recreational corridor.

== Geography ==
Grover lies some 7 miles (11 km) southeast of Torrey, on State Route 12. It sits just outside Dixie National Forest, at the northeastern flank of Boulder Mountain. To the east is Capitol Reef National Park. The community is small and scattered, but roughly bounded by two small streams, tributaries of the Fremont River. Fish Creek is on the west, Carcass Creek on the east. Carcass Creek was so named due to its steep banks, which proved hazardous to livestock. The former State Route 117 runs west and north from Grover to Teasdale, another small unincorporated community whose post office serves Grover.

== History ==
The first settlers on Carcass Creek were experienced Wayne County ranchers who arrived in 1880. In 1881, more cattlemen settled along Fish Creek. A small number of residents scattered through the area over the next few years. These early settlers referred to their settlement as Carcass Creek. In 1887, the Mormon residents were organized into a congregation called the Carcass Creek Branch, although meetings were held only irregularly due to the distances among homes.

In the early 1890s the growing town was granted a post office, and the name was changed to Grover in honor of U.S. President Grover Cleveland. The Grover Irrigation Company organized in 1893 to build and manage structures for drawing and distributing water from Fish Creek Lake. The first school classes were held in the winter of 1892–1893, and the first log school/church/community building was built about 1900.

In 1935, a new school building was built in Grover. A stuccoed log one-room school, the Grover School was built with funds and labor provided mainly by the Works Progress Administration. Unlike other area schools, it had a fence and lawn. Due to Grover's small size, the school board quickly decided the school was an unnecessary expense; within three years the older children were sent to school in Bicknell, and in 1941 the Grover School was closed. The building has remained largely intact, and in 1986 it was listed on the National Register of Historic Places.

== Demographics ==
Historical population
| Census | Pop. | Note | %± |
|---|---|---|---|
| 1900 | 85 | | — |
| 1910 | 73 | | −14.1% |
| 1920 | 52 | | −28.8% |
| 1930 | 73 | | 40.4% |
| 1940 | 92 | | 26.0% |
| 1950 | 53 | | −42.4% |
Source: U.S. Census Bureau

Even for sparsely populated Wayne County, Grover has always been a small community with few inhabitants. Through all the years that it was enumerated as a census precinct in the United States Census, from 1900 to 1950, the population never reached 100. The annual Fourth of July celebration in Grover has become a reunion of current and former residents; in 1973 the number of attendees was "more than 200".

== Economy ==
Like much of Wayne County, Grover's economy traditionally depended on ranching, but has been supplemented in recent decades by the tourist trade from Capitol Reef National Park and other regional recreation. The scenic location has become an attractive place for vacation homes. The Hale Family Theatre, one of several theater companies run by the family of Ruth Hale, produces plays through the summer months in a rustic barn theater at the family's Grover ranch.

== Education ==
Since the closure of the Grover School in 1941, Grover has had no schools of its own. Children attend school in Bicknell and Loa.
