= Bryce Canyon City, Utah =

Town in Garfield County, Utah, United States

Bryce Canyon City Bryce
- Town
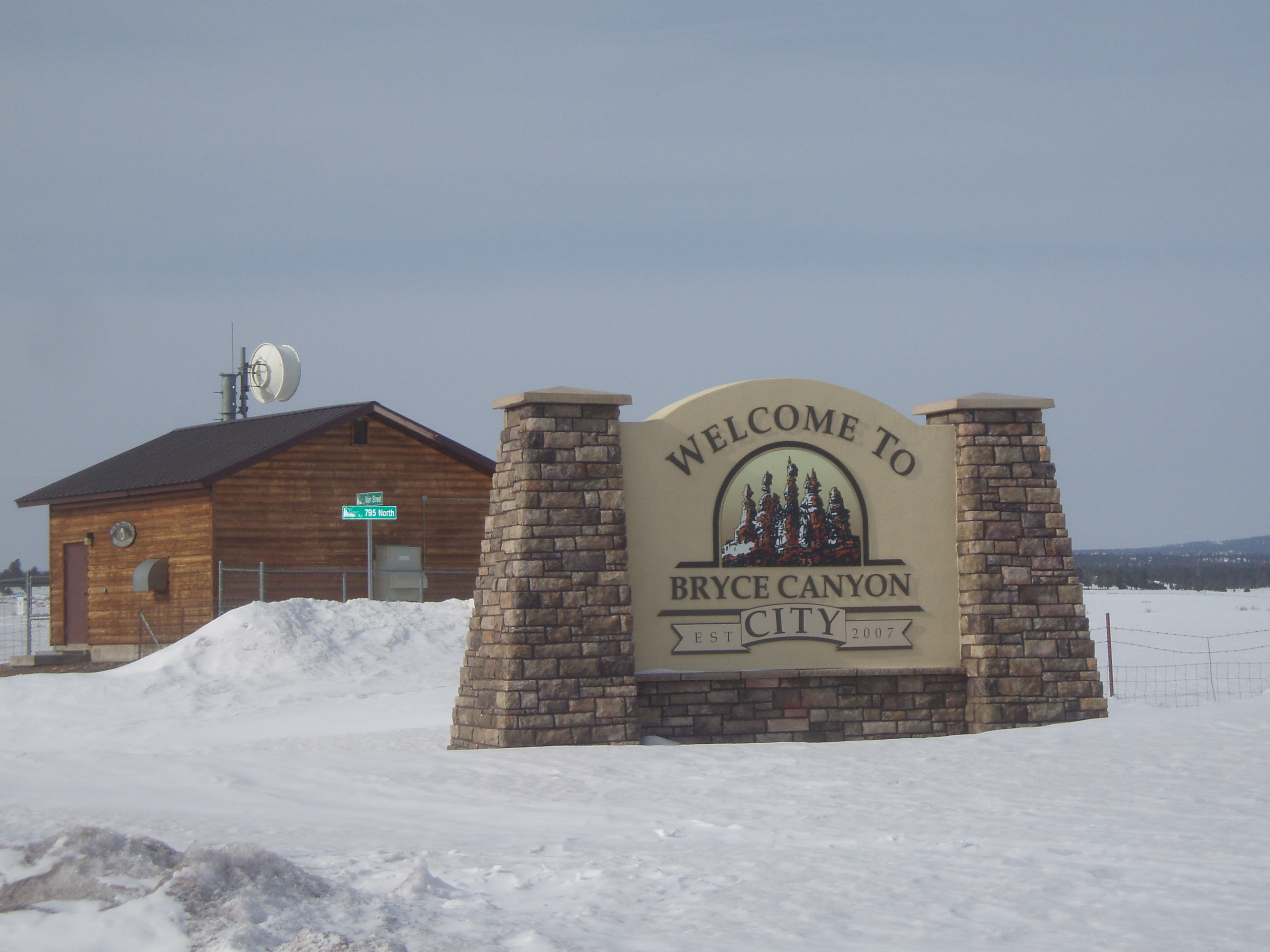
- Bryce Canyon City welcome sign, April 2010

- Location in Garfield County and state of Utah.
- Coordinates: 37°40′26″N 112°09′25″W
- Country: United States
- State: Utah
- County: Garfield
- Founded: 1916
- Incorporated: July 23, 2007
- Founder: Reuben C. "Ruby" Syrett
- Named for: Bryce Canyon

Government
  - Type: Mayor-council government
  - Mayor: Shiloh Syrett

Area
  - Total: 3.35 sq mi (8.67 km^{2})
  - Land: 3.35 sq mi (8.67 km^{2})
  - Water: 0 sq mi (0.00 km^{2})
- Elevation: 7,664 ft (2,336 m)

Population (2020)
  - Total: 336
  - Density: 66.4/sq mi (25.62/km^{2})
- Time zone: UTC-7 (Mountain (MST))
  - Summer (DST): UTC-6 (MDT)
- ZIP code: 84764
- Area code: 435
- GNIS feature ID: 2371469
- Website: www.brycecanyoncityut.gov

Bryce Canyon City, sometimes shown as Bryce on maps, is a town in Garfield County, Utah, United States, adjacent to Bryce Canyon National Park. Formerly known as Ruby's Inn, the town was officially incorporated on July 23, 2007, under a short-lived state law. The population was 336 at the 2020 census.

== History ==
Reuben C. "Ruby" Syrett built a lodge and cabins at the town's eventual location in 1916, when the promotion of Bryce Canyon for tourism was just beginning. Syrett's business grew alongside the park's popularity, particularly once it was made a national park in 1928. Ruby's Inn became an important junction, and its travelers' services developed into a small community. Syrett donated land to the state for construction of a road (now Utah State Route 63), strategically placing Ruby's Inn right at the entrance to the park.

In 2007, the Utah State Legislature unanimously passed H.B. 466, a bill that amended the state law on municipal incorporation petitions, allowing petitions for a new town with 100 to 999 residents to be filed with just the signatures of the owners of a majority of the land area, or a single majority landowner. If the petition met the conditions of state law, and its signers owned the majority of the land by value, the new law required the county government to grant the petition and appoint a mayor and town council from a list of individuals approved by the petitioners.

The Syrett family, owners of Ruby's Inn, had been seeking municipal incorporation for some time, hoping to qualify for a portion of county sales tax revenue to help fund the water system and other community infrastructure. Garfield County officials repeatedly denied the request, unwilling to give up some 10 percent of the county budget. After the passing of H.B. 466, the family filed a new petition, and on July 23, 2007, Bryce Canyon City became the first town incorporated under the amended law. It remained the only town incorporated under H.B. 466 until early 2008 when the law was amended to redefine the petition requirements.

== Demographics ==
Historical population
Census	Pop.	Note	%±
2010	198		—
2020	336		69.7%
U.S. Decennial Census

Bryce Canyon City is one of the few population centers in a sparsely populated, rural area. At incorporation, the officially estimated population was 138. A majority of the residents are members of the Syrett family, and nearly all of the adults are employees of Ruby's Inn. The year-round population is only a fraction of the people who occupy the town at the peak of tourist season, when employment swells to 600, and the number of visitors is in the thousands, more than the total population of Garfield County.

At the census of 2010, there were 198 people living in the town. There were 118 housing units. The racial makeup of the town was 62.6% White, 0.5% Black or African American, 4.5% American Indian and Alaska Native, 18.7% Asian, 12.6% from some other race, and 1.0% from two or more races. Hispanic or Latino of any race were 24.2% of the population.

== Geography ==
Bryce Canyon City is located around 20 miles (32 km) east of Panguitch, just outside the Bryce Canyon National Park entrance at the northwest corner, about 2.5 miles (4.0 km) north of the park's visitor center. The town lies alongside Utah State Route 63 near the park's popular Sunset Point. The town limits extend north to Utah State Route 12 at the north end of Route 63.

== Climate ==
The climate in this area has stark differences between highs and lows, and there is sparse rainfall year-round. According to the Köppen Climate Classification system, Bryce has a humid continental climate, abbreviated "Dfb" on climate maps.

Climate data for Bryce Canyon AP, Utah, 1991–2020 normals, 1948-2020 extremes: 7586ft (2312m)
Month	Jan	Feb	Mar	Apr	May	Jun	Jul	Aug	Sep	Oct	Nov	Dec	Year
Record high °F (°C)	58 (14)	61 (16)	70 (21)	77 (25)	87 (31)	94 (34)	94 (34)	94 (34)	92 (33)	79 (26)	68 (20)	61 (16)	94 (34)
Mean maximum °F (°C)	47.7 (8.7)	49.7 (9.8)	60.3 (15.7)	69.0 (20.6)	78.0 (25.6)	86.7 (30.4)	89.7 (32.1)	86.6 (30.3)	82.2 (27.9)	71.9 (22.2)	61.1 (16.2)	49.7 (9.8)	90.4 (32.4)
Mean daily maximum °F (°C)	35.7 (2.1)	37.6 (3.1)	45.3 (7.4)	53.9 (12.2)	64.3 (17.9)	76.3 (24.6)	81.4 (27.4)	78.6 (25.9)	71.2 (21.8)	59.2 (15.1)	45.7 (7.6)	35.1 (1.7)	57.0 (13.9)
Daily mean °F (°C)	20.9 (−6.2)	23.7 (−4.6)	31.6 (−0.2)	39.0 (3.9)	47.5 (8.6)	56.5 (13.6)	63.3 (17.4)	61.6 (16.4)	53.9 (12.2)	42.7 (5.9)	30.5 (−0.8)	20.4 (−6.4)	41.0 (5.0)
Mean daily minimum °F (°C)	6.1 (−14.4)	9.7 (−12.4)	17.8 (−7.9)	24.2 (−4.3)	30.8 (−0.7)	36.7 (2.6)	45.2 (7.3)	44.6 (7.0)	36.5 (2.5)	26.1 (−3.3)	15.2 (−9.3)	5.7 (−14.6)	24.9 (−4.0)
Mean minimum °F (°C)	−14.6 (−25.9)	−10.8 (−23.8)	−2.9 (−19.4)	11.9 (−11.2)	19.2 (−7.1)	25.6 (−3.6)	35.0 (1.7)	35.3 (1.8)	24.1 (−4.4)	13.6 (−10.2)	−3.5 (−19.7)	−14.4 (−25.8)	−19.2 (−28.4)
Record low °F (°C)	−32 (−36)	−28 (−33)	−20 (−29)	−5 (−21)	4 (−16)	18 (−8)	27 (−3)	22 (−6)	13 (−11)	−2 (−19)	−23 (−31)	−31 (−35)	−32 (−36)
Average precipitation inches (mm)	0.69 (18)	0.77 (20)	0.85 (22)	0.70 (18)	0.80 (20)	0.39 (9.9)	1.35 (34)	1.46 (37)	1.66 (42)	1.49 (38)	0.78 (20)	0.64 (16)	11.58 (294.9)
Average snowfall inches (cm)	12.6 (32)	12.6 (32)	12.3 (31)	5.8 (15)	2.2 (5.6)	0.1 (0.25)	0.0 (0.0)	0.0 (0.0)	0.2 (0.51)	2.3 (5.8)	7.9 (20)	9.9 (25)	65.9 (167.16)
Source 1: NOAA
Source 2: XMACIS2 (records, monthly max/mins & 1949-1982 snowfall)

Climate data for Bryce Canyon City
Month	Jan	Feb	Mar	Apr	May	Jun	Jul	Aug	Sep	Oct	Nov	Dec	Year
Record high °F (°C)	59.0 (15.0)	64.0 (17.8)	66.9 (19.4)	75.0 (23.9)	84.9 (29.4)	91.9 (33.3)	98.1 (36.7)	90.0 (32.2)	86.0 (30.0)	79.0 (26.1)	68.0 (20.0)	60.1 (15.6)	98.1 (36.7)
Mean daily maximum °F (°C)	35.8 (2.1)	38.3 (3.5)	44.1 (6.7)	52.7 (11.5)	63.3 (17.4)	73.8 (23.2)	79.9 (26.6)	76.8 (24.9)	69.4 (20.8)	58.3 (14.6)	44.4 (6.9)	36.7 (2.6)	56.1 (13.4)
Daily mean °F (°C)	22.8 (−5.1)	25.3 (−3.7)	31.1 (−0.5)	38.3 (3.5)	47.5 (8.6)	56.5 (13.6)	63.3 (17.4)	61.0 (16.1)	53.2 (11.8)	43.0 (6.1)	31.5 (−0.3)	23.7 (−4.6)	41.4 (5.2)
Mean daily minimum °F (°C)	9.9 (−12.3)	12.6 (−10.8)	18.0 (−7.8)	24.1 (−4.4)	31.6 (−0.2)	39.4 (4.1)	46.9 (8.3)	45.1 (7.3)	37.0 (2.8)	27.7 (−2.4)	18.3 (−7.6)	11.1 (−11.6)	26.8 (−2.9)
Record low °F (°C)	−26.0 (−32.2)	−26.0 (−32.2)	−11.0 (−23.9)	−2.9 (−19.4)	12.9 (−10.6)	21.0 (−6.1)	28.0 (−2.2)	23.0 (−5.0)	16.0 (−8.9)	0.0 (−17.8)	−16.1 (−26.7)	−23.1 (−30.6)	−26.0 (−32.2)
Average precipitation inches (mm)	1.5 (38)	1.5 (39)	1.4 (36)	0.9 (23)	0.9 (23)	0.6 (14)	1.4 (35)	2.1 (53)	1.6 (41)	1.5 (38)	1.1 (28)	1.1 (29)	15.6 (397)
Average snowfall inches (cm)	17.6 (44.7)	17.6 (44.7)	15.9 (40.4)	7.4 (18.8)	1.7 (4.3)	0.1 (0.2)	0.0 (0.0)	0.0 (0.0)	0.1 (0.2)	2.5 (6.3)	9.9 (25.1)	15.0 (38.1)	87.8 (222.8)
Average extreme snow depth inches (cm)	12 (30)	16 (40)	11 (27)	2.8 (7)	0 (0)	0 (0)	0 (0)	0 (0)	0 (0)	0 (0)	2.0 (5)	5.9 (15)	16 (40)
Average precipitation days	6	6	7	5	5	4	8	10	6	5	5	6	73
Mean daily daylight hours	10.4	11.3	12.4	13.7	14.7	15.2	15	14	12.8	11.6	10.6	10.1	12.6
Source: Weatherbase

== Government ==
Bryce Canyon City is a company town, comprising the property of Ruby's Inn and the Syrett family, its third-generation owners. Rod Syrett, the company's board president, was chosen as the first mayor.

== See also ==
- List of municipalities in Utah
