= Garfield County, Utah =

County in Utah, United States

- County
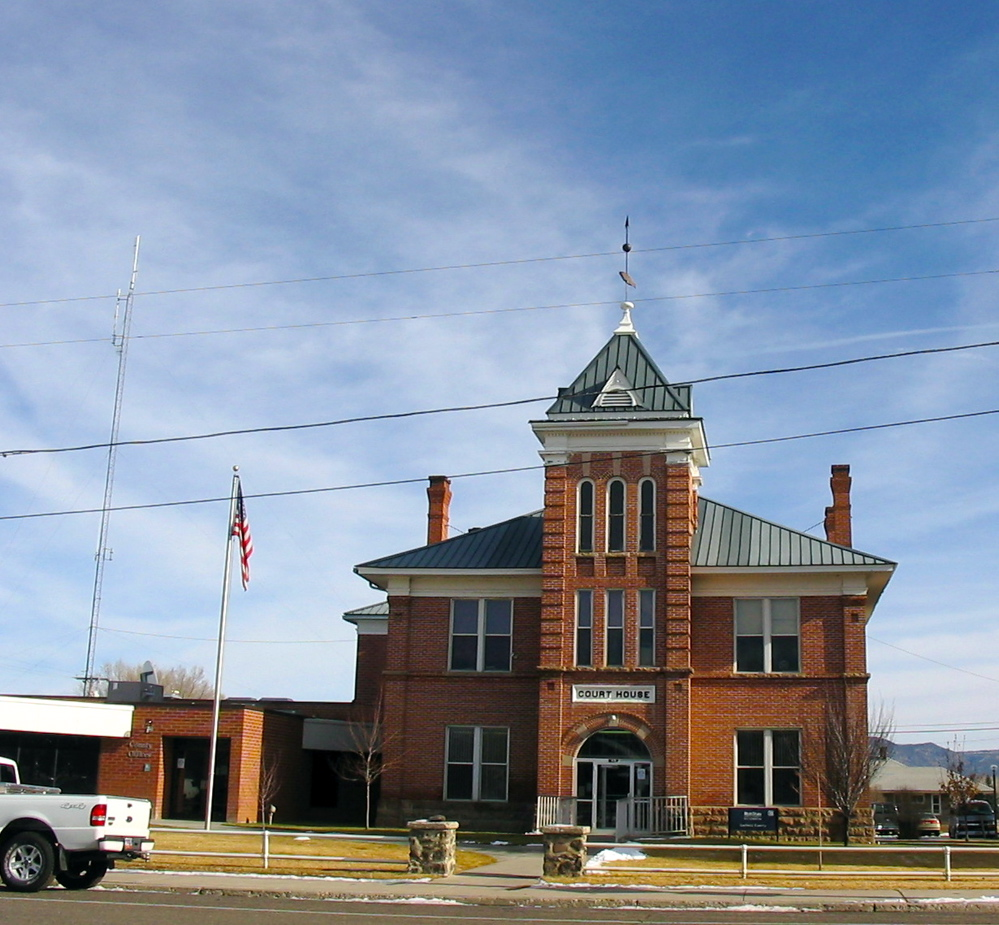
- Garfield County Courthouse in Panguitch, December 2006

- Location within the U.S. state of Utah
- Coordinates: 37.87°N 111.44°W
- Country: United States
- State: Utah
- Founded: March 9, 1882
- Named for: James A. Garfield
- Seat: Panguitch
- Largest city: Panguitch

Area
  - Total: 5,208 sq mi (13,490 km^{2})
  - Land: 5,175 sq mi (13,400 km^{2})
  - Water: 33 sq mi (85 km^{2}) 0.6%

Population (2020)
  - Total: 5,083
  - Estimate (2025): 5,256 ▲
  - Density: 0.98/sq mi (0.38/km^{2})
- Time zone: UTC−7 (Mountain)
  - Summer (DST): UTC−6 (MDT)
- Congressional district: 2nd
- Website: garfield.utah.gov

Garfield County is a county in south central Utah, United States. As of the 2020 United States census the population was 5,083, making it the fifth-least populous county in Utah; with about one inhabitant per square mile, it is also the least densely populated county in Utah. Its county seat and largest city is Panguitch.

== History ==
The Utah Territory legislature created the county on March 9, 1882, with areas partitioned from Iron County. It was named for James A. Garfield, the twentieth President of the United States, who had died six months earlier. The border with Iron County was adjusted in 1884, and Garfield County's boundaries have remained intact since then.

== Geography ==
The Colorado River, flowing southwestward through a deep gorge, forms the eastern boundary. The Dirty Devil River flows southward through the east end of the county to discharge into Colorado at the county's border. Westward, the cliffs of tributary canyons give way to the barren stretches of the San Rafael Desert, beyond which a variety of mountains, plateaus, and canyons make up the terrain. Most of Bryce Canyon National Park lies in the southwestern part of the county, and the northern half of the Grand Staircase–Escalante National Monument occupies the middle of the county. A large portion of Capitol Reef National Park lies in the east-central part of the county. A very small part of Canyonlands National Park lies in the northeast corner of the county. The terrain of Garfield County is arid, rough, and carved with erosion.

The county terrain generally slopes to the south and to the east. The county's highest point is Mount Ellen, in the Henry Mountains, near the county's north border, at 11,522 ft (3,512 m) ASL. The county has a total area of 5,208 square miles (13,490 km^{2}), of which 5,175 square miles (13,400 km^{2}) is land and 33 square miles (85 km^{2}) (0.6%) is water.

It is the fifth-largest county in Utah by area, and is about the same size as the state of Connecticut.

=== Airports ===
- Bryce Canyon Airport (BCE)

=== Major highways ===
- US Highway 89
- Utah Highway 12
- Utah Highway 22
- Utah Highway 63
- Utah Highway 95
- Utah Highway 143
- Utah Highway 276

=== Adjacent counties ===
- Wayne County - northeast
- San Juan County - east
- Kane County - south
- Iron County - west
- Beaver County - northwest
- Piute County - north

=== Protected areas ===
- Bryce Canyon National Park (part)
- Canyonlands National Park (part)
- Capitol Reef National Park (part)
- Carcass Canyon Wilderness Study Area
- Dixie National Forest (part)
- Escalante Petrified Forest State Park
- Fishlake National Forest (part)
- Glen Canyon National Recreation Area (part)
- Grand Staircase–Escalante National Monument (part)
- Mammoth Cave (US Forest Service)

=== Lakes ===
- Lake Powell (part)
- Panguitch Lake
- Wide Hollow Reservoir

== Demographics ==
Historical population
| Census | Pop. | Note | %± |
|---|---|---|---|
| 1890 | 2,457 | | — |
| 1900 | 3,400 | | 38.4% |
| 1910 | 3,660 | | 7.6% |
| 1920 | 4,768 | | 30.3% |
| 1930 | 4,642 | | −2.6% |
| 1940 | 5,253 | | 13.2% |
| 1950 | 4,151 | | −21.0% |
| 1960 | 3,577 | | −13.8% |
| 1970 | 3,157 | | −11.7% |
| 1980 | 3,673 | | 16.3% |
| 1990 | 3,980 | | 8.4% |
| 2000 | 4,735 | | 19.0% |
| 2010 | 5,172 | | 9.2% |
| 2020 | 5,083 | | −1.7% |
| 2025 (est.) | 5,256 | ▲ | 3.4% |
US Decennial Census; 1790–1960 1900–1990; 1990–2000 2010 2020

=== Racial and ethnic composition ===
Garfield County, Utah – Racial and ethnic composition Note: the US Census treats Hispanic/Latino as an ethnic category. This table excludes Latinos from the racial categories and assigns them to a separate category. Hispanics/Latinos may be of any race.
| Race / Ethnicity (NH = Non-Hispanic) | Pop 1980 | Pop 1990 | Pop 2000 | Pop 2010 | Pop 2020 | % 1980 | % 1990 | % 2000 | % 2010 | % 2020 |
|---|---|---|---|---|---|---|---|---|---|---|
| White alone (NH) | 3,557 | 3,868 | 4,440 | 4,740 | 4,446 | 96.84% | 97.19% | 93.77% | 91.65% | 87.47% |
| Black or African American alone (NH) | 1 | 1 | 8 | 13 | 5 | 0.03% | 0.03% | 0.17% | 0.25% | 0.10% |
| Native American or Alaska Native alone (NH) | 66 | 68 | 74 | 75 | 90 | 1.80% | 1.71% | 1.56% | 1.45% | 1.77% |
| Asian alone (NH) | 9 | 8 | 18 | 61 | 30 | 0.25% | 0.20% | 0.38% | 1.18% | 0.59% |
| Native Hawaiian or Pacific Islander alone (NH) | x | x | 2 | 10 | 7 | x | x | 0.04% | 0.19% | 0.14% |
| Other race alone (NH) | 4 | 0 | 5 | 2 | 3 | 0.11% | 0.00% | 0.11% | 0.04% | 0.06% |
| Mixed race or Multiracial (NH) | x | x | 52 | 37 | 118 | x | x | 1.10% | 0.72% | 2.32% |
| Hispanic or Latino (any race) | 36 | 35 | 136 | 234 | 384 | 0.98% | 0.88% | 2.87% | 4.52% | 7.55% |
| Total | 3,673 | 3,980 | 4,735 | 5,172 | 5,083 | 100.00% | 100.00% | 100.00% | 100.00% | 100.00% |

=== 2020 census ===
According to the 2020 United States census and 2020 American Community Survey, there were 5,083 people in Garfield County with a population density of 1.0 people per square mile (0.4/km^{2}). Among non-Hispanic or Latino people, the racial makeup was 4,446 (87.5%) White, 5 (0.1%) African American, 90 (1.8%) Native American, 30 (0.6%) Asian, 7 (0.1%) Pacific Islander, 3 (0.1%) from other races, and 118 (2.3%) from two or more races. 384 (7.6%) people were Hispanic or Latino.

There were 2,619 (51.52%) males and 2,464 (48.48%) females, and the population distribution by age was 1,202 (23.6%) under the age of 18, 2,682 (52.8%) from 18 to 64, and 1,199 (23.6%) who were at least 65 years old. The median age was 43.3 years.

There were 1,881 households in Garfield County with an average size of 2.70 of which 1,323 (70.3%) were families and 558 (29.7%) were non-families. Among all families, 1,100 (58.5%) were married couples, 83 (4.4%) were male householders with no spouse, and 140 (7.4%) were female householders with no spouse. Among all non-families, 479 (25.5%) were a single person living alone and 79 (4.2%) were two or more people living together. 528 (28.1%) of all households had children under the age of 18. 1,504 (80.0%) of households were owner-occupied while 377 (20.0%) were renter-occupied.

The median income for a Garfield County household was $44,279 and the median family income was $65,266, with a per-capita income of $23,926. The median income for males that were full-time employees was $49,904 and for females $34,773. 16.4% of the population and 11.3% of families were below the poverty line.

In terms of education attainment, out of the 3,484 people in Garfield County 25 years or older, 221 (6.3%) had not completed high school, 1,067 (30.6%) had a high school diploma or equivalency, 1,312 (37.7%) had some college or associate degree, 648 (18.6%) had a bachelor's degree, and 236 (6.8%) had a graduate or professional degree.

=== Ancestry ===
As of 2010 the largest self-identified ancestry groups in Garfield County are:

- English - 46.2%
- German - 14.8%
- Irish - 10.1%
- Danish - 6.6%
- Scottish - 4.9%
- Welsh - 3.9%
- Scotch-Irish - 2.5%
- Swedish - 2.3%
- Norwegian - 2.2%

== Politics and government ==
Garfield County has traditionally voted Republican. In no national election since 1936 has the county selected the Democratic Party candidate (as of 2024).

State elected offices
| Position | District | Name | Affiliation | First elected |
|---|---|---|---|---|
| Senate | 24 | Derrin Owens | Republican | 2020 |
| House of Representatives | 73 | Phil Lyman | Republican | 2018 |
| Board of Education | 14 | Mark Huntsman | Nonpartisan | 2014 |

United States presidential election results for Garfield County, Utah
| Year | Republican | | Democratic | | Third party(ies) | |
| Year | No. | % | No. | % | No. | % |
|---|---|---|---|---|---|---|
| 1896 | 249 | 28.82% | 615 | 71.18% | 0 | 0.00% |
| 1900 | 649 | 62.16% | 395 | 37.84% | 0 | 0.00% |
| 1904 | 679 | 70.14% | 252 | 26.03% | 37 | 3.82% |
| 1908 | 722 | 68.50% | 290 | 27.51% | 42 | 3.98% |
| 1912 | 673 | 62.60% | 249 | 23.16% | 153 | 14.23% |
| 1916 | 516 | 37.50% | 843 | 61.26% | 17 | 1.24% |
| 1920 | 1,023 | 71.49% | 393 | 27.46% | 15 | 1.05% |
| 1924 | 823 | 69.57% | 308 | 26.04% | 52 | 4.40% |
| 1928 | 1,024 | 75.63% | 325 | 24.00% | 5 | 0.37% |
| 1932 | 1,125 | 68.43% | 493 | 29.99% | 26 | 1.58% |
| 1936 | 842 | 47.52% | 928 | 52.37% | 2 | 0.11% |
| 1940 | 1,030 | 55.86% | 814 | 44.14% | 0 | 0.00% |
| 1944 | 842 | 60.06% | 559 | 39.87% | 1 | 0.07% |
| 1948 | 924 | 58.97% | 642 | 40.97% | 1 | 0.06% |
| 1952 | 1,065 | 69.07% | 477 | 30.93% | 0 | 0.00% |
| 1956 | 1,115 | 75.95% | 353 | 24.05% | 0 | 0.00% |
| 1960 | 1,083 | 69.69% | 471 | 30.31% | 0 | 0.00% |
| 1964 | 821 | 55.51% | 658 | 44.49% | 0 | 0.00% |
| 1968 | 1,033 | 69.47% | 314 | 21.12% | 140 | 9.41% |
| 1972 | 1,290 | 80.47% | 242 | 15.10% | 71 | 4.43% |
| 1976 | 1,163 | 65.48% | 539 | 30.35% | 74 | 4.17% |
| 1980 | 1,578 | 78.31% | 375 | 18.61% | 62 | 3.08% |
| 1984 | 1,609 | 83.15% | 315 | 16.28% | 11 | 0.57% |
| 1988 | 1,470 | 79.25% | 370 | 19.95% | 15 | 0.81% |
| 1992 | 1,235 | 62.28% | 309 | 15.58% | 439 | 22.14% |
| 1996 | 1,330 | 72.01% | 283 | 15.32% | 234 | 12.67% |
| 2000 | 1,719 | 87.35% | 178 | 9.04% | 71 | 3.61% |
| 2004 | 1,848 | 85.48% | 264 | 12.21% | 50 | 2.31% |
| 2008 | 1,710 | 78.37% | 405 | 18.56% | 67 | 3.07% |
| 2012 | 1,832 | 83.96% | 308 | 14.12% | 42 | 1.92% |
| 2016 | 1,606 | 67.96% | 358 | 15.15% | 399 | 16.89% |
| 2020 | 2,158 | 78.99% | 514 | 18.81% | 60 | 2.20% |
| 2024 | 2,211 | 78.66% | 541 | 19.25% | 59 | 2.10% |

== Communities ==
Communities in Garfield County, Utah

=== Cities ===
- Escalante
- Panguitch (county seat)

=== Towns ===
- Antimony
- Bryce Canyon City
- Boulder
- Cannonville
- Hatch
- Henrieville
- Tropic

=== Unincorporated communities ===
- Hillsdale
- Ticaboo
- Widtsoe

== Education ==
All portions of the county are in the Garfield School District.

== See also ==
- List of counties in Utah
- National Register of Historic Places listings in Garfield County, Utah
