= List of canyons and gorges in Utah =

This is a partial list of canyons in the U.S. state of Utah along with any rivers, roads, and other features (such as rail lines) that pass through them.

Name	County	River	Road	Other
American Fork Canyon	Utah	American Fork	SR-92, SR-144	
Argyle Canyon	Duchesne	Argyle Creek	Argyle Canyon Road	
Beaver Canyon	Beaver	Beaver River	SR-153	
Beaver Canyon	Weber	Beaver Creek	SR-39	
Big Cottonwood Canyon	Salt Lake	Big Cottonwood Creek	SR-190	
Bingham Canyon	Salt Lake	Bingham Creek	SR-209	Savage Bingham and Garfield Railroad (ex-D&RGW)
Bluejohn Canyon	Wayne			site of Aron Ralston's accident
Box Elder Canyon	Box Elder	Box Elder Creek	US-91	
Butterfield Canyon	Salt Lake	Butterfield Creek	Butterfield Canyon Road	
Cataract Canyon	Garfield, San Juan, Wayne	Colorado River		
Cedar Canyon	Iron	Coal Creek, Crow Creek	SR-14	
Circleville Canyon	Garfield	Sevier River	US-89	Old Spanish Trail
City Creek	Salt Lake	City Creek	City Creek Canyon Road	
Corner Canyon	Salt Lake		Corner Canyon Road	unconstructed SR-71 (1931-1935)
Cottonwood Canyon	Kane	Cottonwood Creek	Cottonwood Canyon Road	
Coyote Gulch	Garfield, Kane			Hole in the Rock Trail
Croton Canyon	Kane County	Colorado River		
Crystal Canyon	Juab	Unnamed intermittent stream		
Daniels Canyon	Wasatch	Daniels Creek	US-40	
Daves Hollow	Garfield	Unnamed stream		
Death Hollow	Garfield	Mamie Creek		Also known as Little Death Hollow
Desolation Canyon	Carbon, Emery, Grand, Uintah	Green River		
East Canyon	Morgan, Summit	East Canyon Creek	SR-65, SR-66, Jeremy Ranch Road	Mormon Trail
East Canyon	San Juan	East Canyon Wash	East Canyon Road	Old Spanish Trail
Eccles Canyon	Carbon		SR-264	
Echo Canyon	Summit	Echo Creek	I-80	Mormon Trail
Emigration Canyon	Salt Lake	Emigration Creek	Emigration Canyon Road	Mormon Trail
Canyons of the Escalante	Garfield, Kane	Escalante River	SR-12	Hole in the Rock Trail
Fairview Canyon	Sanpete	Cottonwood Creek	SR-31	
Flaming Gorge	Daggett	Green River		
Flat Canyon	Juab, Sanpete	Maple Creek		
Flat Canyon	Sanpete		SR-264	
Gate Canyon	Duchesne		Nine Mile Canyon Road	
Glen Canyon	Garfield, Kane, San Juan	Colorado River		
Grandstaff Canyon	Grand	unnamed tributary of the Colorado River	SR-128	name officially changed from Negro Bill Canyon in 2017
Gray Canyon	Emery, Grand	Green River		
Harker Canyon	Tooele	Harker Creek	Harker Road	
Harkers Canyon	Salt Lake			
Hell Roaring Canyon	Grand	unnamed tributary of the Green River		
Hideout Canyon	Daggett	Green River		
Hobble Creek Canyon	Utah	Hobble Creek	Hobble Creek Road	
Holt Canyon	Washington		Meadow Canyon Road	Old Spanish Trail
Homansville Canyon	Utah		US-6	
Horse Canyon	Emery, Carbon		SR-124 (south end)	Book Cliffs
Horse Canyon	Garfield			
Horse Canyon	Grand			Book Cliffs
Horseshoe Canyon	Emery, Wayne	Barrier Creek		
Horseshoe Canyon	Daggett	Green River		
Indian Canyon	Duchesne	unnamed tributary of the Strawberry River	US-191	
Johnson Canyon	Kane	Johnson Wash	Johnson Canyon Road	
Kingfisher Canyon	Daggett	Green River		
Kings Meadow Canyon	Sevier	Peterson Creek	SR-24	
Kingston Canyon	Piute	East Fork Sevier River	SR-62	
Labyrinth Canyon	Iron			Cedar Breaks National Monument
Labyrinth Canyon	Emery, Grand, San Juan, Wayne	Green River		
Lambs Canyon	Salt Lake		Lambs Canyon Road	
Little Cottonwood Canyon	Salt Lake	Little Cottonwood Creek	SR-210	
Little Emigration Canyon	Morgan			Mormon Trail
Little Grand Canyon	Emery	San Rafael River		
Logan Canyon	Cache	Logan River	US-89	
Maple Canyon	Sanpete			
Maple Canyon	Utah		Maple Canyon Road	
Marysvale Canyon	Piute, Sevier	Sevier River	US-89	former D&RGW Marysvale Branch
Middle Canyon	Iron	Bear Creek	Bear Valley Road (old SR-20)	Old Spanish Trail
Middle Canyon	Tooele		Middle Canyon Road	
Millcreek Canyon	Salt Lake	Mill Creek	Millcreek Canyon Road	
Mount Aire Canyon	Salt Lake		Mount Aire Canyon Road	
Narrow Canyon	Garfield, San Juan	Colorado River		
The Narrows	Washington	North Fork Virgin River		
Ninemile Canyon	Uintah, Carbon, Duchesne	Nine Mile Creek	Nine Mile Canyon Road	
Ogden Canyon	Weber	Ogden River	SR-39	
Ontario Canyon	Summit		SR-224	
Overland Canyon	Tooele			Central Overland Trail
Parley's Canyon	Salt Lake	Parley's Creek	I-80	
Parowan Canyon	Iron	Parowan Creek	SR-143	
Parunuweap Canyon	Kane, Washington	East Fork Virgin River		
Payson Canyon	Utah	Peteetneet Creek	Nebo Loop Scenic Byway	
Pony Express Canyon	Tooele			Central Overland Trail
Price Canyon	Carbon, Utah	Price River	US-6	Union Pacific Railroad Provo Subdivision (ex-D&RGW)
Provo Canyon	Utah, Wasatch	Provo River	US-189	Heber Valley Historic Railroad (ex-D&RGW)
Red Canyon	Daggett	Green River		
Red Canyon	Garfield	fork of the Sevier River	SR-12	
Red Butte Canyon	Salt Lake	Red Butte Creek	Red Butte Canyon Road	
Rock Canyon	Utah			Rock Canyon Trail
Ruby Canyon	Grand	Colorado River		UP Green River Subdivision (ex-D&RGW)
Salina Canyon	Sevier	Salina Creek	I-70	Old Spanish Trail
Salt Creek Canyon	Juab	Salt Creek	SR-132	
Sevenmile Canyon	San Juan		SR-313	
Snow Canyon	Washington			
Soldier Canyon	Carbon	Soldier Creek	Nine Mile Canyon Road	
Soldier Canyon	Sevier			Old Spanish Trail
South Fork Canyon	Weber	South Fork Ogden River	SR-39	
Spanish Fork Canyon	Utah	Spanish Fork, Soldier Creek	US-6	UP Provo Subdivision (ex-D&RGW)
Split Mountain Canyon	Uintah	Green River		
Stillwater Canyon	San Juan, Wayne	Green River		
Swallow Canyon	Daggett	Green River		
Weber Canyon	Davis, Morgan, Weber	Weber River	I-84	
Wellsville Canyon	Cache		US-89, US-91	
Westwater Canyon	Grand	Colorado River		
Whirlpool Canyon	Uintah	Green River		
White Canyon	San Juan		SR-95 (on the rim)	
Willow Canyon	Uintah, Grand			
Willow Creek Canyon	Millard			
Willow Creek Canyon	Sevier			
Wolverine Canyon	Garfield	Wolverine Creek		
Zion Canyon	Washington	North Fork Virgin River	Floor of the Valley Road	
