= Canyon =

Deep chasm between cliffs

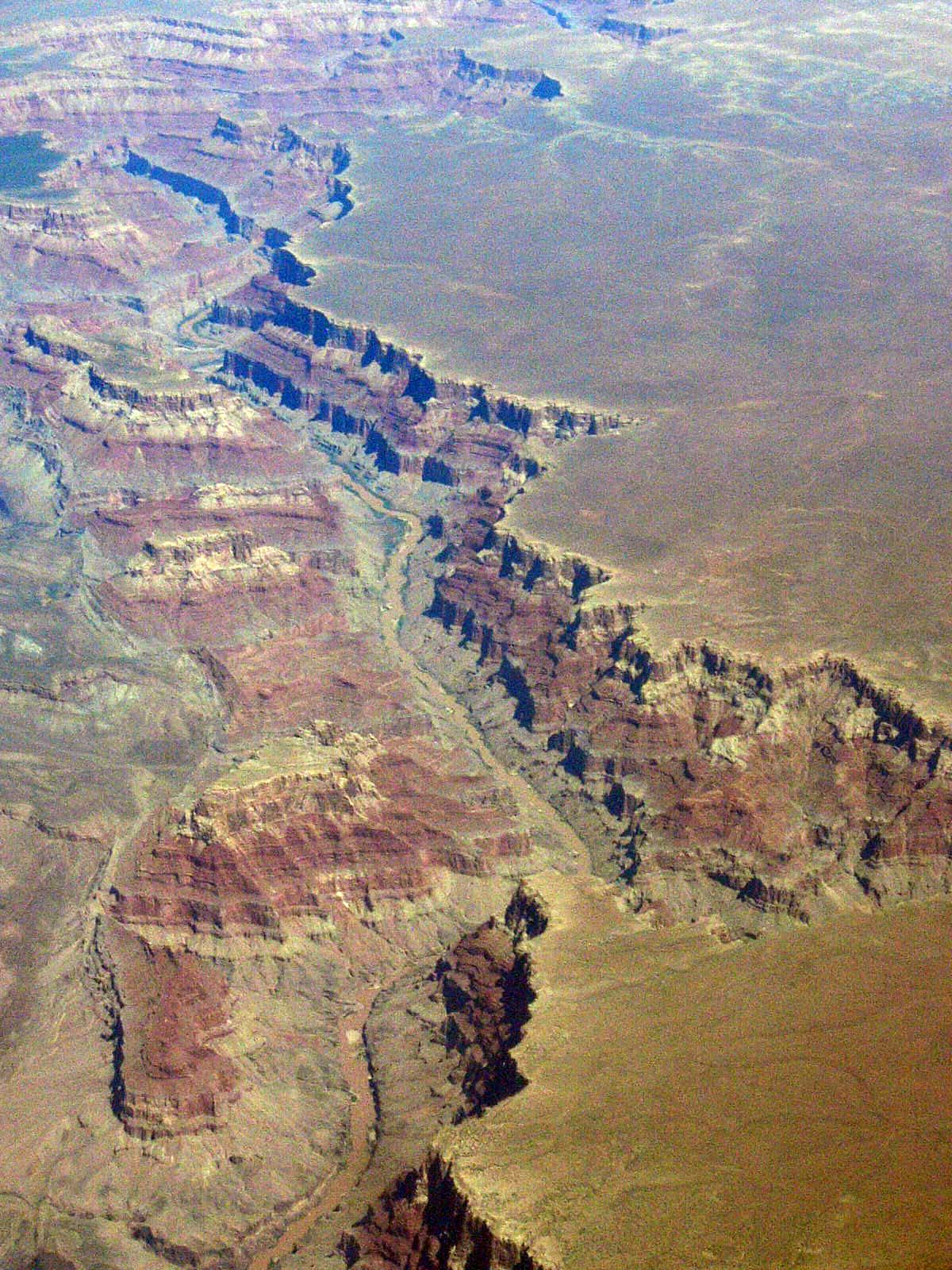
Grand Canyon, Arizona, at the confluence of the Colorado River and Little Colorado River

A canyon (from Spanish cañón; archaic British English spelling: cañon), gorge or chasm, is a deep cleft between escarpments or cliffs resulting from weathering and the erosive activity of a river over geologic time scales. Rivers have a natural tendency to cut through underlying surfaces, eventually wearing away rock layers as sediments are removed downstream. A river bed will gradually reach a baseline elevation, which is the same elevation as the body of water into which the river drains. The processes of weathering and erosion will form canyons when the river's headwaters and estuary are at significantly different elevations, particularly through regions where softer rock layers are intermingled with harder layers more resistant to weathering.

A canyon may also refer to a rift between two mountain peaks, such as those in ranges including the Rocky Mountains, the Alps, the Himalayas or the Andes. Usually, a river or stream carves out such splits between mountains. Examples of mountain-type canyons are Provo Canyon in Utah or Yosemite Valley in California's Sierra Nevada. Canyons within mountains, or gorges that have an opening on only one side, are called box canyons. Slot canyons are very narrow canyons that often have smooth walls.

Steep-sided valleys in the seabed of the continental slope are referred to as submarine canyons. Unlike canyons on land, submarine canyons are thought to be formed by turbidity currents and landslides.

== Etymology ==
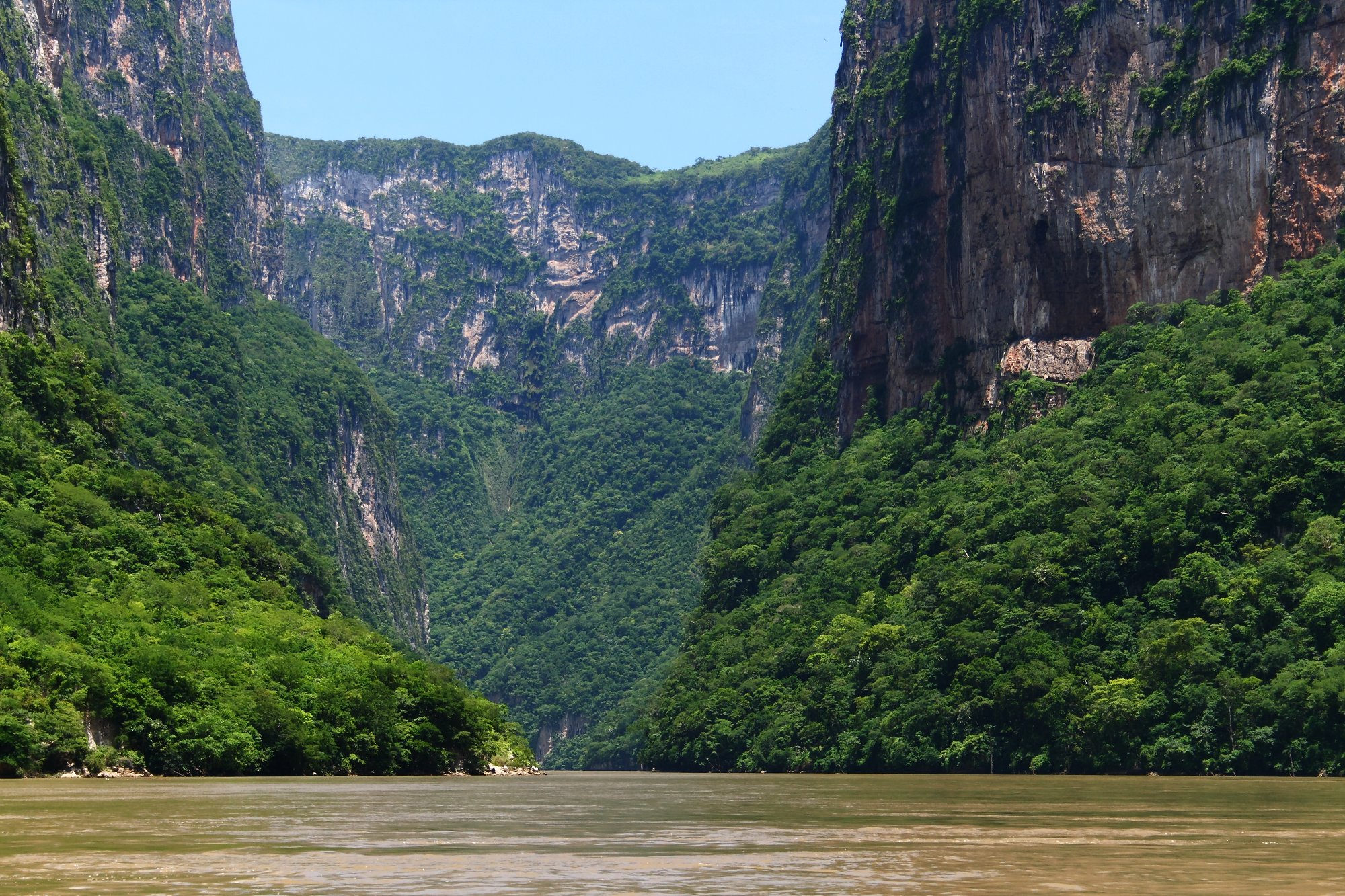
Sumidero Canyon, Mexico

The word "canyon" is Spanish in origin (cañón, pronounced [kaˈɲon]), with the same meaning. The word canyon is generally used in North America, while the words gorge and ravine (French in origin) are used in Europe and Oceania, though gorge and ravine are also used in some parts of North America. In the United States, place names generally use canyon in the southwest (due to their proximity to Spanish-speaking Mexico) and gorge in the northeast (which is closer to French Canada), with the rest of the country graduating between these two according to geography. In Canada, a gorge is usually narrow while a ravine is more open and often wooded. The military-derived word defile is occasionally used in the United Kingdom. In South Africa, kloof (in Krantzkloof Nature Reserve) is used along with canyon (as in Blyde River Canyon) and gorge (in Oribi Gorge).

== Formation ==
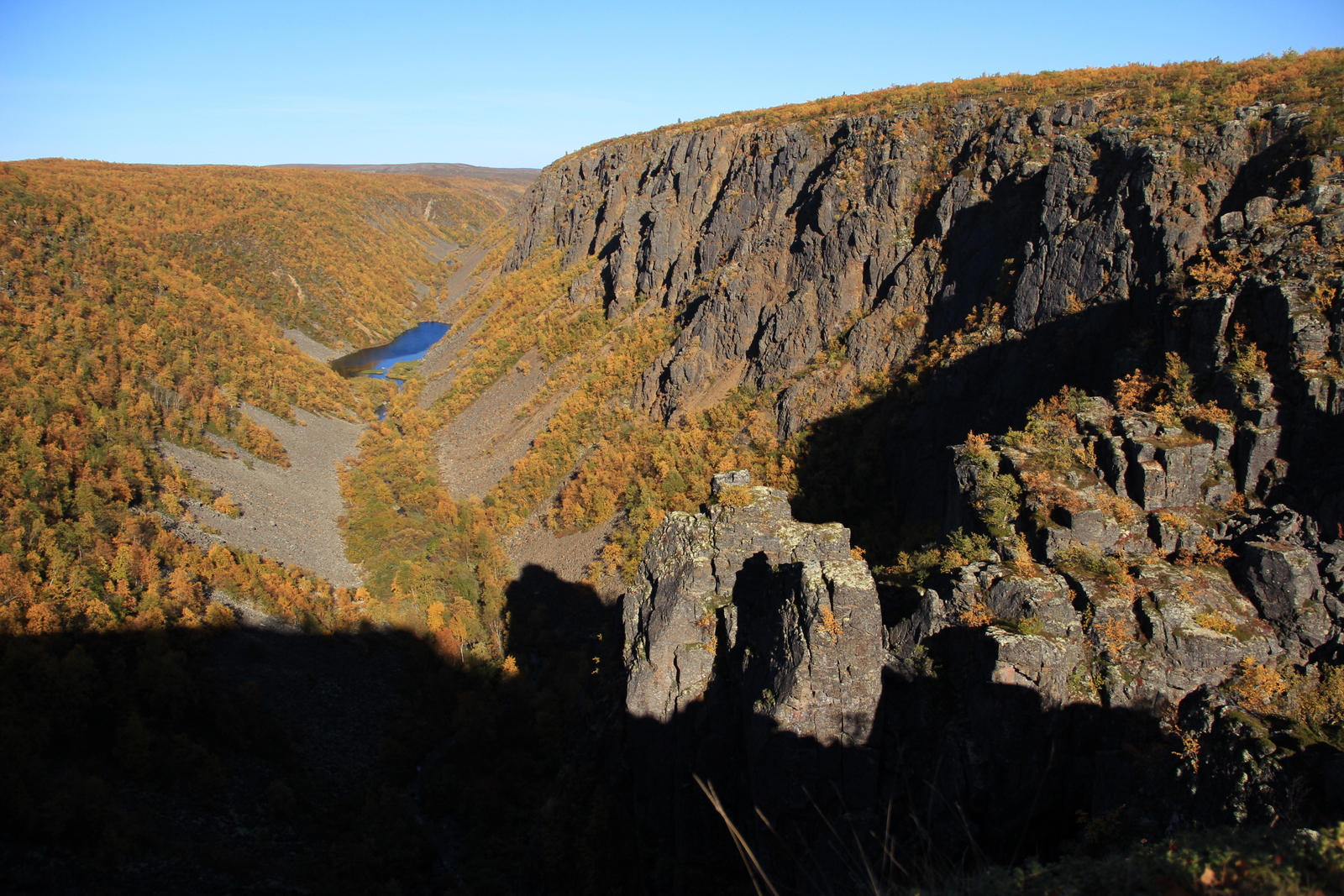
Kevo Canyon in Utsjoki, Finland

Most canyons were formed by a process of long-time erosion from a plateau or table-land level. The cliffs form because harder rock strata that are resistant to erosion and weathering remain exposed on the valley walls.

Canyons are much more common in arid areas than in wet areas because physical weathering has a more localized effect in arid zones. The wind and water from the river combine to erode and cut away less resistant materials such as shales. The freezing and expansion of water also serves to help form canyons. Water seeps into cracks between the rocks and freezes, pushing the rocks apart and eventually causing large chunks to break off the canyon walls, in a process known as frost wedging. Canyon walls are often formed of resistant sandstones or granite.

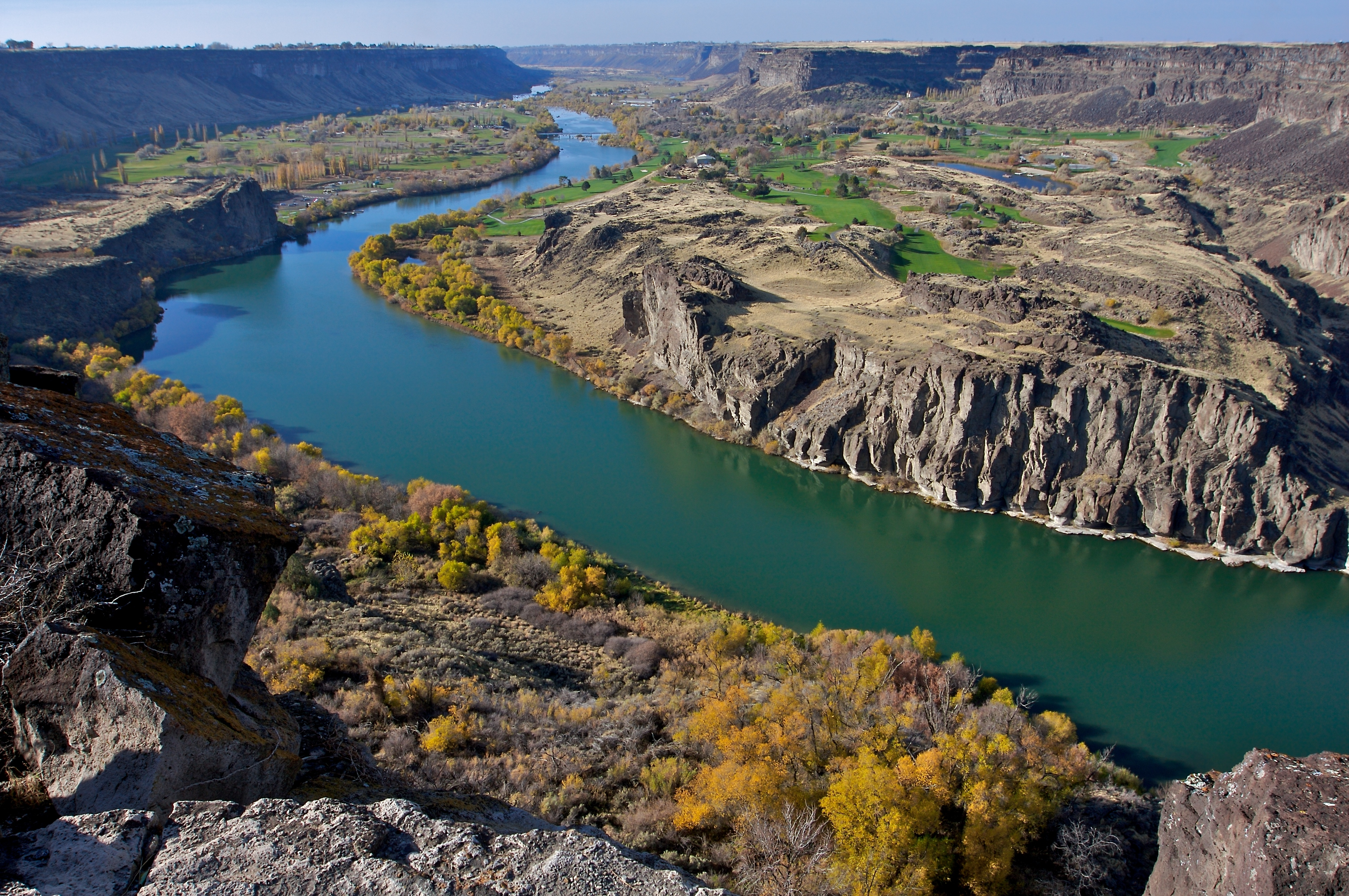
Snake River Canyon, Idaho

Sometimes large rivers run through canyons as the result of gradual geological uplift. These are called entrenched rivers, because they are unable to easily alter their course. In the United States, the Colorado River in the Southwest and the Snake River in the Northwest are two examples of tectonic uplift.

Canyons often form in areas of limestone rock. As limestone is soluble to a certain extent, cave systems form in the rock. When a cave system collapses, a canyon is left, as in the Mendip Hills in Somerset and Yorkshire Dales in Yorkshire, England.

=== Box canyon ===
A box canyon is a small canyon that is generally shorter and narrower than a river canyon, with steep walls on three sides, allowing access and egress only through the mouth of the canyon. Box canyons were frequently used in the western United States as convenient corrals, with their entrances fenced.

== Largest ==
The definition of "largest canyon" is imprecise, because a canyon can be large by its depth, its length, or the total area of the canyon system. Also, the inaccessibility of the major canyons in the Himalaya contributes to them not being regarded as candidates for the biggest canyon. The definition of "deepest canyon" is similarly imprecise, especially if one includes both mountain canyons (which do not have a well-defined rim elevation) and canyons cut through relatively flat plateaus (which have a somewhat well-defined rim elevation).

The Yarlung Tsangpo Grand Canyon (or Tsangpo Canyon), along the Yarlung Tsangpo River in Tibet, China, is regarded by some as the deepest canyon on Earth at 5,500 metres (18,000 ft). It is slightly longer than Grand Canyon in the United States. Others consider the Kali Gandaki Gorge in midwest Nepal to be the deepest canyon, with a 6,400-metre (21,000 ft) difference between the level of the river and the peaks surrounding it.

Vying for the deepest canyon in the Americas is the Cotahuasi Canyon and Colca Canyon, in southern Peru. Both have been measured at over 3,500 metres (11,500 ft) deep.

Grand Canyon of northern Arizona in the United States, with an average depth of 1,600 metres (5,200 ft) and a volume of 4.17 trillion cubic metres (147 trillion cubic feet), is one of the world's largest canyons. It was among the 28 finalists of the New 7 Wonders of Nature worldwide poll. (Some referred to it as one of the seven natural wonders of the world.)

The largest canyon in Europe is Tara River Canyon, ~1,300 metres (4,300 ft) deep.

The largest canyon in Africa is the Fish River Canyon in Namibia, ~550 metres (1,800 ft) deep.

In August 2013, the discovery of Greenland's Grand Canyon was reported, based on the analysis of data from Operation IceBridge. It is located under an ice sheet. At 750 kilometres (470 mi) long, it is believed to be the longest canyon in the world.

Despite not being quite as deep or long as the Grand Canyon, the Capertee Valley in Australia is actually 1 km wider than the Grand Canyon, making it the widest canyon in the world.

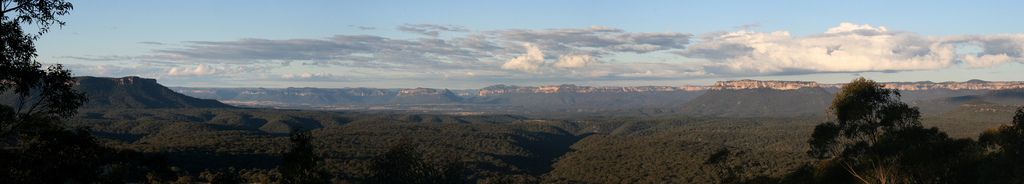
Panoramic view of the Capertee Valley in Australia, the widest largest canyon in the world

== Cultural significance ==
Some canyons have notable cultural significance. Evidence of archaic humans has been discovered in Africa's Olduvai Gorge. In the southwestern United States, canyons are important archeologically because of the many cliff-dwellings built in such areas, largely by the ancient Pueblo people who were their first inhabitants.

== Notable examples ==
The following list contains only the most notable canyons of the world, grouped by region.

=== Africa ===
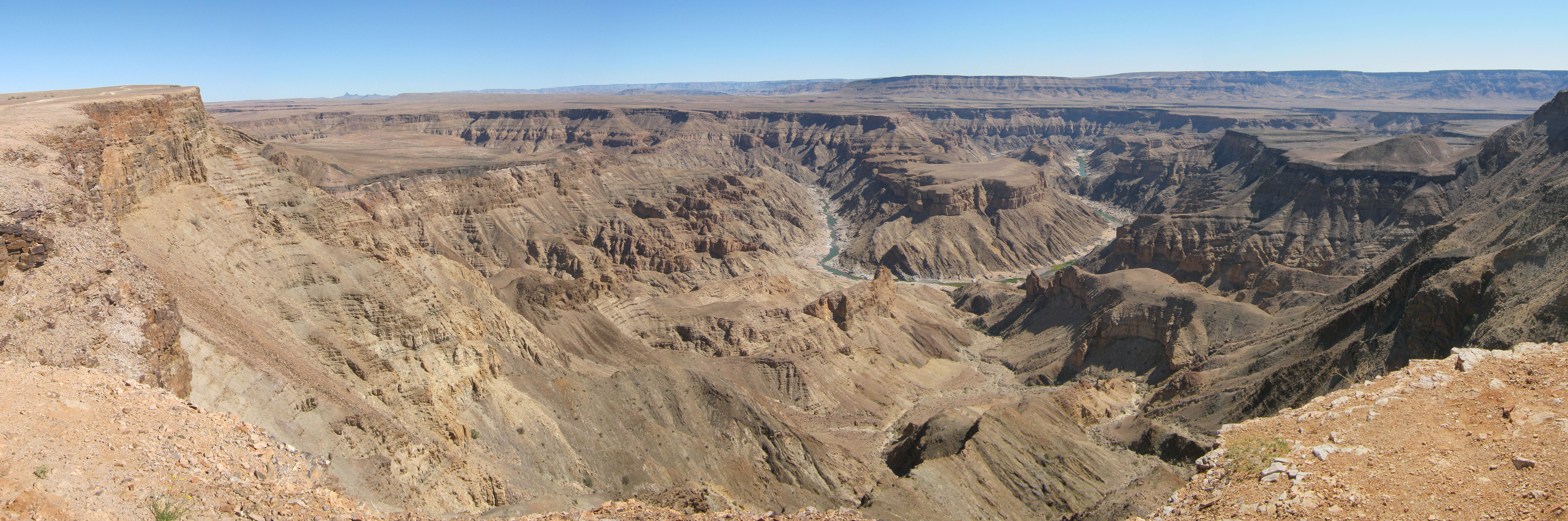
Fish River Canyon, Namibia

==== Namibia ====
- Fish River Canyon

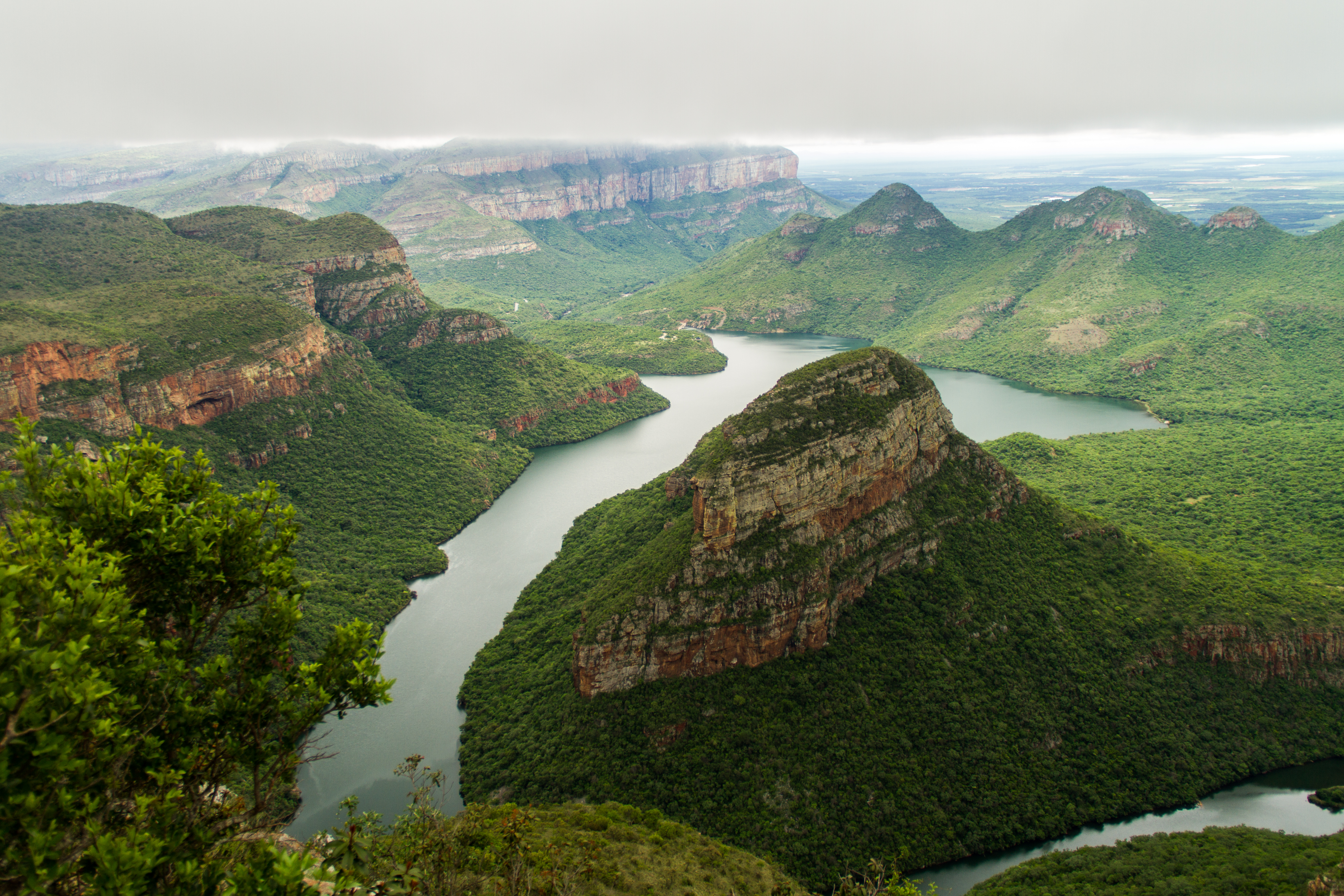
Blyde River Canyon, South Africa

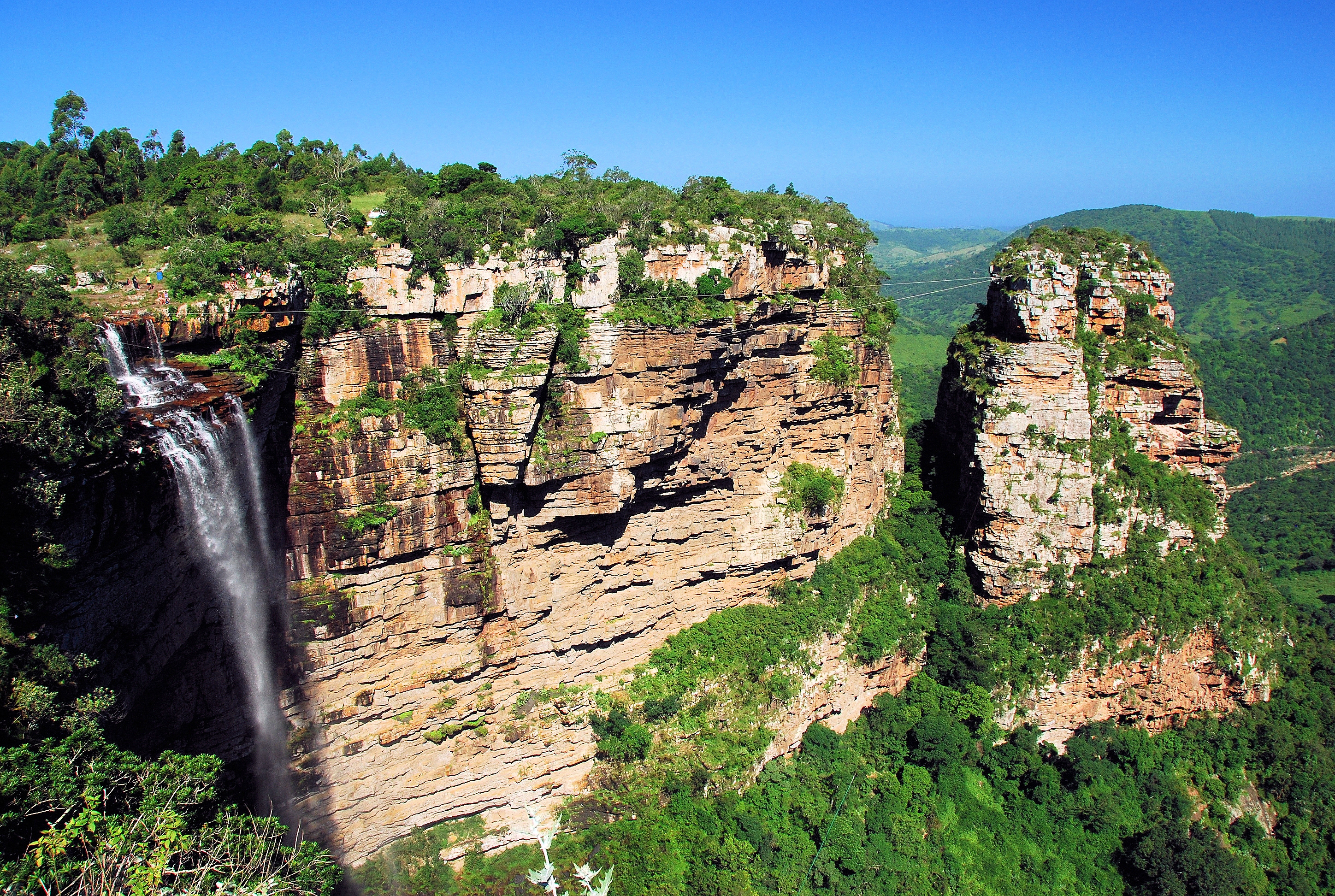
Oribi Gorge, Kwa-Zulu Natal

==== South Africa ====
- Blyde River Canyon, Mpumalanga
- Oribi Gorge, KwaZulu-Natal

==== Tanzania ====
- Olduvai Gorge

=== Americas ===
==== Argentina ====
- Atuel Canyon, Mendoza Province

==== Brazil ====
- Itaimbezinho Canyon, Rio Grande do Sul

==== Bolivia ====
- Torotoro River Canyon

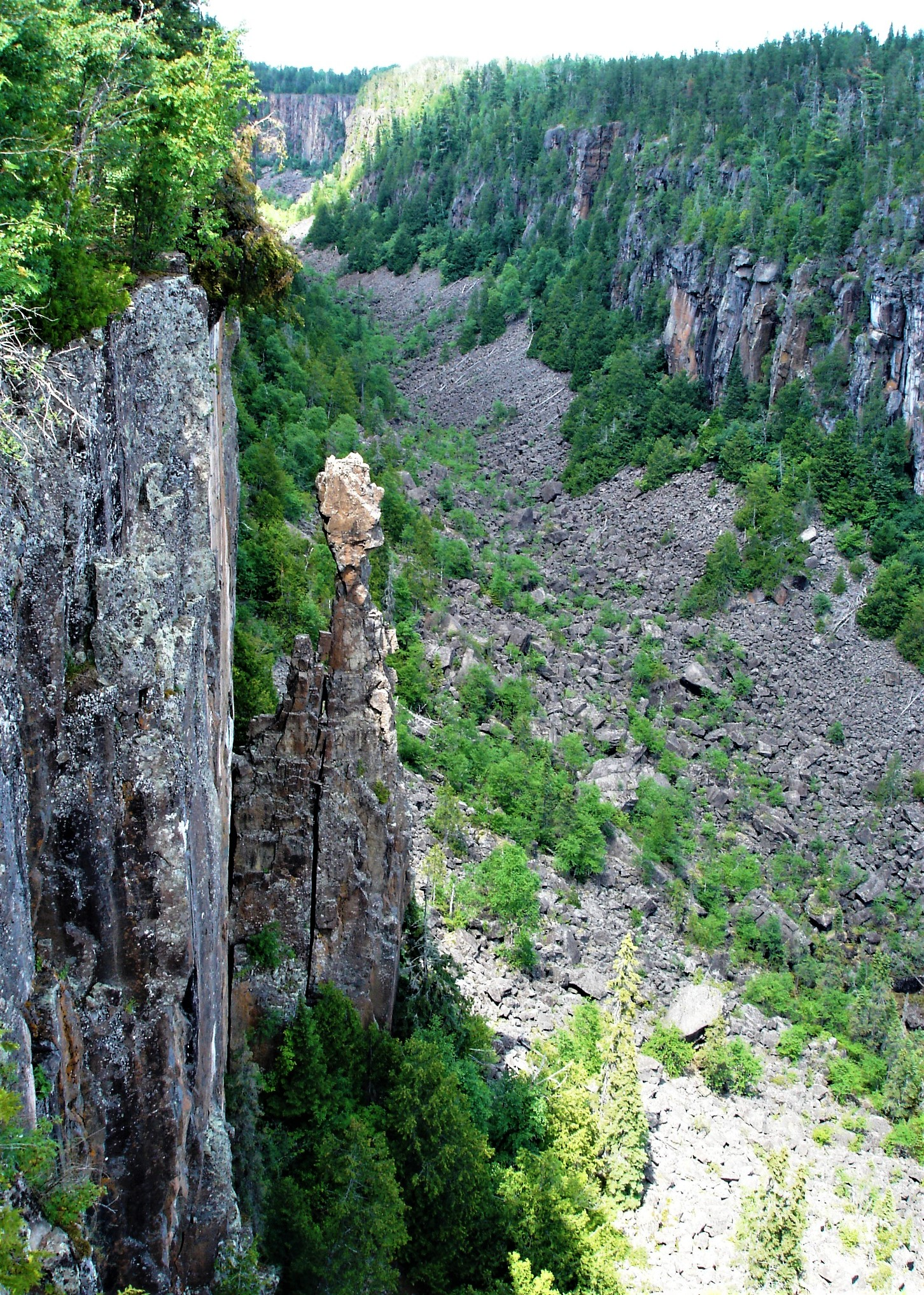
Ouimet Canyon, Ontario, Canada

==== Canada ====
- Grand Canyon of the Stikine, British Columbia
- Horseshoe Canyon, Alberta
- Niagara Gorge, Ontario
- Ouimet Canyon, Ontario
- Fraser Canyon, British Columbia
- Coaticook Gorge, Quebec
- Thompson Canyon, British Columbia

==== Colombia ====
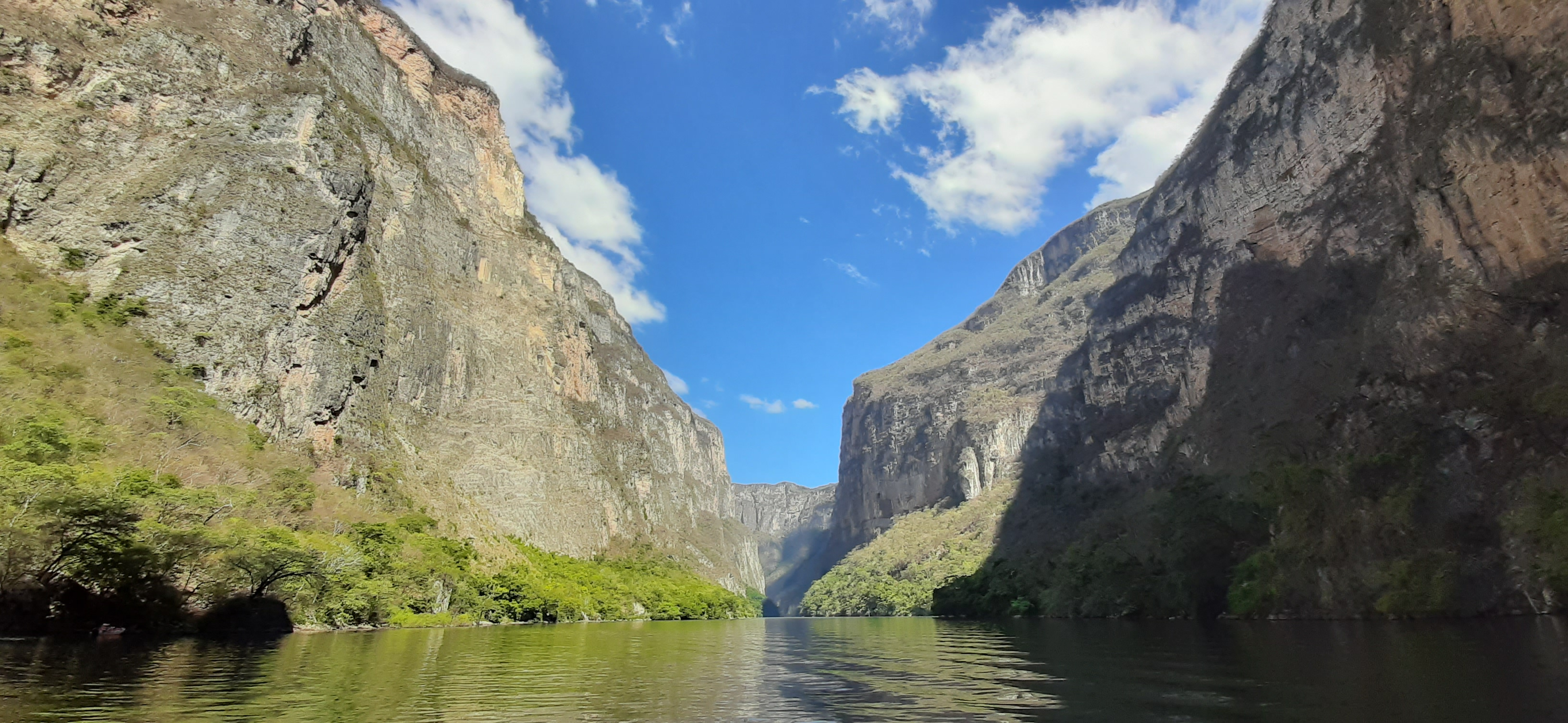
- Sumidero Canyon, Mexico
  Chicamocha Canyon, Santander Department

==== Mexico ====
- Barranca de Oblatos, Jalisco
- Copper Canyon, Chihuahua
- Sumidero Canyon, Chiapas

==== Peru ====
- Cañón del Pato, Ancash Region
- Colca Canyon, Arequipa Region
- Cotahuasi Canyon, Arequipa Region

==== United States ====
- American Fork Canyon, Utah
- Antelope Canyon, Arizona
- Apple River Canyon, Illinois
- Ausable Chasm, New York
- Big Cottonwood Canyon, Utah
- Black Canyon of the Gunnison, Colorado
- Black Hand Gorge, Ohio
- Blackwater Canyon, West Virginia
- Blue Creek Canyon, Colorado
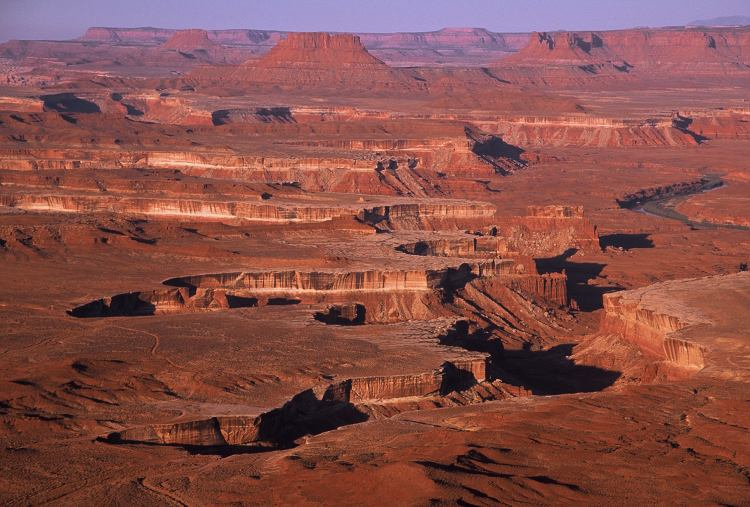
- Green River overlook, Canyonlands National Park, Utah, U.S.
  Bluejohn Canyon, Utah
- Box Canyon, Colorado
- Breaks Canyon, Kentucky and Virginia
- Butterfield Canyon, Utah
- Cane Creek, Alabama
- Canyon de Chelly, Arizona
- Canyonlands National Park, canyons of the Colorado River and its main tributary the Green River, Utah
- Cheat Canyon, West Virginia
- Clifton Gorge, Ohio
- Clifty Canyon, Indiana
- Cloudland Canyon, Georgia
- Columbia River Gorge, Oregon and Washington
- Conkle's Hollow, Ohio
- Cottonwood Canyon, Utah
- Crooked River Gorge, Oregon
- Death Hollow, Utah
- Desolation Canyon, Utah
- Dismals Canyon, Alabama
- Flaming Gorge, Wyoming and Utah
- Flume Gorge, New Hampshire
- Glen Canyon, Utah and Arizona
- Glenwood Canyon, Colorado
- Gore Canyon, Colorado
- Grand Canyon, Arizona
- Grand Canyon of the Yellowstone, Wyoming
- Grandstaff Canyon, Utah
- Guffey Gorge, Colorado
- Gulf Hagas, Maine
- Hells Canyon, Idaho, Oregon, and Washington
- Horse Canyon, Utah
- Kern River Canyon, California
- Kings Canyon, Utah
- Kings Canyon, California
- Leslie Gulch, Oregon
- Linville Gorge, North Carolina
- Little Cottonwood Canyon, Utah
- Little Grand Canyon, Illinois
- Little River Canyon, Alabama
- Logan Canyon, Utah
- Mather Gorge, Maryland
- Marysvale Canyon, Utah
- McCormick's Creek Canyon, Indiana
- Millcreek Canyon, Utah
- New River Gorge, West Virginia
- Ninemile Canyon, Utah
- Ogden Canyon, Utah
- Oneonta Gorge, Oregon
- Palo Duro Canyon, Texas
- Parleys Canyon, Utah
- Pine Creek Gorge, Pennsylvania
- Poudre Canyon, Colorado
- Providence Canyon, Georgia
- Provo Canyon, Utah
- Quechee Gorge, Vermont
- Red River Gorge, Kentucky
- Rio Grande Gorge, New Mexico
- Royal Gorge, Colorado
- Ruby Canyon, Utah
- Snake River Canyon, Idaho
- Snow Canyon, Utah
- Stillwater Canyon, Utah
- Tallulah Gorge, Georgia
- Tenaya Canyon, California
- Tennessee River Gorge, Alabama and Tennessee
- The Trough, West Virginia
- Unaweep Canyon, Colorado
- Uncompahgre Gorge, Colorado
- Waimea Canyon, Hawaii
- Walls of Jericho, Alabama
- Weber Canyon, Utah
- Westwater Canyon, Utah
- Wolverine Canyon, Utah
- White Canyon, Utah
- Zion Canyon, Utah

=== Asia ===
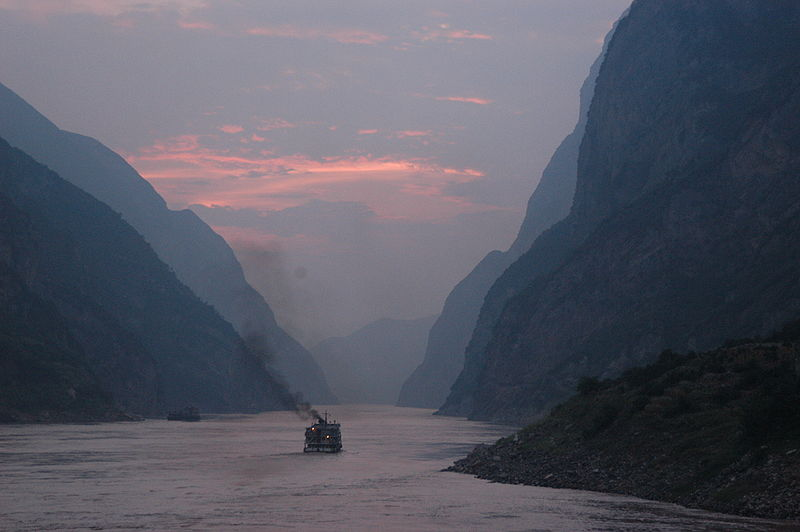
One of the Three Gorges of the Yangtze River, China

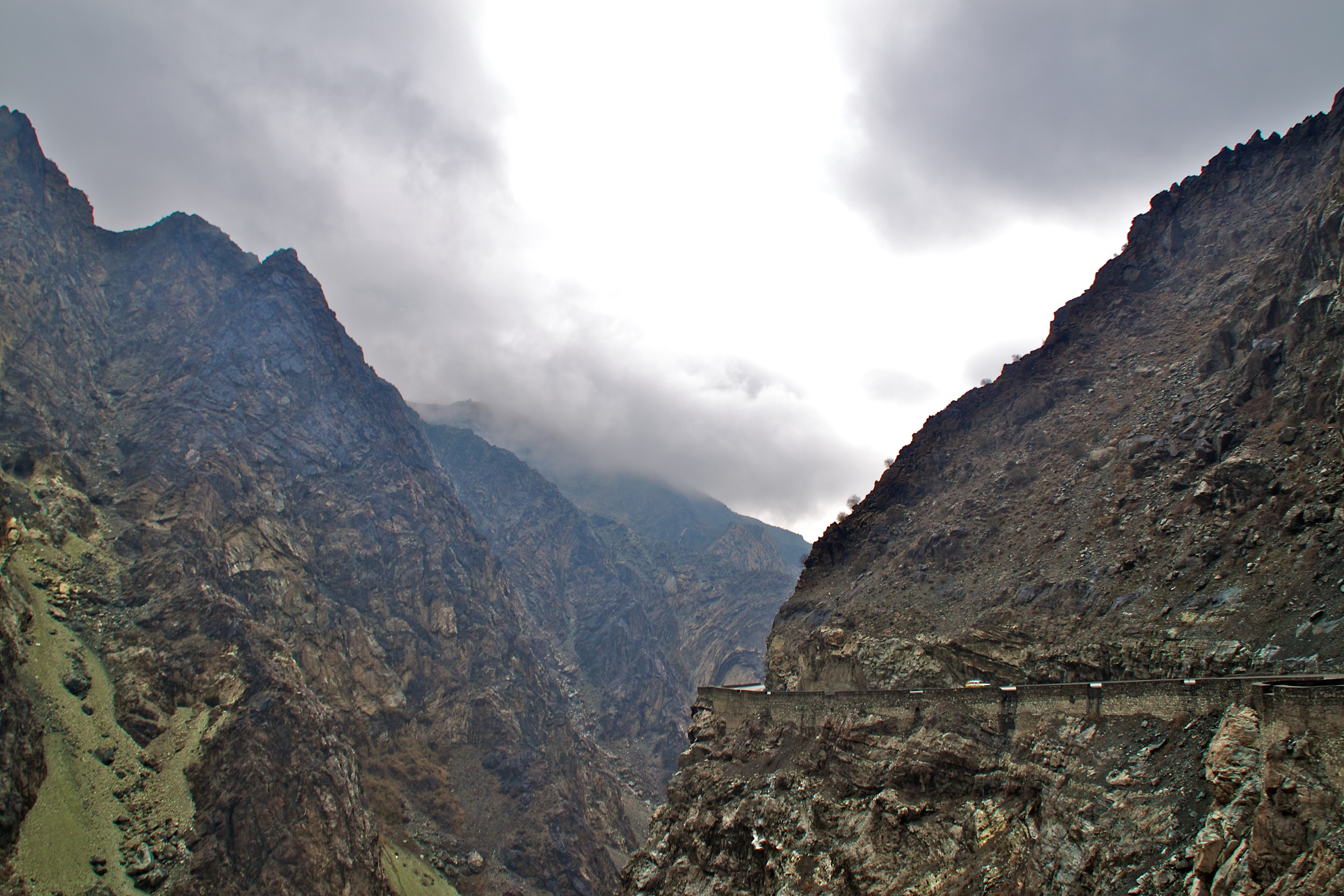
The gorge of the Kabul River in Afghanistan

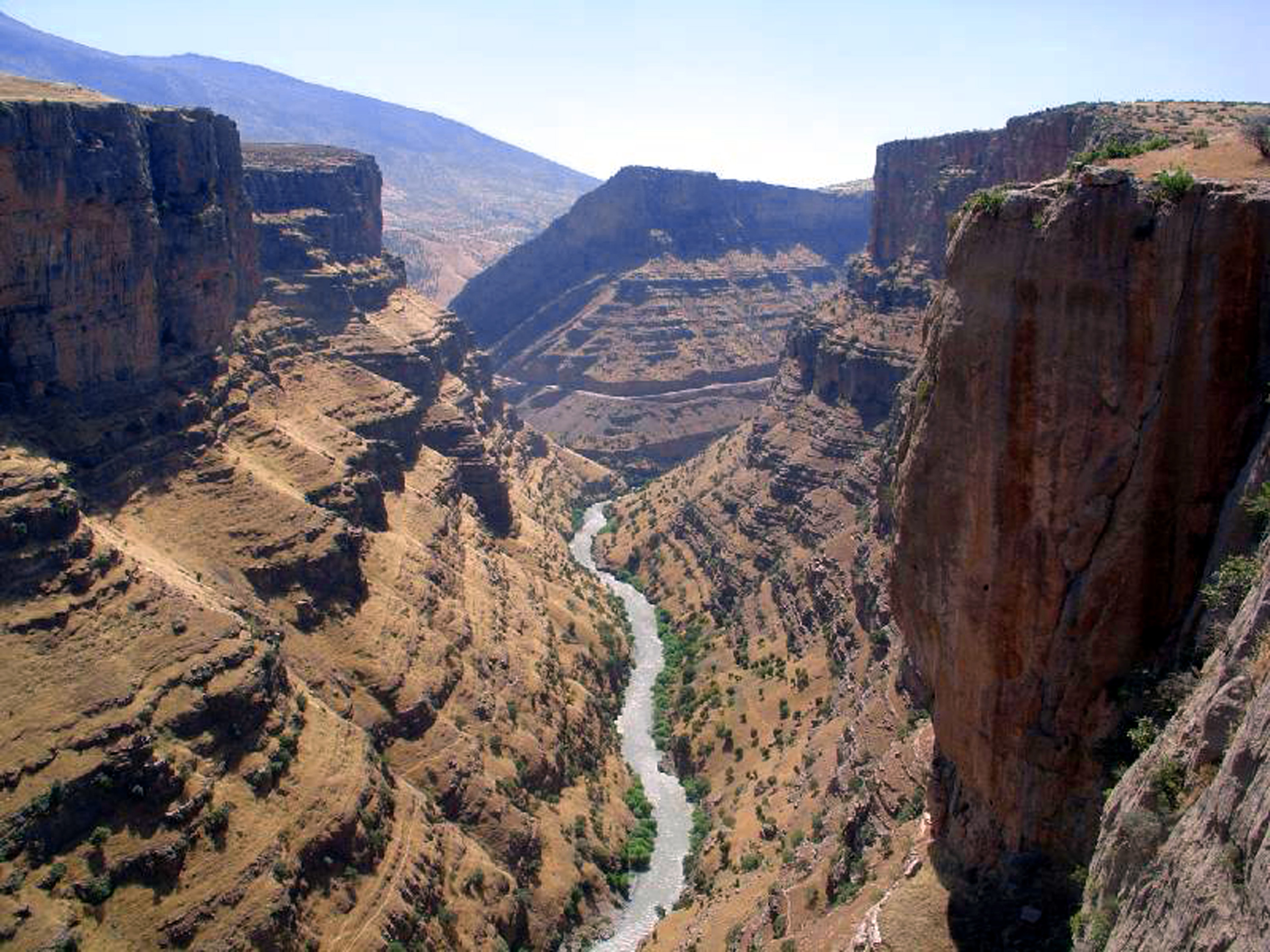
Rawandiz Gorge, Iraq

==== China ====
- Three Gorges, Chongqing
- Tiger Leaping Gorge, Yunnan
- Yarlung Zangbo Grand Canyon, Tibet Autonomous Region

==== India ====
- Gandikota, Kadapa District, Andhra Pradesh
- Raneh Falls, Chatarpur district, Madhya Pradesh
- Idukki, Western Ghats, Kerala

==== Indonesia ====
- Cukang Taneuh, Pangandaran, West Java
- Sianok Valley, Bukittinggi, West Sumatra

==== Others ====
- Afghanistan – Tang-e Gharu
- Iran – Haygher Canyon in Fars province
- Iraq - Rawandiz Gorge in Kurdistan Region
- Japan – Kiyotsu Gorge in Niigata Prefecture
- Japan – Tenryū-kyō in Nagano Prefecture
- Kazakhstan – Charyn Canyon
- Nepal – Kali Gandaki Gorge
- Russia – Delyun-Uran (Vitim River)
- Pakistan – Indus River Gorge through the Himalaya
- Taiwan – Taroko Gorge in Hualien County
- Turkey – Ulubey Canyon in Uşak Province
- Turkey – Ihlara Valley in Aksaray Province
- Syria – Rabweh in Damascus

=== Europe ===
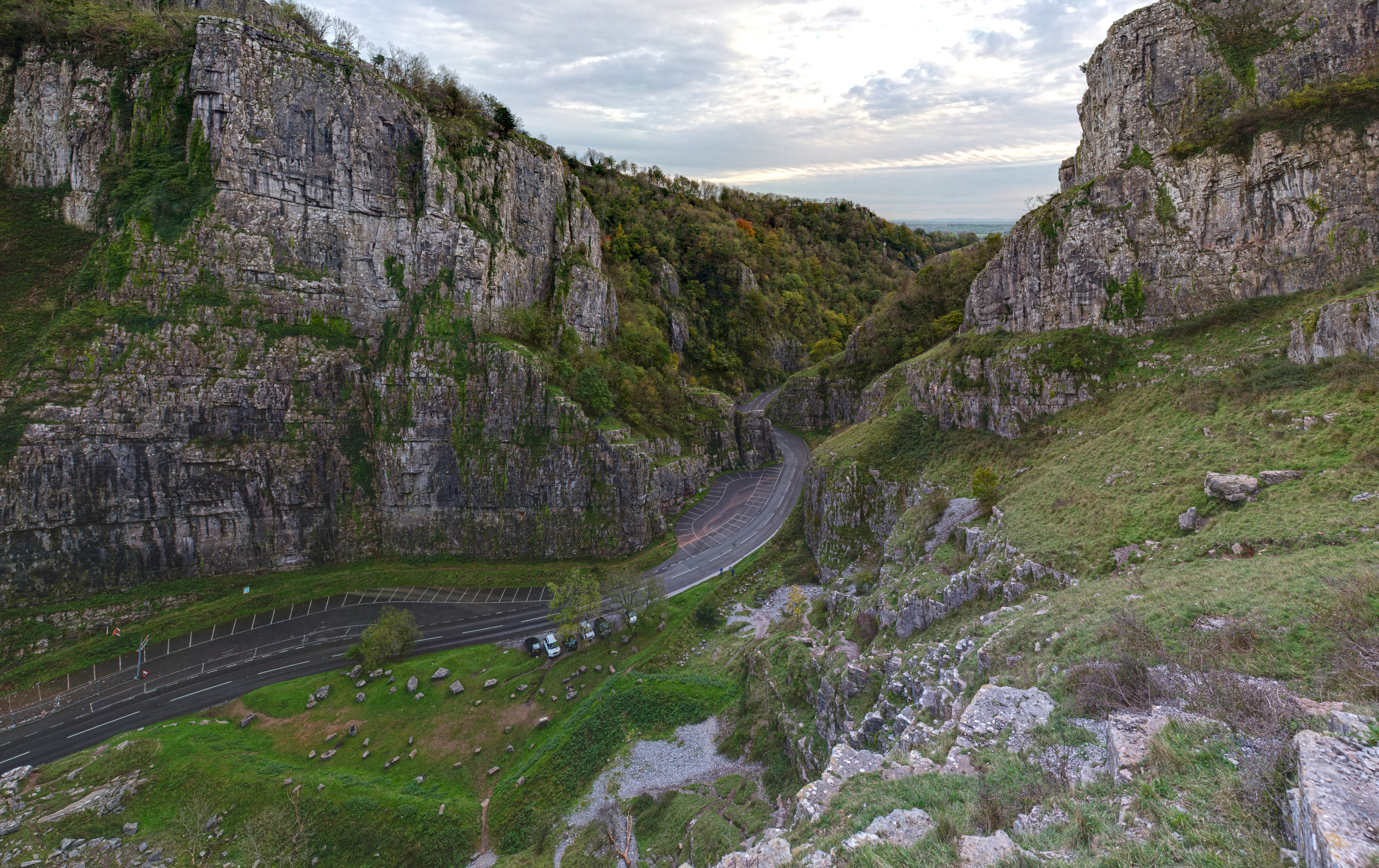
Cheddar Gorge, England

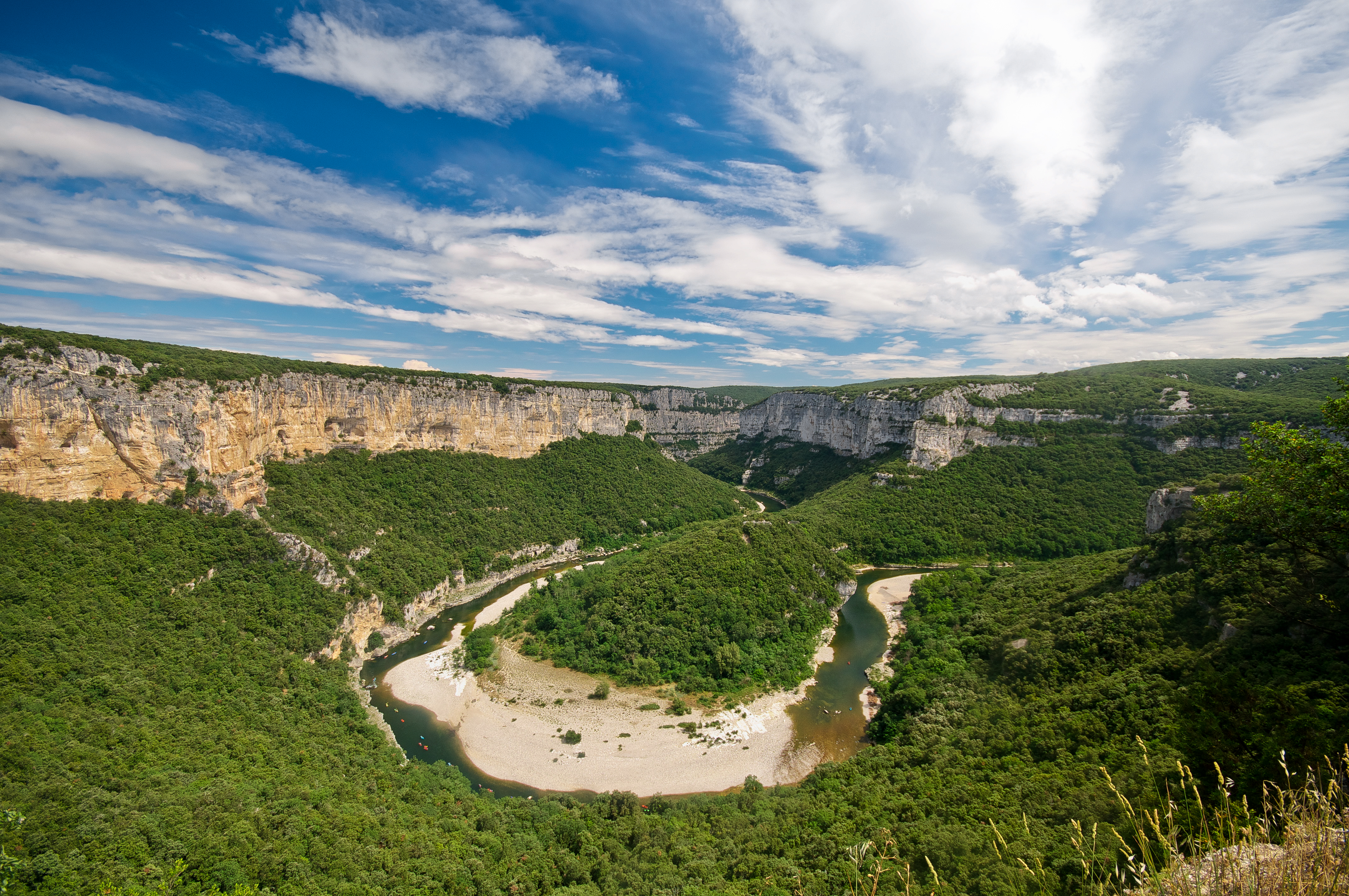
Le cirque de la Madeleine, Gorges de l'Ardèche, France

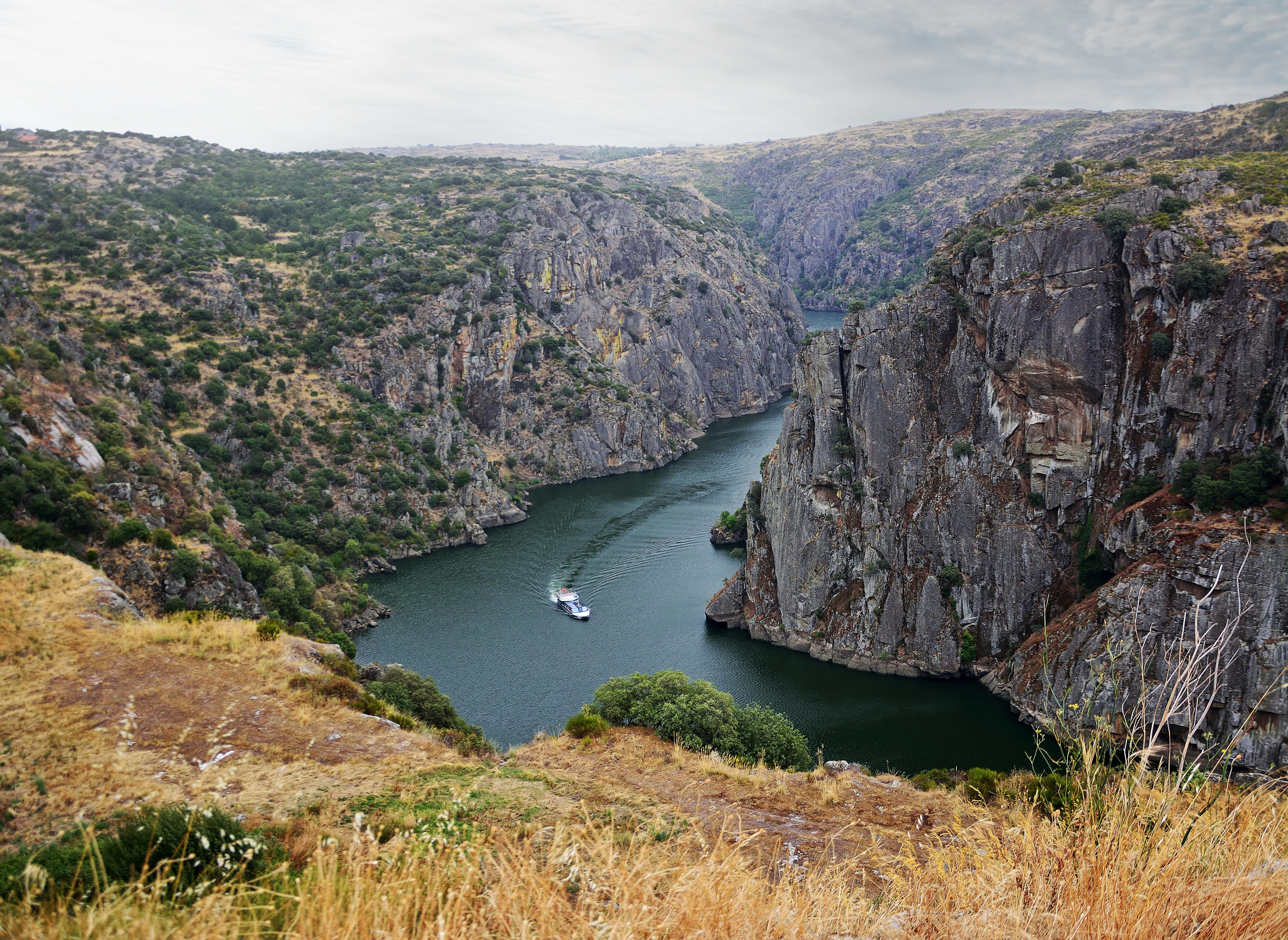
A Douro gorge on the Portugal–Spain border

==== United Kingdom ====
- Avon Gorge, Bristol
- Burrington Combe, Somerset
- Cheddar Gorge, Somerset
- Corrieshalloch Gorge, Ullapool
- Ebbor Gorge, Somerset
- Gordale Scar, North Yorkshire
- Winnats Pass, Derbyshire

==== France ====
- Gorges de l'Ardèche, Auvergne-Rhône-Alpes
- Gorges de Daluis, Provence-Alpes-Côte d'Azur
- Gorges du Tarn, Occitanie
- Grands Goulets, Auvergne-Rhône-Alpes
- Verdon Gorge, Alpes-de-Haute-Provence

==== Ukraine ====
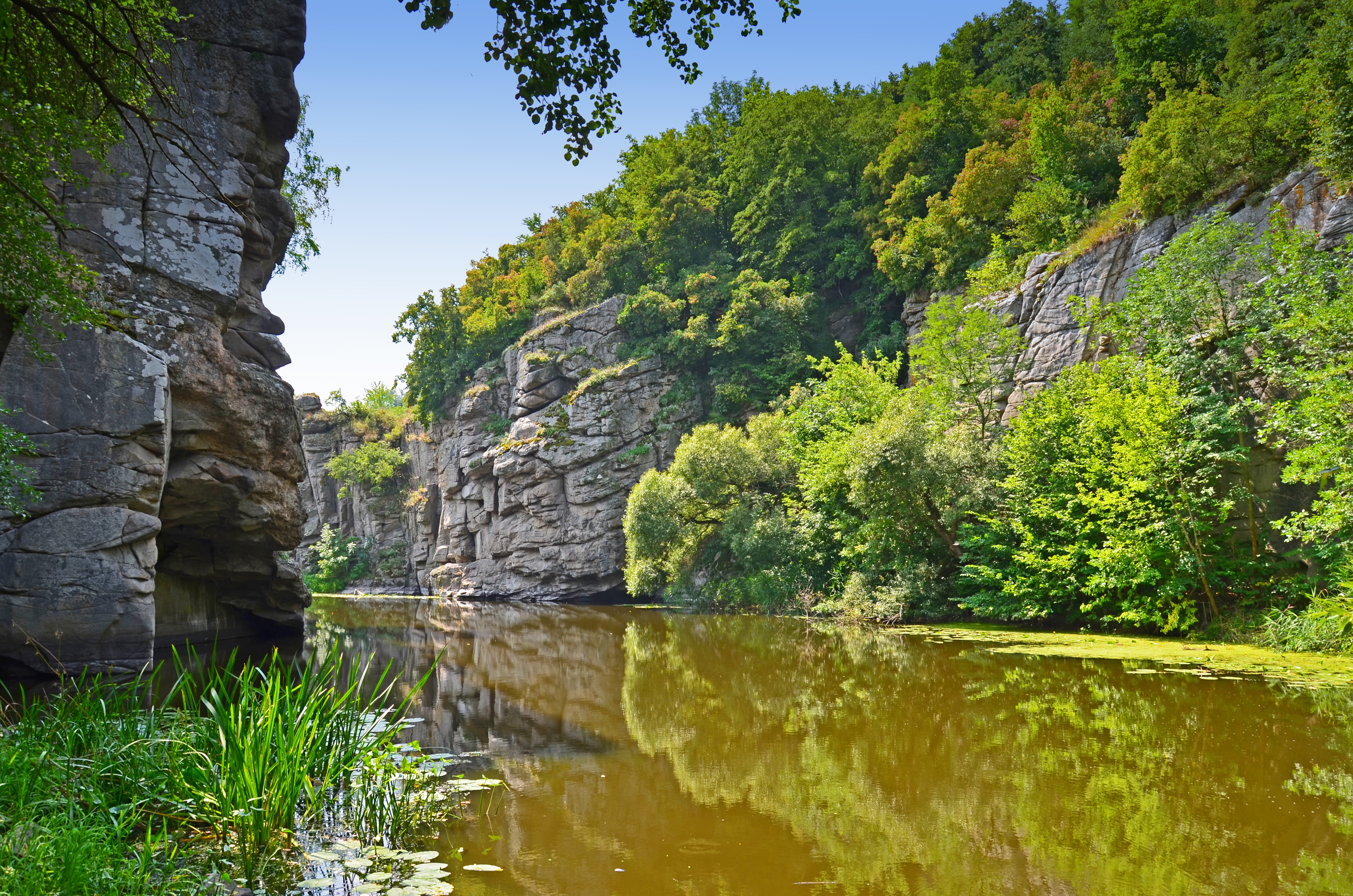
Buky Canyon, Ukraine

- Aktove canyon
- Buky Canyon
- Dniester Canyon

==== Others ====
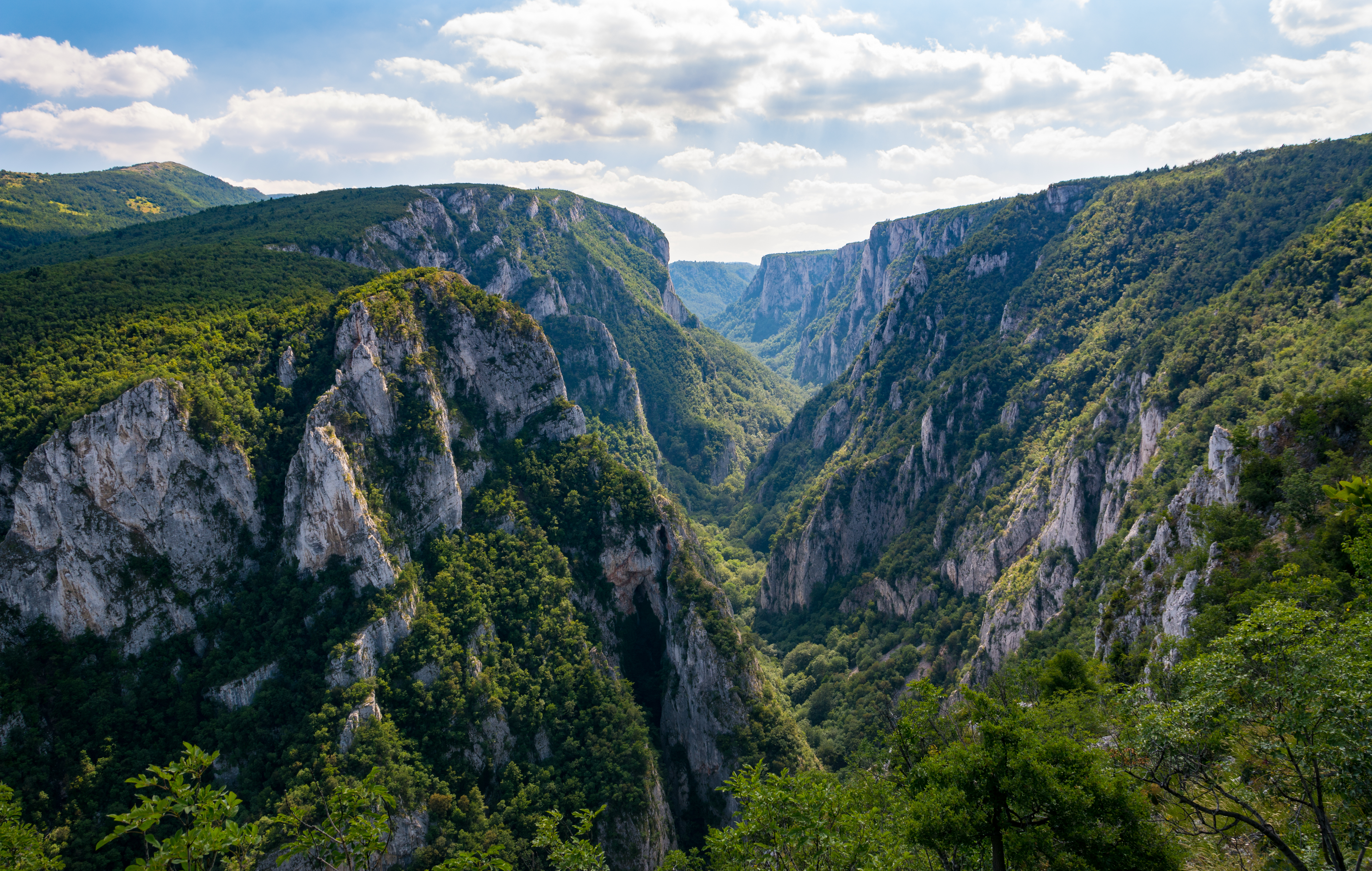
Lazar's Canyon, Serbia

- Albania – Osum Canyon, Kanionet e Skraparit
- Albania/Montenegro – Cem
- Bosnia and Herzegovina – Rakitnica, Drina, Neretva, Vrbas, Unac, Čude, Ugar, Prača,
- Bulgaria – Trigrad Gorge, Kresna Gorge, Iskar Gorge
- Finland – Korouoma Canyon, Kevo Canyon
- Germany – Partnach Gorge
- Greece – Vikos Gorge, Samaria Gorge
- Greenland – Greenland's Grand Canyon
- Iceland – Fjaðrárgljúfur Canyon
- Kosovo – Rugova Canyon, White Drin Canyon, Kacanik Gorge
- North Macedonia – Matka Canyon
- Montenegro – Morača, Piva
- Montenegro/Bosnia and Herzegovina – Tara River Canyon
- Montenegro/Serbia – Ibar
- Norway – Sautso Canyon
- Poland/Slovakia – Dunajec River Gorge
- Russia – Sulak Canyon, Dagestan
- Serbia – Lazar's Canyon
- Serbia/Bosnia and Herzegovina – Lim
- Serbia/Romania – Iron Gates
- Slovenia – Vintgar Gorge
- Switzerland – Aare Gorge

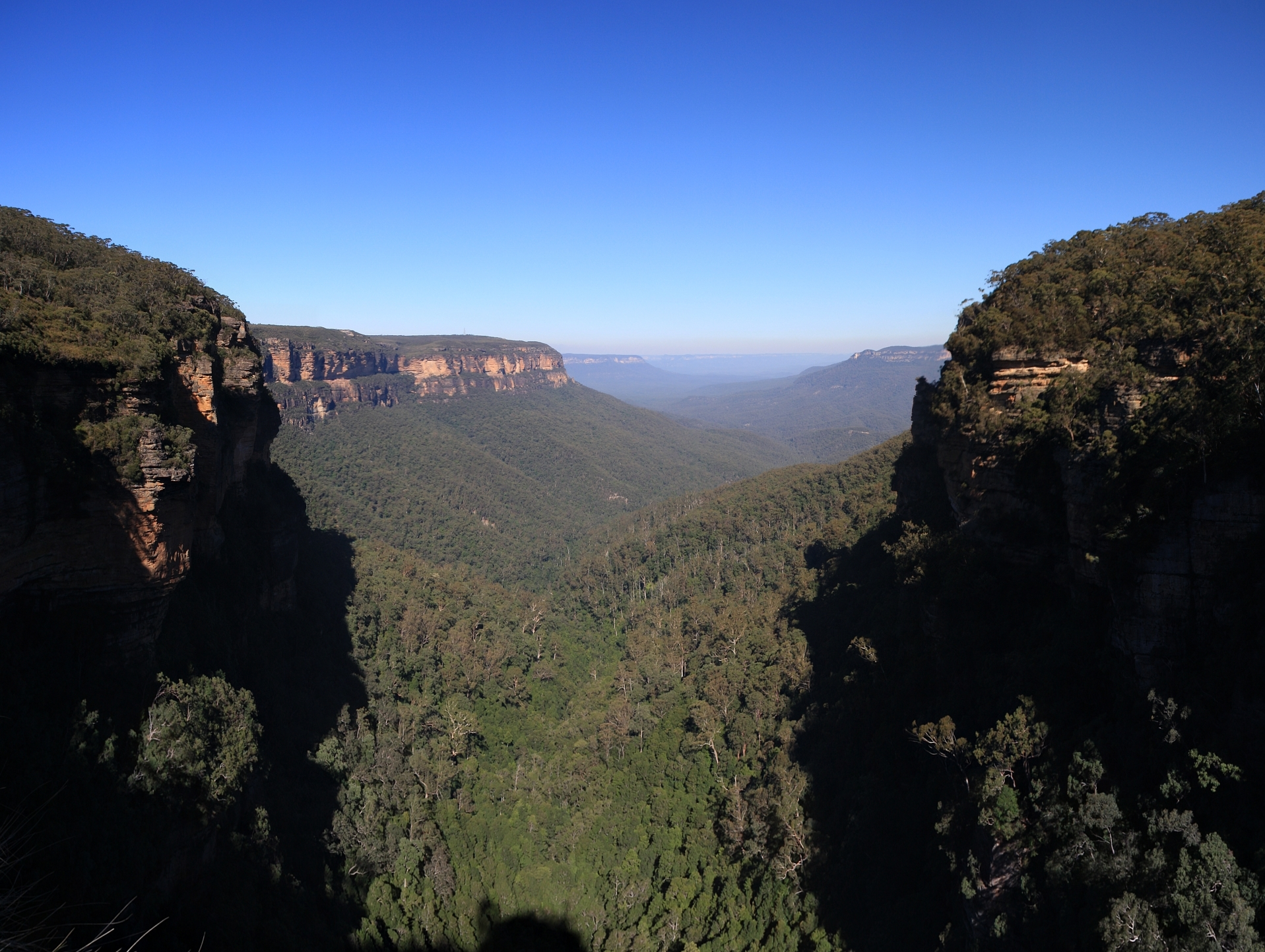
Jamison Valley, Blue Mountains National Park, Australia

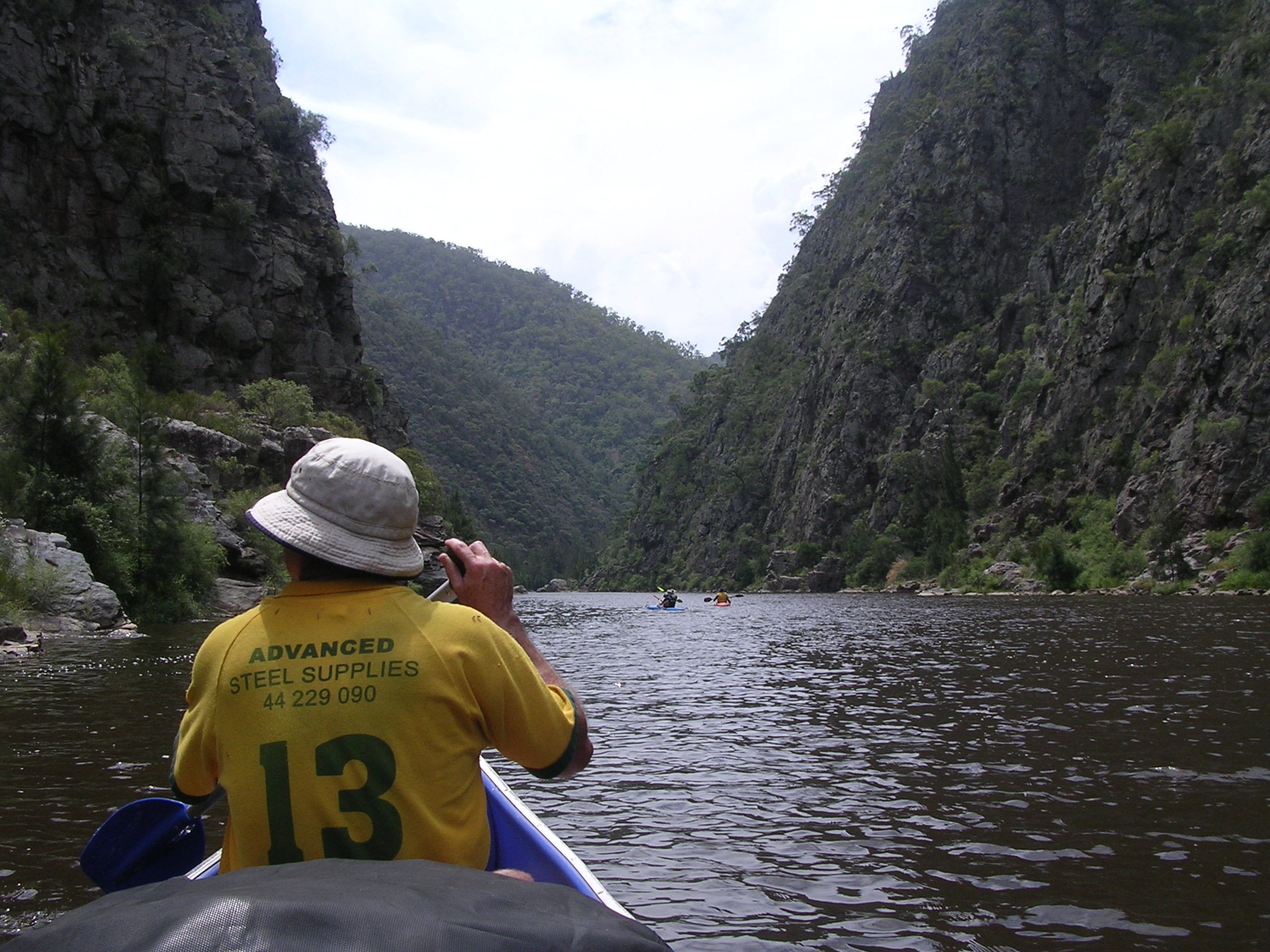
Shoalhaven River Gorge, New South Wales

=== Oceania ===
==== Australia ====
- Joffre Gorge, Karijini National Park, Western Australia
- Katherine Gorge, Northern Territory
- Kings Canyon, Northern Territory
- Murchison River Gorge, Western Australia
- Jamison Valley, New South Wales
- Capertee Valley, New South Wales – the world's second-widest canyon
- Shoalhaven Gorge, New South Wales
- Werribee Gorge, Victoria
- The Slot Canyons of the Blue Mountains, New South Wales

==== New Zealand ====
- Manawatū Gorge, North Island
- Skippers Canyon, South Island

=== Solar System ===
- Ithaca Chasma on Saturn's moon Tethys
- Valles Marineris on Mars, the largest-known canyon in the Solar System
- Vid Flumina on Saturn's largest moon Titan is the only known liquid-floored canyon in the Solar System besides Earth
- Messina Chasmata on Uranus' moon Titania

Venus has many craters and canyons on its surface. The troughs on the planet are part of a system of canyons that is more than 6,400 km long.

== See also ==
- Antecedent drainage stream – Stream maintaining its original course despite changes in underlying rocks
- Canyoning – Traveling in canyons using a variety of techniques
- Chine – Steep-sided coastal gorge in central southern England
- Draw (terrain) – Long area of downward-sloping low ground
- Geomorphology – Scientific study of landforms
- Gully – Landform created by running water and/or mass movement eroding sharply into soil
- Sinkhole – Geologically-formed topological depression
- Steephead valley – Landform
- Valley – Low area between hills, often with a river running through it
