= Harker Canyon (Tooele County, Utah) =

Canyon in Tooele County, Utah, United States

Coordinates: 39°59′27″N 112°28′20″W

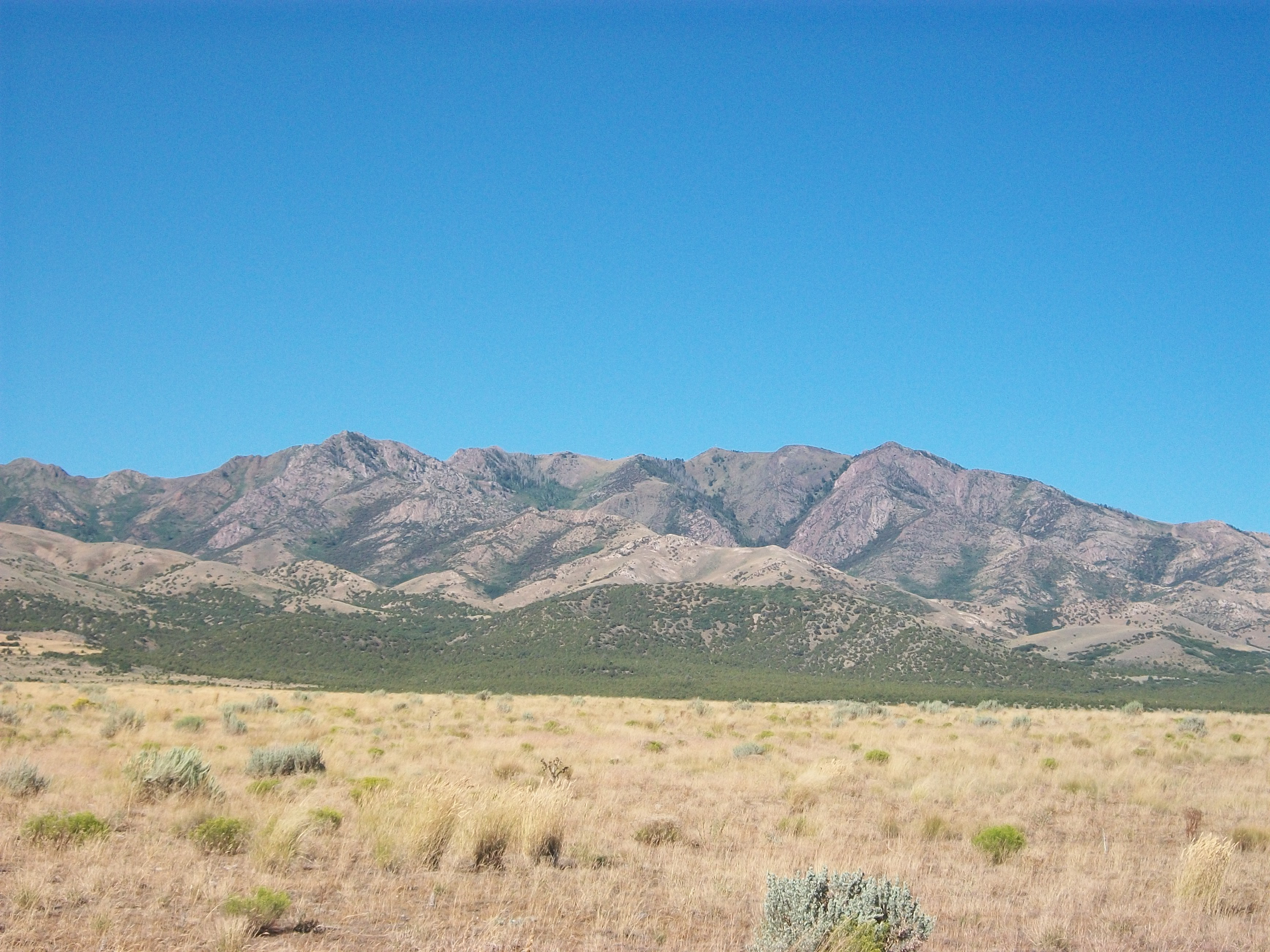
Approaching Harker Canyon, 2010

Harker Canyon is a canyon in southeastern Tooele County, Utah, United States, about 10 km (6.2 mi) south of the town of Vernon.

== Description ==
The canyon is oriented east-west on the southern side of the Sheeprock Mountains, a small mountain group in the larger Wasatch Range. The canyon is entirely encompassed by the boundaries of the Uinta-Wasatch-Cache National Forest, and is accessible from Harker Road by a forest road designated NF 586. There are many abandoned mines in the canyon. Bird watching and horseback riding are popular recreational activities in the canyon.

== History ==
Harker Canyon has been extensively mined for hard minerals. Artifacts of a ghost town and abandoned mining operations below a natural spring remain. Management of the old mines is assigned to the Vernon Sheeprocks Project, a joint project managed by the United States Forest Service, the United States Department of Agriculture, the United States Department of the Interior, and the Utah Department of Natural Resources. In a report issued in January, 2005, Harker Canyon was singled out as having the highest concentrations of heavy metals in its groundwater of any sampled area in the Sheeprock Mountains. Harker Canyon is located in the Utah Division of Wildlife Resources Wildlife Management Unit 19B.

== Geography ==
Harker Canyon is about 3.1 mi (5.0 km) long. The road entrance to the canyon at its eastern end is at approximately 6,300 feet (1,900 m) elevation, and the top of the canyon at its western end is at about 8,800 feet (2,700 m) elevation. A natural spring can be found in the canyon at 7,400 feet (2,300 m) elevation, which flows into Harker Creek. Vegetation in the canyon is principally a pinyon-juniper woodland.

== See also ==
- List of canyons and gorges in Utah
