= Crystal Canyon =

Crystal Canyon may refer to:

== Places ==
- Crystal Canyon (Utah), a small canyon in the western slopes of the East Tintic Mountains in Juab County, Utah, United States
- A feature of the Grand Canyon, Arizona
- A canyon in Colorado; see South Fork Crystal River

== Entertainment ==
- Crystal Canyon Studio, co-founded by Knut Schreiner
- "Crystal Canyon", a song by Irish band God Is an Astronaut from the 2006 album A Moment of Stillness
- "Crystal Canyon", an episode of the 1985 TV series Thundercats
