= Butterfield Canyon =

Butterfield Canyon may refer to:

- Butterfield Canyon, a canyon in the Angeles National Forest in Los Angeles County, California, United States, near the San Gabriel Reservoir
- Butterfield Canyon, a canyon in the Unorganized Borough, Alaska, United States, north of the city of Nome
- Butterfield Canyon, a canyon in the southern Coke County, Texas, United States, north of the city of San Angelo
- Butterfield Canyon (Utah), a canyon in the Oquirrh Mountains in southwest Salt Lake County, Utah, United States
  - Left Hand Fork Butterfield Canyon
