= Daves Hollow =

Canyon in Utah, United States

Coordinates: 37.6863703°N 112.2023919°W

Daves Hollow is a canyon in southeastern Garfield County, Utah, United States.

The hollow is located on the Paunsaugunt Plateau, almost entirely in Dixie National Forest, but extends slightly into the western edge of Bryce Canyon National Park (just northwest of the park's visitor center). It derives its name from David O. Littlefield, a local shepherd. An unnamed stream flows northwest through the length of the hollow, and then north into the Emery Valley before emptying into the Sevier River.

== See also ==
- List of canyons and gorges in Utah
