= Wolverine Canyon =

Coordinates: 37°45′30″N 111°15′34″W

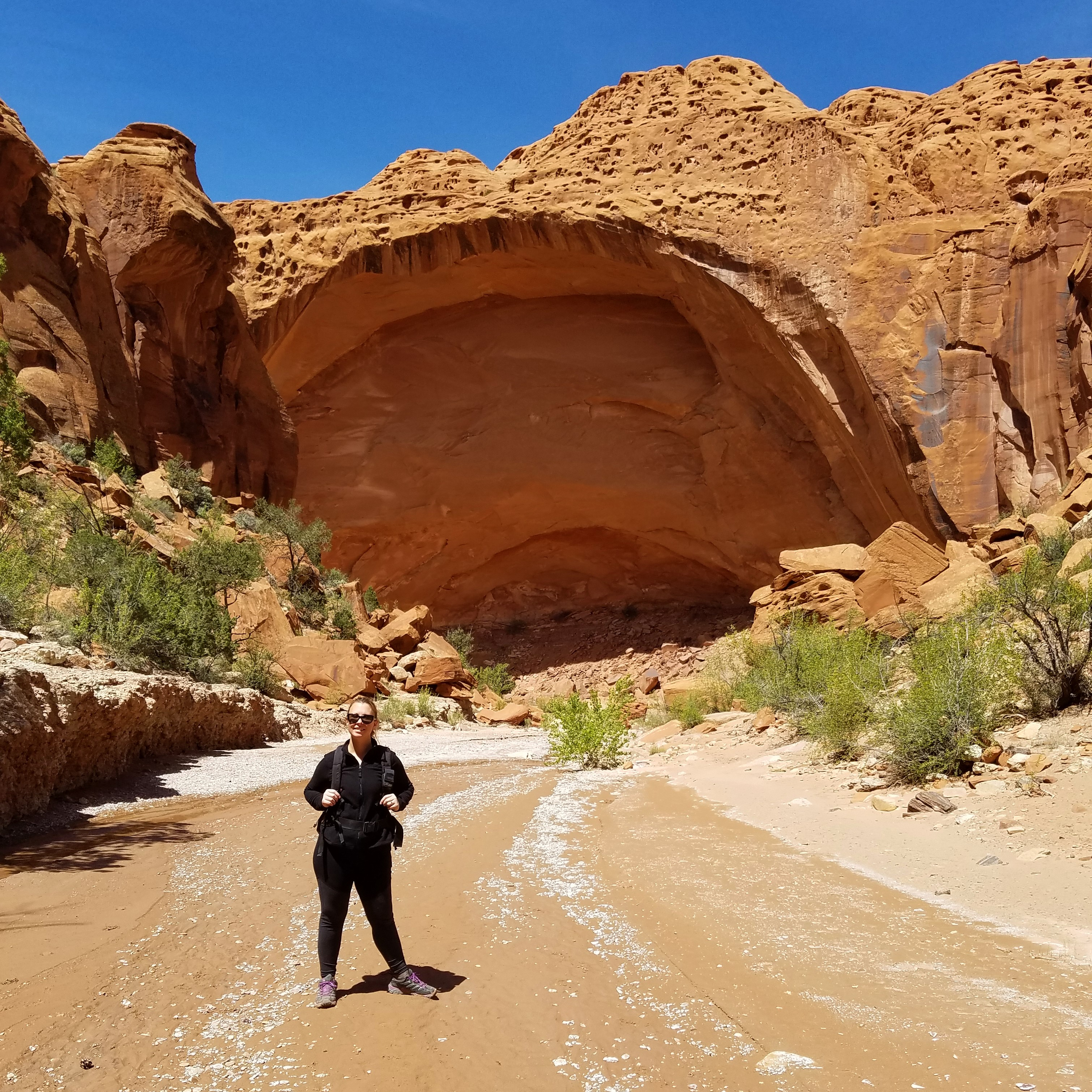
Golden Gate in Wolverine Canyon, Escalante National Monument Utah with female hiker in foreground

Wolverine Canyon is a canyon near the town of Boulder, Utah. It is small, only 3 miles in length until it meets with Horse Canyon and Little Death Hollow, and then leads down to the Escalante River.
