= Crystal Canyon (Utah) =

Coordinates: 39°52′46″N 112°05′24″W

Crystal Canyon is a canyon on the northeastern edge of Juab County, Utah, United States.

== Description ==
The short, fairly steep canyon (spanning only about 1.25 miles (2.01 km) from head to mouth) is located on the northeast base of Sunrise Peak on the western slopes of the East Tintic Mountains. The head of the canyon is on the Juab‑Utah county line at an elevation of 7,400 feet (2,300 m). The canyon runs northwest‑southeast. The mouth is at the head of Diamond Gulch, on the east side of the ghost town of Diamond, at an elevation of 6,398 feet (1,950 m). An unnamed intermittent stream flows the length of the canyon.

Crystal Canyon was so named for worthless deposits of crystals which were initially believed to be diamonds.

== See also ==
- List of canyons and gorges in Utah
