= Horse Canyon (Garfield County, Utah) =

Coordinates: 37°43′08″N 111°15′59″W

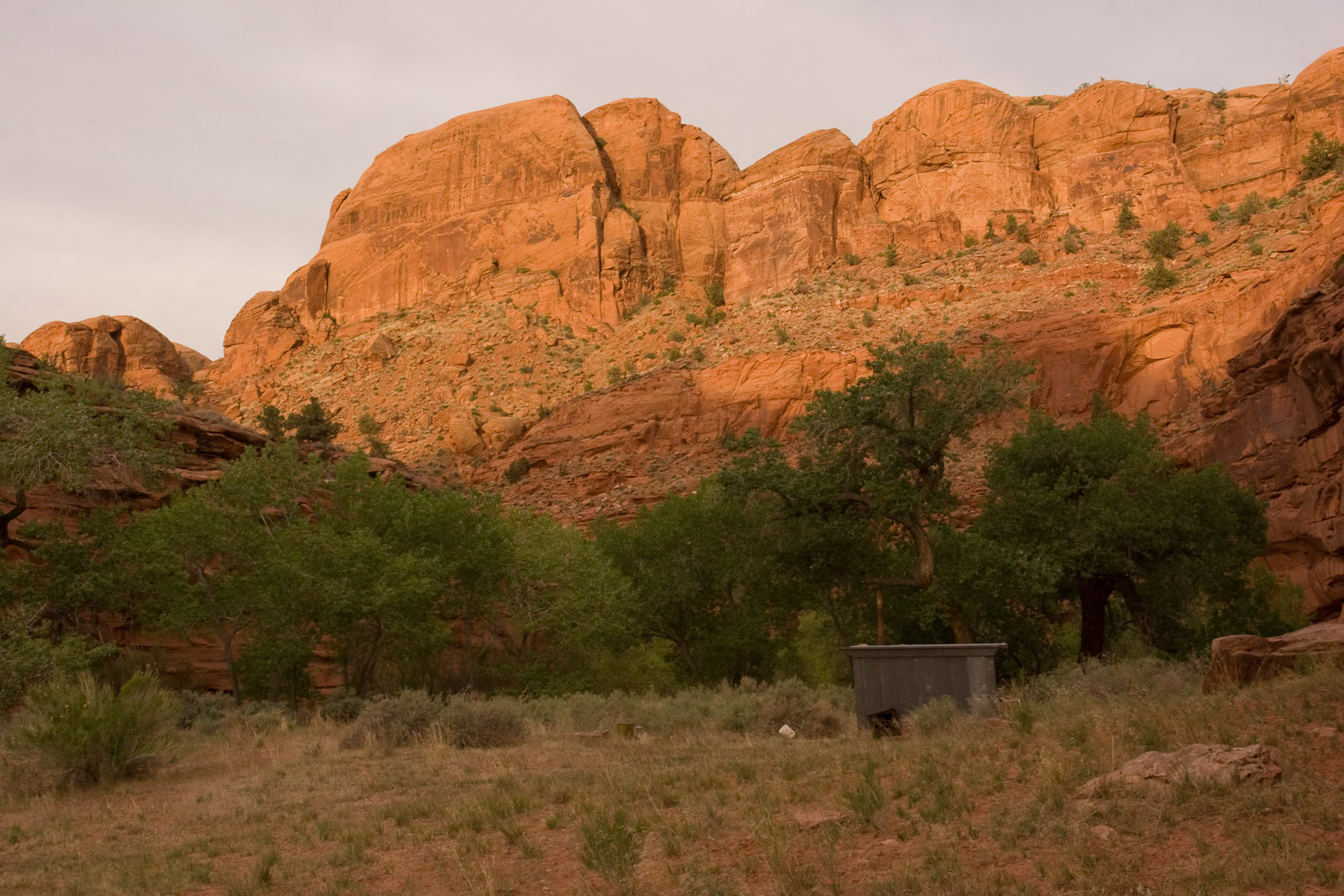
Campsite in Horse Canyon, May 2006

Horse Canyon is a small canyon near the towns of Boulder and Escalante in the Grand Staircase–Escalante National Monument in central Garfield County, Utah, United States

== Description ==
The canyon is one of the three canyons which meet at a fork and turn into Horse Canyon, which is followed down to the Escalante River. Death Hollow meets up with Horse Canyon about 5 miles (8.0 km) in. Wolverine Canyon meets with Horse Canyon about 3.5 miles (5.6 km) in.

== See also ==
- List of canyons and gorges in Utah
