= The Walls of Jericho (canyon) =

Preserved nature area in Tennessee and Alabama, US

Walls of Jericho
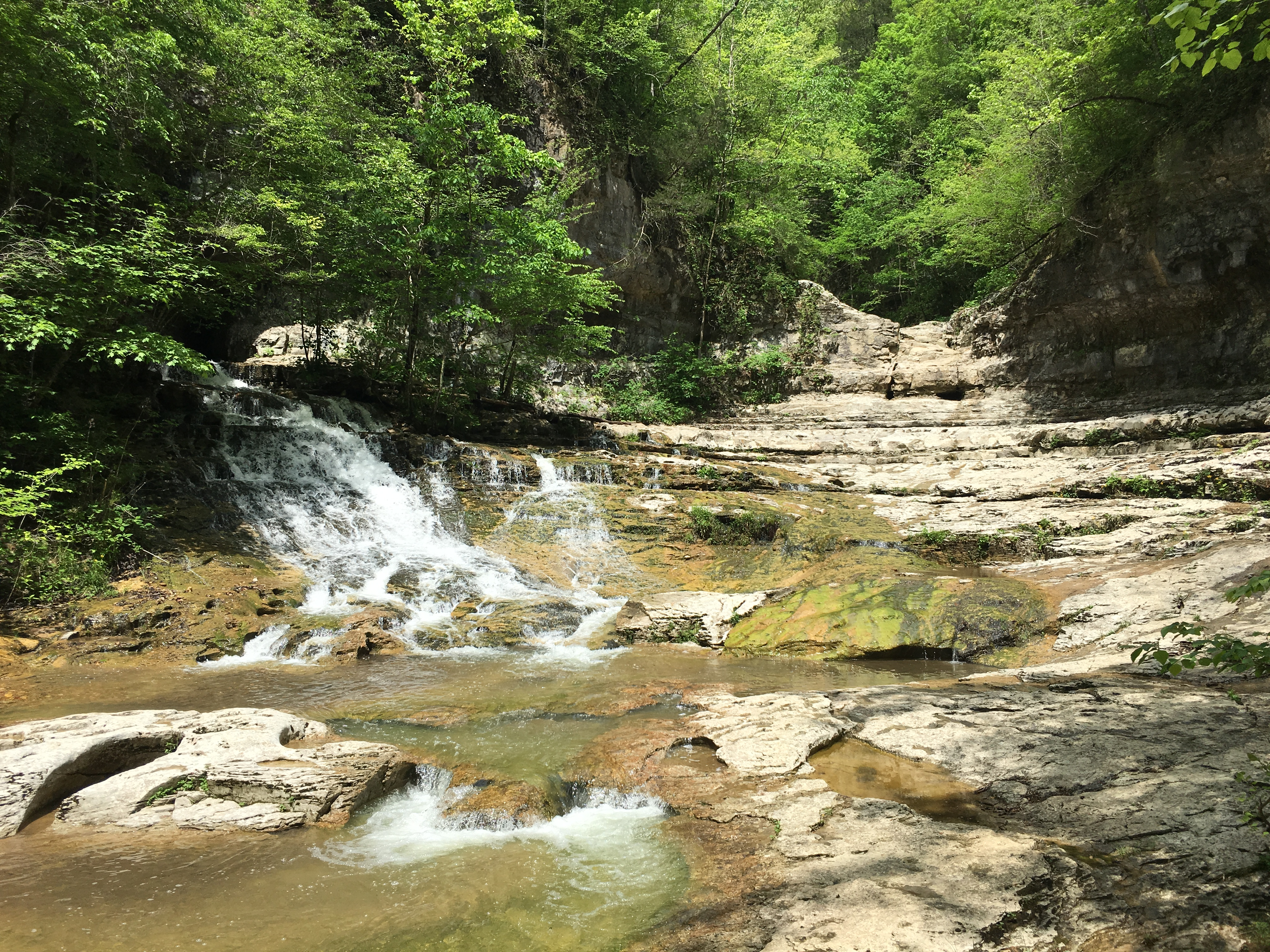
- Lower falls at the Walls of Jericho

- Location within Tennessee
- Location: Tennessee and Alabama, United States
- Coordinates: 34.99004°N 86.10295°W
- Area: 750 acres (300 ha)
- Designated: 2006
- Governing body: Tennessee Wildlife Resources Agency
- Website: Walls of Jericho Class II Natural-Scientific State Natural Area

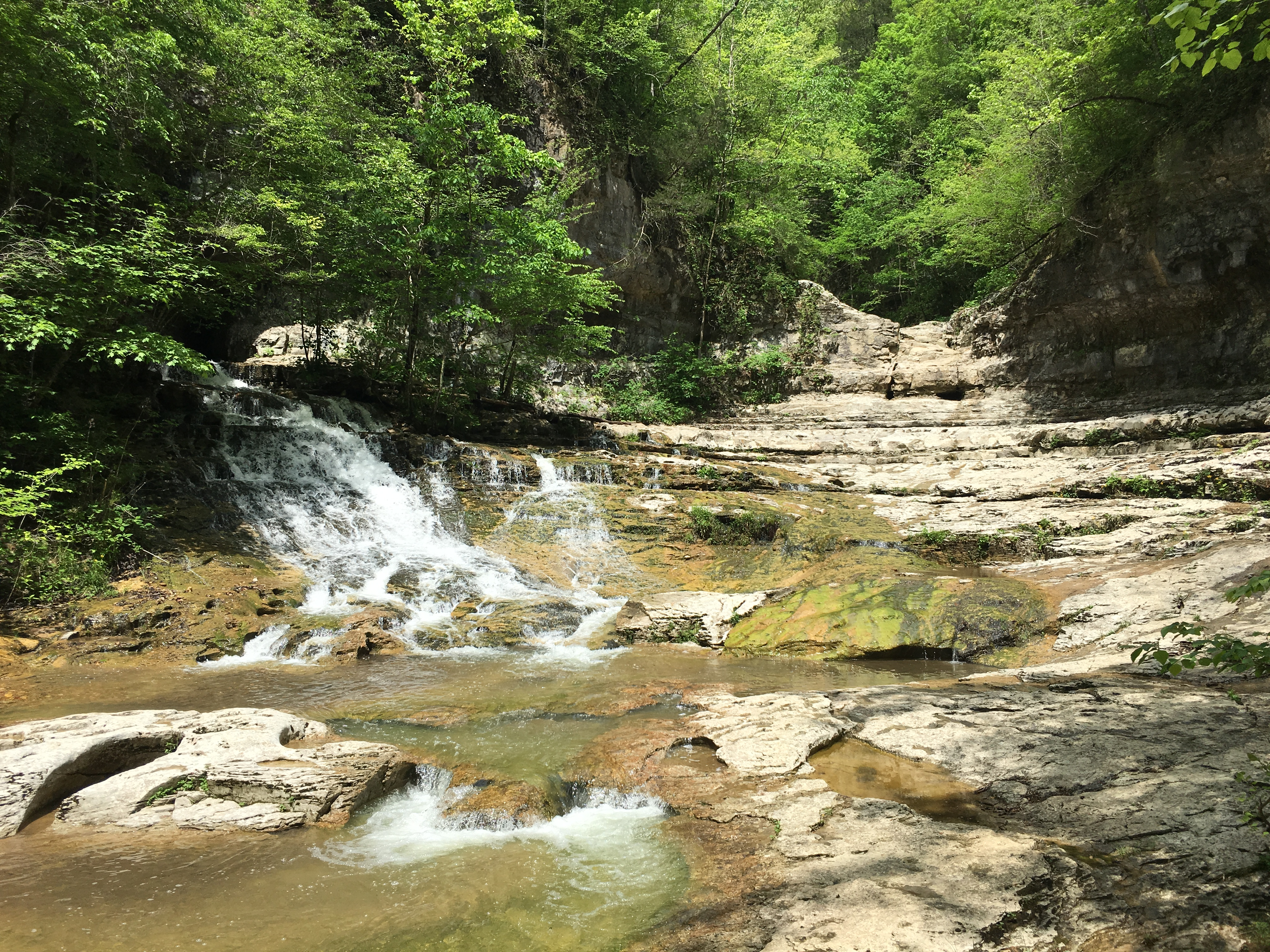
Lower falls at the Walls of Jericho

The Walls of Jericho is a 750-acre (300 ha) natural area that is within the 8,943-acre (3,619 ha) Bear Hollow Mountain Wildlife Management Area (WMA) in Tennessee, which is contiguous to the Skyline WMA in Alabama. It was designated in 2016 and is owned by State of Tennessee. Both of the public lands on the Tennessee and Alabama side total 21,453 acres (8,682 ha). The initiative to acquire this land was a lengthy project completed by The Nature Conservancy in Tennessee and Alabama. The natural area is approximately twelve miles south of Winchester in southern Franklin County.

The southern boundary of the natural area follows the Alabama–Tennessee state line where the actual "Walls of Jericho" is located.

== History ==
Legend claims that in the late 1700s Davy Crockett explored this area when his family owned land nearby. An itinerant preacher who made his way to the Walls of Jericho in the late 1800s and performed baptisms here gave it a biblical name. The Walls of Jericho area was originally owned by the Texas oil magnate Harry Lee Carter, who acquired 60,000 acres (24,000 ha) in Franklin County, Tennessee, and Jackson County, Alabama, in the 1940s.

For years, up until 1977 when the Walls of Jericho were closed to the public, the Tennessee property had been open to the public for recreational use and managed by the Tennessee Wildlife Resources Agency.

The Carter Lands region lies in the heart of the Southern Cumberlands and totals 60,000 acres.

== Geography ==
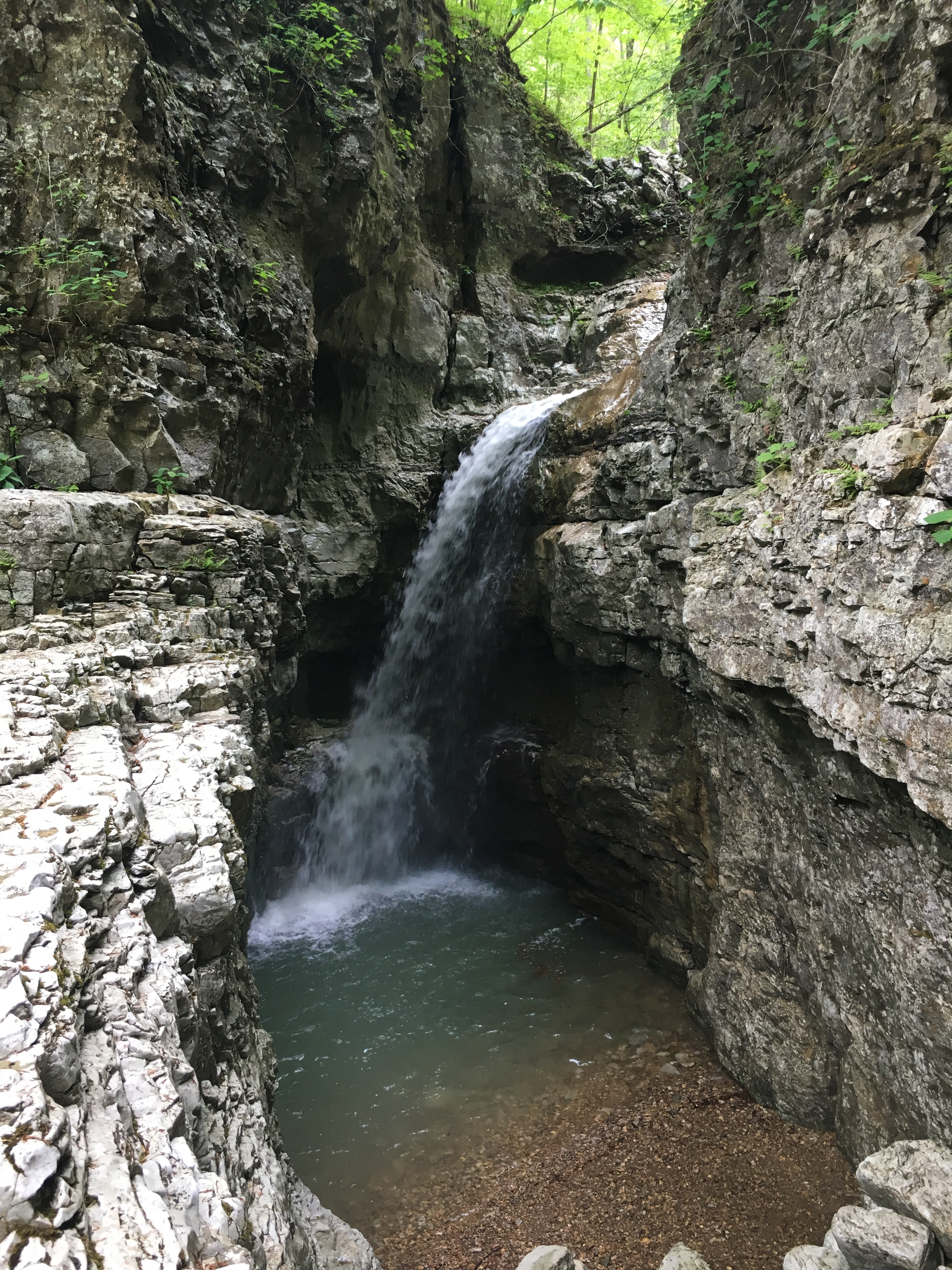
Upper falls

The "Walls" is an impressive geological feature that forms a large bowl shaped amphitheater. Embedded in the limestone are bowling ball size holes from which water drips and spouts, creating a unique water feature. This amphitheater gives rise to steep 200-foot (61 m) sheer rock walls that creates the natural feature defining the amphitheater. Turkey Creek drains through the "Walls" and has been an active geological force in creating the amphitheater.

== Biology ==
The natural area forest includes maples, oaks, hickories, tulip tree, American beech, eastern red cedar, and many other plants commonly associated with limestone. The forestland beyond the "Walls" feature is noteworthy with its many bluffs, large rock outcroppings, caves, and sinkholes. Not only is the "Walls" significant as a geological feature, the natural area is also important because of its biological richness. The Turkey Creek drainage, which bisects the natural area from north to south, supports the state endangered rare limerock arrowwood (Viburnum bracteatum). This is one of only three known occurrences in the state. Other rare species occur in the Turkey Creek watershed. The protection of Turkey Creek also helps protect downstream the Upper Paint Rock watershed where numerous rare mussel and fish species occur in the Paint Rock River.

== Access ==
The Walls of Jericho is a popular hiking and camping spot. A 7-mile (11 km) strenuous hiking trail connects the Tennessee and Alabama trailheads. A primitive campsite is located halfway in at the bottom of the canyon.
