= Stillwater Canyon =

- Stillwater Cañon
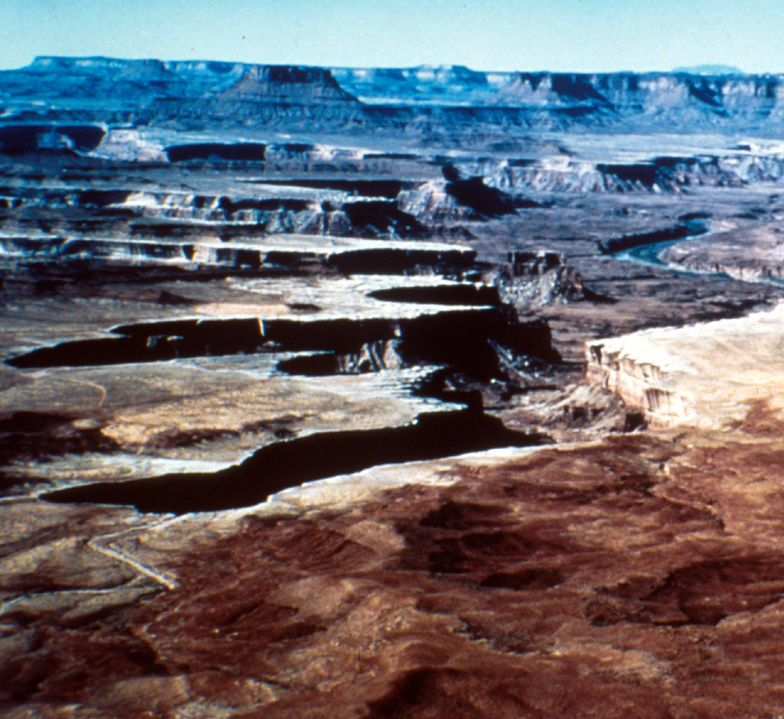
- View from above Stillwater Canyon, early 1970s photograph

- Location within Utah Location within the United States
- Floor elevation: 3,875 feet (1,181 m)
- Long-axis direction: North–south

Geography
- Location: Canyonlands National Park
- Country: United States
- State: Utah
- Districts: Wayne County; San Juan County
- Borders on: White Rim
- Coordinates: 38°11′23″N 109°53′12″W
- River: Green River
- Interactive map of Stillwater Canyon

Stillwater Canyon is a long winding canyon along the Green River in Canyonlands National Park on the border line between Wayne and San Juan counties in southeastern Utah, United States.

== Description ==
The canyon begins at Bonita Bend in the central part of the National Park. From its head, the canyon follows the meanders of the Green River, immediately west of the White Rim (cliff), in a southerly direction until the canyon reaches the mouth of both itself and the Green River at the river's confluence with the Colorado River in the southeastern area of the National Park.

== See also ==
- List of canyons and gorges in Utah
