= Croton Canyon =

Coordinates: 37.1638782°N 111.3034901°W

Croton Canyon is a valley in Kane County, Utah, United States.

The valley may have taken its name from a native pant such as croton tiglium.
