= Death Hollow =

Slot canyon in Utah, United States

Coordinates: 37°44′20″N 111°15′22″W

Death Hollow, March 2006

Death Hollow, Death Canyon or Little Death Hollow is a slot canyon in the Grand Staircase–Escalante National Monument in central Garfield County, Utah, United States.

It is located on the East side of the Escalante River southeast of the town of Escalante, Utah. Not to be confused with the much longer and deeper Death Hollow upstream and directly to the east of the town.

== Description ==
The 8-mile (13 km) canyon is located southeast of the town of Boulder and is popular with hikers. It is a side canyon of Horse Canyon, which continues on to the Escalante River.

== See also ==
- List of canyons and gorges in Utah
- Canyons of the Escalante
