= Butterfield Canyon (Utah) =

Canyon in the Oquirrh Mountains, Utah, United States

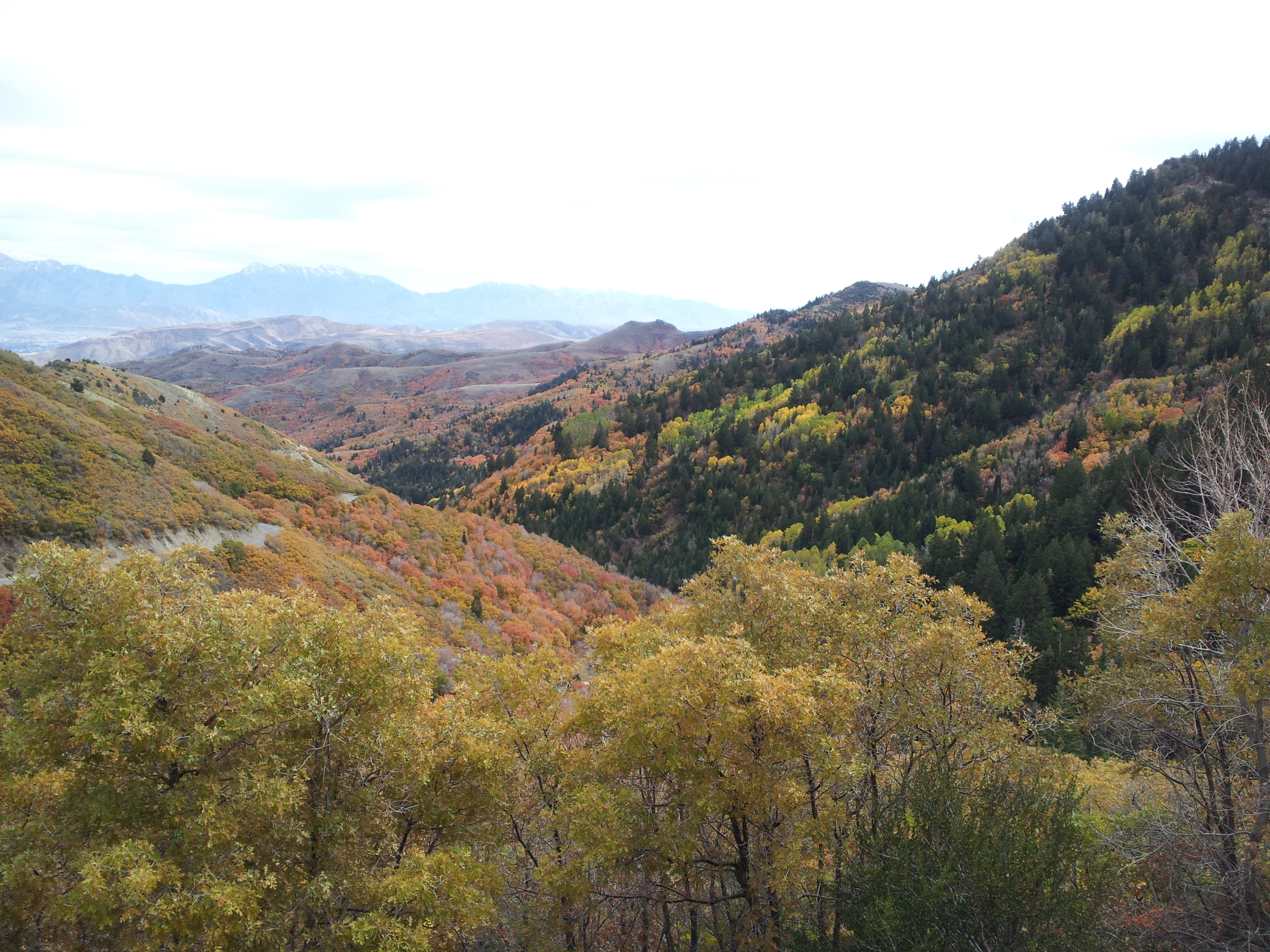
- Fall in Butterfield Canyon, October 2011

- Location within Utah
- Floor elevation: 9,180 ft (2,800 m)

Geology
- Type: Canyon

Geography
- Location: Oquirrh Mountains, Salt Lake County
- Country: United States
- State: Utah
- Coordinates: 40°30′47″N 112°04′33″W
- Interactive map of Butterfield Canyon

Butterfield Canyon is a canyon in the Oquirrh Mountains in southwest Salt Lake County, Utah, United States located just west of the city of Herriman. Locals use this canyon to commute to and from Herriman/Tooele. Butterfield Canyon Road is a recreation road. The canyon was named after Thomas Jefferson Butterfield, the founder of Herriman, Utah.

== Description ==
Butterfield Canyon contains a paved road owned by Kennecott Utah Copper (Butterfield Canyon Road - closed Nov 1 to June 1). Butterfield Canyon road climbs to a summit of 9,180 feet (2,800 m) above sea level. Past the summit, when it becomes Middle Canyon Road on the Tooele County side of the mountain, there is a 1.5-mile (2.4 km) portion that is well-maintained dirt. When roads on both sides of the mountain are open, they connect the city of Tooele with Herriman.

The canyon was discovered in 1851 when Thomas Butterfield & Samuel Egbert, two men from West Jordan, were searching for an area to raise livestock and their families and found a stream of water flowing from a canyon. This canyon was later named Butterfield Canyon, and the settlement was called the Butterfield Settlement, now called Herriman.

Butterfield Canyon Elementary School is located near the canyon.

At night, the mouth of the canyon is a beautiful area as large herds of deer move into the farmlands for feeding.

It's also been said that fossils are found along the canyon, including coral.

== See also ==
- List of canyons and gorges in Utah
