= List of physiographic regions =

Overview of Earth's physiographic regions

The landforms of Earth are generally divided into physiographic regions, consisting of physiographic provinces, which in turn consist of physiographic sections, though some others use different terminology, such as realms, regions and subregions. Some areas have further categorized their respective areas into more detailed subsections.

Landmass	Region / Division	Province	Section
Africa	African Alpine System	Atlas Mountains	Mediterranean Atlas
Africa	African Alpine System	Atlas Mountains	Southern Atlas
Africa	African Alpine System	Atlas Mountains	High Interior Plateaus
Africa	African Alpine System	Atlas Mountains	Canary Islands
Africa	African massive	Sahara	Central Sahara Domes
Africa	African massive	Sahara	Encircling Plateaus And Lowlands
Africa	African massive	Sahara	Central Sahara Ergs
Africa	African massive	Sahara	Western Sahara
Africa	African massive	Sahara	Eastern Sahara
Africa	African massive	Sudan	Niger Basin
Africa	African massive	Sudan	Chad Basin
Africa	African massive	Sudan	Middle Nile Basin
Africa	African massive	Mid-African	West Guinea Highlands
Africa	African massive	Mid-African	Guinea Coast
Africa	African massive	Mid-African	Cameroon Mountains
Africa	African massive	Mid-African	Ubangi-Shari Upland
Africa	African massive	Mid-African	South Guinea Highlands
Africa	African massive	Mid-African	Coastal Lowlands
Africa	African massive	Mid-African	Congo Basin
Africa	South African Platform		
Africa	South African Platform	Kalahari Region	Encircling Uplands
Africa	South African Platform	Lunda Swell	
Africa	South African Platform	Matabele Upland	
Africa	South African Platform	Veldt	
Africa	South African Platform	High Karroo	
Africa	South African Platform	Damara-Nama Upland	
Africa	South African Platform	Namib Desert	
Africa	South African Platform	Cape Mountains	
Africa	South African Platform	Natal Terrace Belt	
Africa	South African Platform	Mozambique Plain	
Africa	South African Platform	Madagascar	
Africa	East African Highlands	Rift Valley	Coastal Belt
Africa	East African Highlands	Rift Valley	High Interior Plateau
Africa	East African Highlands	Rift Valley	Western Rift Belt
Africa	East African Highlands	Rift Valley	Eastern Rift Belt
Africa	East African Highlands	Abyssinian	Somali Plateau
Africa	East African Highlands	Abyssinian	Ethiopian Massif
Africa	East African Highlands	Abyssinian	Abyssinian Graben
Africa	East African Highlands	Abyssinian	Etbai Range
Americas	Appalachian	Atlantic Coast Uplands	
Americas	Appalachian	Eastern Newfoundland Atlantic	
Americas	Appalachian	Maritime Acadian Highlands	
Americas	Appalachian	Maritime Plain	
Americas	Appalachian	Notre Dame and Mégantic Mountains	
Americas	Appalachian	Western Newfoundland Mountains	Newfoundland Highlands
Americas	Appalachian	Western Newfoundland Mountains	Newfoundland Coastal Lowland
Americas	Appalachian	Piedmont province	Piedmont Upland
Americas	Appalachian	Piedmont province	Piedmont Lowlands
Americas	Appalachian	Blue Ridge province	Northern section
Americas	Appalachian	Blue Ridge province	Southern section
Americas	Appalachian	Valley And Ridge province	Tennessee section
Americas	Appalachian	Valley And Ridge province	Middle section
Americas	Appalachian	Valley And Ridge province	Hudson Valley
Americas	Appalachian	St. Lawrence Valley	Champlain section
Americas	Appalachian	St. Lawrence Valley	Northern section
Americas	Appalachian	Appalachian Plateaus province	Mohawk section
Americas	Appalachian	Appalachian Plateaus province	Catskill section
Americas	Appalachian	Appalachian Plateaus province	Southern New York section
Americas	Appalachian	Appalachian Plateaus province	Allegheny Mountain section
Americas	Appalachian	Appalachian Plateaus province	Kanawha section
Americas	Appalachian	Appalachian Plateaus province	Cumberland Plateau section
Americas	Appalachian	Appalachian Plateaus province	Cumberland Mountain section
Americas	Appalachian	New England province	Seaboard Lowland section
Americas	Appalachian	New England province	New England Upland section
Americas	Appalachian	New England province	White Mountain section
Americas	Appalachian	New England province	Green Mountain section
Americas	Appalachian	New England province	Taconic section
Americas	Arctic Lowlands	Eastern Arctic Lowlands	
Americas	Arctic Lowlands	Western Arctic Lowlands	
Americas	Atlantic Plain	Continental Shelf	
Americas	Atlantic Plain	Coastal Plain	Embayed section
Americas	Atlantic Plain	Coastal Plain	Sea Island section
Americas	Atlantic Plain	Coastal Plain	Floridian section
Americas	Atlantic Plain	Coastal Plain	East Gulf Coastal Plain
Americas	Atlantic Plain	Coastal Plain	Mississippi Alluvial Plain
Americas	Atlantic Plain	Coastal Plain	West Gulf Coastal Plain
Americas	Atlantic Plain	Coastal Plain	Gulf Coast Plain And Yucatan Peninsula
Americas	Canadian Shield	Laurentian Upland	Superior Upland
Americas	Canadian Shield	Adirondack province	
Americas	Canadian Shield	Kazan	
Americas	Canadian Shield	Davis	
Americas	Canadian Shield	Hudson	Hudson Bay Lowlands
Americas	Canadian Shield	James	
Americas	Innuitian Region	Eastern High Arctic Glacier	
Americas	Innuitian Region	Western High Arctic	
Americas	Interior Highlands	Ozark Plateaus	Springfield-Salem Plateaus
Americas	Interior Highlands	Ozark Plateaus	Boston Mountains
Americas	Interior Highlands	Ouachita province	Arkansas Valley
Americas	Interior Highlands	Ouachita province	Ouachita Mountains
Americas	Interior Plains	Interior Low Plateaus	Highland Rim section
Americas	Interior Plains	Interior Low Plateaus	Lexington Plain
Americas	Interior Plains	Interior Low Plateaus	Nashville Basin
Americas	Interior Plains	Great Plains	Missouri Plateau, Glaciated
Americas	Interior Plains	Great Plains	Missouri Plateau, Unglaciated
Americas	Interior Plains	Great Plains	Black Hills
Americas	Interior Plains	Great Plains	High Plains
Americas	Interior Plains	Great Plains	Plains Border
Americas	Interior Plains	Great Plains	Arctic Coastal Plain
Americas	Interior Plains	Great Plains	Colorado Piedmont
Americas	Interior Plains	Great Plains	Raton section
Americas	Interior Plains	Great Plains	Pecos Valley
Americas	Interior Plains	Great Plains	Edwards Plateau
Americas	Interior Plains	Great Plains	Central Texas section
Americas	Interior Plains	Central Lowland	Dissected Till Plains
Americas	Interior Plains	Central Lowland	Eastern Lake section
Americas	Interior Plains	Central Lowland	Osage Plains
Americas	Interior Plains	Central Lowland	Till Plains
Americas	Interior Plains	Central Lowland	Western Lake section
Americas	Interior Plains	Central Lowland	Wisconsin Driftless section
Americas	Interior Plains	Mackenzie Delta	Mackenzie River
Americas	Interior Plains	Mackenzie Delta	Yukon Coastal Plain
Americas	Interior Plains	Manitoba Lowlands	
Americas	Interior Plains	Northern Boreal Plains	Great Slave Plain
Americas	Interior Plains	Northern Boreal Plains	Great Bear Plain
Americas	Interior Plains	Northern Boreal Plains	Anderson Plain
Americas	Interior Plains	Northern Boreal Plains	Peel Plain And Plateau
Americas	Interior Plains	Northern Boreal Plains	Colville Hills
Americas	Interior Plains	Prairie Grasslands	Alberta Plain
Americas	Interior Plains	Prairie Grasslands	Saskatchewan Hills
Americas	Interior Plains	Southern Boreal Plains And Plateaus	Alberta Plateau
Americas	Interior Plains	Southern Boreal Plains And Plateaus	Saskatchewan Plain
Americas	Intermontane Plateaus	Columbia Plateau	Walla Walla Plateau
Americas	Intermontane Plateaus	Columbia Plateau	Blue Mountain section
Americas	Intermontane Plateaus	Columbia Plateau	Payette section
Americas	Intermontane Plateaus	Columbia Plateau	Snake River Plain
Americas	Intermontane Plateaus	Columbia Plateau	Harney section
Americas	Intermontane Plateaus	Colorado Plateaus	High Plateaus Of Utah
Americas	Intermontane Plateaus	Colorado Plateaus	Uinta Basin
Americas	Intermontane Plateaus	Colorado Plateaus	Canyon Lands
Americas	Intermontane Plateaus	Colorado Plateaus	Navajo section
Americas	Intermontane Plateaus	Colorado Plateaus	Grand Canyon section
Americas	Intermontane Plateaus	Colorado Plateaus	Datil-Mogollon Section
Americas	Intermontane Plateaus	Colorado Plateaus	Acoma-Zuni Section
Americas	Intermontane Plateaus	Basin And Range Province	Great Basin
Americas	Intermontane Plateaus	Basin And Range Province	Mojave Desert—Mojave Ranges
Americas	Intermontane Plateaus	Basin And Range Province	Salton Trough—Colorado Desert Ranges
Americas	Intermontane Plateaus	Basin And Range Province	Sonoran Desert—Sonoran Desert Ranges
Americas	Intermontane Plateaus	Basin And Range Province	Mexican Highland
Americas	Intermontane Plateaus	Basin And Range Province	Sacramento section
Americas	Intermontane Plateaus	Basin And Range Province	Mexican Altiplano
Americas	Intermontane Plateaus	Northern Plateaus	Interior Plateau
Americas	Intermontane Plateaus	Yukon-Tanana Uplands	Yukon Plateau
Americas	Intermontane Plateaus	Yukon-Tanana Uplands	Cassiar Mountains
Americas	Intermontane Plateaus	Yukon-Tanana Uplands	Skeena Mountains
Americas	Intermontane Plateaus	Yukon-Tanana Uplands	Liard Plain
Americas	Intermontane Plateaus	Yukon-Tanana Uplands	Hyland Plateau
Americas	Intermontane Plateaus	Yukon-Tanana Uplands	Pelly Mountains
Americas	Pacific Coast Ranges	Cascade-Sierra Mountains	Northern Cascade Mountains
Americas	Pacific Coast Ranges	Cascade-Sierra Mountains	Middle Cascade Mountains
Americas	Pacific Coast Ranges	Cascade-Sierra Mountains	Southern Cascade Mountains
Americas	Pacific Coast Ranges	Cascade-Sierra Mountains	Sierra Nevada
Americas	Pacific Coast Ranges	Pacific Border province	Aleutian Islands
Americas	Pacific Coast Ranges	Pacific Border province	Boundary Ranges
Americas	Pacific Coast Ranges	Pacific Border province	Puget Trough
Americas	Pacific Coast Ranges	Pacific Border province	Olympic Mountains
Americas	Pacific Coast Ranges	Pacific Border province	Oregon Coast Range
Americas	Pacific Coast Ranges	Pacific Border province	Klamath Mountains
Americas	Pacific Coast Ranges	Pacific Border province	California Trough
Americas	Pacific Coast Ranges	Pacific Border province	California Coast Ranges
Americas	Pacific Coast Ranges	Pacific Border province	Transverse Ranges (Los Angeles Mountains)
Americas	Pacific Coast Ranges	Lower California province	Peninsular Ranges
Americas	Rocky Mountain System	Wyoming Basin	
Americas	Rocky Mountain System	Columbia Mountains	Columbia Highlands
Americas	Rocky Mountain System	Columbia Mountains	Interior Plateau
Americas	Rocky Mountain System	Columbia Mountains	Southern Rocky Mountain Trench
Americas	Rocky Mountain System	Arctic Mountains	Brooks Range
Americas	Rocky Mountain System	Arctic Mountains	Arctic Foothills
Americas	Rocky Mountain System	Northern Rocky Mountains	
Americas	Rocky Mountain System	Middle Rocky Mountains	
Americas	Rocky Mountain System	Southern Rocky Mountains	
Americas	Sierra Madre System	Sierra Madre Occidental	Lava (Rhyolite) Plateau
Americas	Sierra Madre System	Sierra Madre Occidental	Sonoran High Ranges
Americas	Sierra Madre System	Sierra Madre Occidental	Eastern Upland With Basins
Americas	Sierra Madre System	Sierra Madre Oriental	Northern section
Americas	Sierra Madre System	Sierra Madre Oriental	The High Sierra
Americas	Sierra Madre System	Sierra Madre Oriental	Cross Ranges
Americas	Sierra Madre System	Sierra Madre Oriental	Lower Ranges
Americas	Sierra Madre System	Sierra Madre del Sur	Balsas-Mexcala Basin
Americas	Sierra Madre System	Sierra Madre del Sur	Oaxaca Upland
Americas	Sierra Madre System	Sierra Madre del Sur	Northeast Folded Ranges
Americas	Sierra Madre System	Sierra Madre del Sur	Southern Slope
Americas	Sierra Madre System	Sierra Madre del Sur	Northern section
Americas	Sierra Madre System	Trans-Mexican Volcanic Belt	
Americas	Sierra Madre System	Southern Mexican Highlands	
Americas	Baja California Peninsula		Peninsular Ranges
Americas	Baja California Peninsula	Southern Horst	
Americas	Baja California Peninsula	Llano De La Magdalena	
Americas	Baja California Peninsula	Colorado Delta	
Americas	The Buried Ranges	Sonoran Desert	
Americas	The Buried Ranges	Deltas	
Americas	The Buried Ranges	Sinaloa Coast	
Americas	The Buried Ranges	Piedmont Ranges	
Americas	Central Meseta		
Americas	Gulf Coastal Lowland		
Americas	Neovolcanic Plateau		
Americas	Chiapas-Guatemala Highlands		
Americas	Gulf Coast Plain And Yucatan Peninsula	Pitted Lowlands	
Americas	Gulf Coast Plain And Yucatan Peninsula	Yucatan Platform	
Americas	Gulf Coast Plain And Yucatan Peninsula	East Coast	
Americas	Andean Mountain System	Northern Andes	Cordillera Occidental
Americas	Andean Mountain System	Northern Andes	Bolivia, Colombia, Ecuador, Peru
Americas	Andean Mountain System	Northern Andes	Cordillera Central
Americas	Andean Mountain System	Northern Andes	Bolivia, Colombia, Ecuador, Peru
Americas	Andean Mountain System	Northern Andes	Middle Magdalena Basin
Americas	Andean Mountain System	Northern Andes	Maracaibo Basin
Americas	Andean Mountain System	Central Andes	Cordillera Occidental
Americas	Andean Mountain System	Central Andes	Atacama Desert
Americas	Andean Mountain System	Central Andes	Altiplano
Americas	Andean Mountain System	Central Andes	Cordillera Oriental
Americas	Andean Mountain System	Southern Andes	Fuegian Andes
Americas	Andean Mountain System	Southern Andes	Patagonian Andes
Americas	Andean Mountain System	Andean Piedmont	
Americas	Brazilian Highlands	Brazilian Oldland	
Americas	Brazilian Highlands	Goyaz Massif	
Americas	Brazilian Highlands	Mato Grosso Plateau	
Americas	Brazilian Highlands	Guiana Shield	
Americas	Brazilian Highlands	Chiquitos Plateau	
Americas	Brazilian Highlands	Parana Plateau	
Americas	Brazilian Highlands	Coastal Plain	
Americas	Guiana Highlands	Guiana Coastal Plain	
Americas	Amazon Plain	Llanos De Mojos	
Americas	Orinoco Basin		
Americas	Parana-Paraguay Plain	Gran Chaco	
Americas	Parana-Paraguay Plain	Pantanal	
Americas	Parana-Paraguay Plain	Argentine Mesopotamia	
Americas	Parana-Paraguay Plain	Pampas	
Americas	Parana-Paraguay Plain	Monte	
Americas	Patagonian Plateau		
Antarctica	East Antarctica		
Antarctica	West Antarctica		
Australia	East Australian Basins	Carpentaria Basin	Gulf of Carpentaria
Australia	East Australian Basins	Carpentaria Basin	Kynuna Platform
Australia	East Australian Basins	Great Artesian Basin	Wilcannia Threshold
Australia	East Australian Basins	Murray Basin	Naracoorte Platform
Australia	East Australian Basins	Murray Basin	Encounter Shelf
Australia	East Australian Cordillera	Cape York Platform	Coen Belt
Australia	East Australian Cordillera	Cape York Platform	Torres Strait Islands
Australia	East Australian Cordillera	North Queensland Highlands	Chillagoe Belt
Australia	East Australian Cordillera	North Queensland Highlands	Normanby Platform
Australia	East Australian Cordillera	North Queensland Highlands	Atherton Tableland
Australia	East Australian Cordillera	North Queensland Highlands	Mount Emu Lava Plains
Australia	East Australian Cordillera	North Queensland Highlands	Cairns Littoral
Australia	East Australian Cordillera	Great Barrier Reef	Murray Islands
Australia	East Australian Cordillera	Central Queensland Highlands	Bowen-Springsure Belt
Australia	East Australian Cordillera	Central Queensland Highlands	Buckland Basalt Tablelands
Australia	East Australian Cordillera	Rockhampton-Brisbane Belt	Maryborough Basin
Australia	East Australian Cordillera	Rockhampton-Brisbane Belt	Toowoomba Basalt Plateaus
Australia	East Australian Cordillera	New England Block	Clarence Basin
Australia	East Australian Cordillera	Hunter-Hawkesbury Sunkland	Sydney Basin
Australia	East Australian Cordillera	Hunter-Hawkesbury Sunkland	Warrumbungle-Liverpool Basalt Ranges
Australia	East Australian Cordillera	Hunter-Hawkesbury Sunkland	Blue Mountains
Australia	East Australian Cordillera	Central Highlands Of New South Wales	Western Slopes
Australia	East Australian Cordillera	Cobar Platform	
Australia	East Australian Cordillera	Kosciusko Massif	Gourock-Monaro Belt
Australia	East Australian Cordillera	Eastern Victorian Highlands	
Australia	East Australian Cordillera	Western Victorian Highlands	Grampians
Australia	East Australian Cordillera	Western Basalt Plains Of Victoria	Otway Hills
Australia	East Australian Cordillera	Gippsland	South Gippsland Hills
Australia	East Australian Cordillera	Gippsland	Port Phillip Sunkland
Australia	East Australian Cordillera	Western Tasmanian Highlands	Central Tasmanian Plateau
Australia	East Australian Cordillera	Bass-Midland Graben	Bass Strait
Australia	East Australian Cordillera	Ben Lomond Block	
Australia	Western Australian Shield	Yilgarn Block	Stirling-Mount Barren Block
Australia	Western Australian Shield	Yilgarn Block	Darling Hills
Australia	Western Australian Shield	Yilgarn Block	Recherche Shelf
Australia	Western Australian Shield	Donnybrook Sunkland	Naturaliste-Leeuwin Horst
Australia	Western Australian Shield	Swan Coastal Belt	Dandaragan Plateau
Australia	Western Australian Shield	Swan Coastal Belt	Greenough Block
Australia	Western Australian Shield	Swan Coastal Belt	Rottnest-Abrolhos Shelf
Australia	Western Australian Shield	Carnarvon Basin	Shark Bay-Byro Plains
Australia	Western Australian Shield	Nullagine Platform	Pilbara Block
Australia	Western Australian Shield	Nullagine Platform	Fortescue Rift
Australia	Western Australian Shield	Nullagine Platform	Hamersley Plateau
Australia	Western Australian Shield	Nullagine Platform	Onslow Coastal Plain
Australia	Western Australian Shield	Nullagine Platform	Dampier Rise
Australia	Western Australian Shield	Canning Basin	Pindan Country
Australia	Western Australian Shield	Canning Basin	Fitzroy Valley
Australia	Western Australian Shield	Canning Basin	Rowley Depression
Australia	Western Australian Shield	Kimberly Block	Wunaamin Miliwundi Range
Australia	Western Australian Shield	Kimberly Block	Durack Range
Australia	Western Australian Shield	Kimberly Block	Leveque Rise
Australia	Western Australian Shield	Kimberly Block	Browse Depression
Australia	Western Australian Shield	Kimberly Block	Londonderry Rise
Australia	Western Australian Shield	Antrim Region	Ord Basin
Australia	Western Australian Shield	Antrim Region	Cambridge Gulf Lowlands
Australia	Western Australian Shield	Antrim Region	Bonaparte Depression
Australia	Western Australian Shield	Arnhem Block	Pine Creek Belt
Australia	Western Australian Shield	Arnhem Block	Van Dieman Rise
Australia	Western Australian Shield	Arnhem Block	Arafura Shelf
Australia	Western Australian Shield	Arnhem Block	Wessel Rise
Australia	Western Australian Shield	Arunta-Sturt Block	
Australia	Western Australian Shield	Barkly Tableland	Mueller Plateau
Australia	Western Australian Shield	Barkly Tableland	Sandover-Pituri Platform
Australia	Western Australian Shield	Mount Isa-Cloncurry Fold Belt	
Australia	Western Australian Shield	MacDonnell Fold Belt	
Australia	Western Australian Shield	Amadeus Sunkland	
Australia	Western Australian Shield	Musgrave Block	
Australia	Western Australian Shield	Nurrari Plain	
Australia	Western Australian Shield	Eucla Basin	Eyre Coastal Plain
Australia	Western Australian Shield	Eucla Basin	Eucla Shelf
Australia	Western Australian Shield	Gawler Block	Stuart Range Basin
Australia	Western Australian Shield	Gawler Block	Pimba Platform
Australia	Western Australian Shield	South Australian Shatter Belt	Torrens Graben
Australia	Western Australian Shield	South Australian Shatter Belt	Spencer Graben
Australia	Western Australian Shield	South Australian Shatter Belt	Vincent Graben
Australia	Western Australian Shield	South Australian Shatter Belt	Yorke Horst
Australia	Western Australian Shield	South Australian Shatter Belt	Frome Graben
Australia	Western Australian Shield	Willyama Block	
Eurasia	Fenno-Scandian Shield	Norway Upland	
Eurasia	Fenno-Scandian Shield	Swedish Lowland	
Eurasia	Fenno-Scandian Shield	Lake Region	
Eurasia	Fenno-Scandian Shield	Karelian Trough	
Eurasia	Fenno-Scandian Shield	English Lowlands	
Eurasia	Central European Uplands	Hibernian Uplands	
Eurasia	Central European Uplands	Cornish-Welsh Uplands	
Eurasia	Central European Uplands	Pennine Chain	
Eurasia	Central European Uplands	Scottish Highlands	
Eurasia	Central European Uplands	Armorican Massive	
Eurasia	Central European Uplands	South Central Plateau (Massif Central)	
Eurasia	Central European Uplands	Central Plateau (Meseta Central)	
Eurasia	Central European Uplands	Jura Range	
Eurasia	Central European Uplands	Vosges Mountains and Black Forest Mountains	
Eurasia	Central European Uplands	Swiss-Bavarian Plateau	
Eurasia	Central European Uplands	Rhenish Massif	
Eurasia	Central European Uplands	West Hesse Highlands	
Eurasia	Central European Uplands	East Hesse Highlands	
Eurasia	Central European Uplands	Weser Uplands	
Eurasia	Central European Uplands	Bohemian Massif	
Eurasia	Central European Uplands	Cantabrian Mountains	
Eurasia	Alpine System	Pyrenees	
Eurasia	Alpine System	Alps	Southern Alps
Eurasia	Alpine System	Alps	Western Alps
Eurasia	Alpine System	Alps	Eastern Alps
Eurasia	Alpine System	Cantabrian Mountains	
Eurasia	Alpine System	Apennines	
Eurasia	Alpine System	Ebro Lowlands	
Eurasia	Alpine System	Volcanic Lowlands	
Eurasia	Alpine System	Spanish Meseta	
Eurasia	Alpine System	Dinaric-Grecian Mountains	Pindus
Eurasia	Alpine System	Andalusian Lowlands	
Eurasia	Alpine System	Corsardinian Highlands	
Eurasia	Alpine System	Baetic Cordillera	
Eurasia	Alpine System	Pannonian Basin	Western Pannonian Plain
Eurasia	Alpine System	Eastern Pannonian Plain	
Eurasia	Alpine System	Transylvanian Basin	
Eurasia	Alpine System	Central Balkan Ranges	
Eurasia	Alpine System	Upper Thracian Plain	
Eurasia	Alpine System	Carpathians	Western Carpathians
Eurasia	Alpine System	Carpathians	Eastern Carpathians
Eurasia	Alpine System	Carpathians	Southern Carpathians
Eurasia	Alpine System	Carpathians	Serbian Carpathians
Eurasia	Alpine System	Carpathians	Western Romanian Carpathians
Eurasia	Alpine System	Crimean Mountains	
Eurasia	Alpine System	Caucasus	Greater Caucasus
Eurasia	Alpine System	Caucasus	Lesser Caucasus
Eurasia	Alpine System	Caucasus	Transcaucasian Depressian
Eurasia	Alpine System	Caucasus	Kolkhida Lowland
Eurasia	Great European Plain	Aquitanian Plain	
Eurasia	Great European Plain	Netherlands	
Eurasia	Great European Plain	Northern European Lowlands	
Eurasia	Great European Plain	Polesian Lowland	
Eurasia	Great European Plain	Dnieper Lowland	
Eurasia	Great European Plain	Volhynian-Podolian Plateau	Volhynian-Podolian Upland
Eurasia	Great European Plain	Volhynian-Podolian Plateau	Moldavian Plateau
Eurasia	Great European Plain	Volhynian-Podolian Plateau	Roztocze
Eurasia	Great European Plain	Danubian Plain and Wallachian Plain	
Eurasia	Great European Plain	Black Sea-Azov Lowland	Black Sea Lowland
Eurasia	Great European Plain	Black Sea-Azov Lowland	Azov Lowland
Eurasia	Great European Plain	Donets-Azov Upland	Azov Upland
Eurasia	Great European Plain	Donets-Azov Upland	Donets Upland
Eurasia	Great European Plain	Donets-Azov Upland	Donets Ridge
Eurasia	Great European Plain	Central Russian Upland	
Eurasia	Great European Plain	Central Russian Upland	Kalach Upland
Eurasia	Great European Plain	Oka–Don Lowland	
Eurasia	Great European Plain	Russian Plain	
Eurasia	Ural Mountains	Northern Urals	
Eurasia	Ural Mountains	Central Urals	
Eurasia	Ural Mountains	Southern Urals	
Eurasia	Middle East Eastern Highlands	Zagros Mountains	
Eurasia	Middle East Eastern Highlands	Bitlis Mountains	
Eurasia	Middle East Eastern Highlands	Kopet-Dag Mountains	
Eurasia	Middle East Eastern Highlands	Elburz Mountains	Western Elburz
Eurasia	Middle East Eastern Highlands	Elburz Mountains	Central Elburz
Eurasia	Middle East Eastern Highlands	Elburz Mountains	Eastern Elburz
Eurasia	Middle East Eastern Highlands	Central Iranian Plateau	Dasht-e Kavir
Eurasia	Middle East Eastern Highlands	Central Iranian Plateau	Dasht-e Lut
Eurasia	Middle East Eastern Highlands	Pontus Mountains	
Eurasia	Middle East Eastern Highlands	Taurus Mountains	
Eurasia	Middle East Eastern Highlands	Anatolian Plateau	
Eurasia	Fertile Crescent		
Eurasia	West Siberian Plain	Taiga	
Eurasia	West Siberian Plain	Kazakh Steppe	
Eurasia	Central Siberian Upland	Yenisei Horst	
Eurasia	Central Siberian Upland	Irkutsk Basin	
Eurasia	Central Siberian Upland	Vilyuy Plain	
Eurasia	Central Siberian Upland	Aldan Basin	
Eurasia	Central Siberian Upland	Yakutsk Basin	
Eurasia	Eastern Siberian Highlands	Anadyr Highlands	
Eurasia	Eastern Siberian Highlands	Kolyma Mountains	
Eurasia	Eastern Siberian Highlands	Kamchatka Peninsula	
Eurasia	Eastern Siberian Highlands	Verkhoyansk Range	
Eurasia	Eastern Siberian Highlands	Aldan Highlands/Stanovoy Range	
Eurasia	Eastern Siberian Highlands	Sikhote-Alin Range	
Eurasia	Eastern Siberian Highlands	Sakhalin Island	
Eurasia	Northern Asian Mountains	Kentei Hills	
Eurasia	Northern Asian Mountains	Altai Mountains	
Eurasia	Indo-Gangetic Plain		
Eurasia	Himalayan Mountain System	Hindu Kush Mountains	
Eurasia	Himalayan Mountain System	Lesser Himalayas	
Eurasia	Himalayan Mountain System	Great Himalayas	
Eurasia	Himalayan Mountain System	Tethys Himalayas	
Eurasia	Himalayan Mountain System	Pamirs	
Eurasia	Himalayan Mountain System	Tibetan Plateau	
Eurasia	Deccan Plateau	Western Ghats	
Eurasia	Deccan Plateau	Eastern Ghats	
Eurasia	Deccan Plateau	Nagpur Basin	
Eurasia	Deccan Plateau	Vindhya Range	
Eurasia	Deccan Plateau	Satpura Range	
Eurasia	Deccan Plateau	Bihar Hills	
Eurasia	Central Asian Lowlands	Taklamakan Desert	
Eurasia	Central Asian Lowlands	Baikal Basin	
Eurasia	Central Asian Lowlands	Junggar Basin	
Eurasia	Central Asian Lowlands	Gobi Desert	
Eurasia	Central Asian Lowlands	Qaidam Basin	
