= Navajo section =

Physiographic section of the Colorado Plateaus Province

Coordinates: 36.3°N 109.4°W

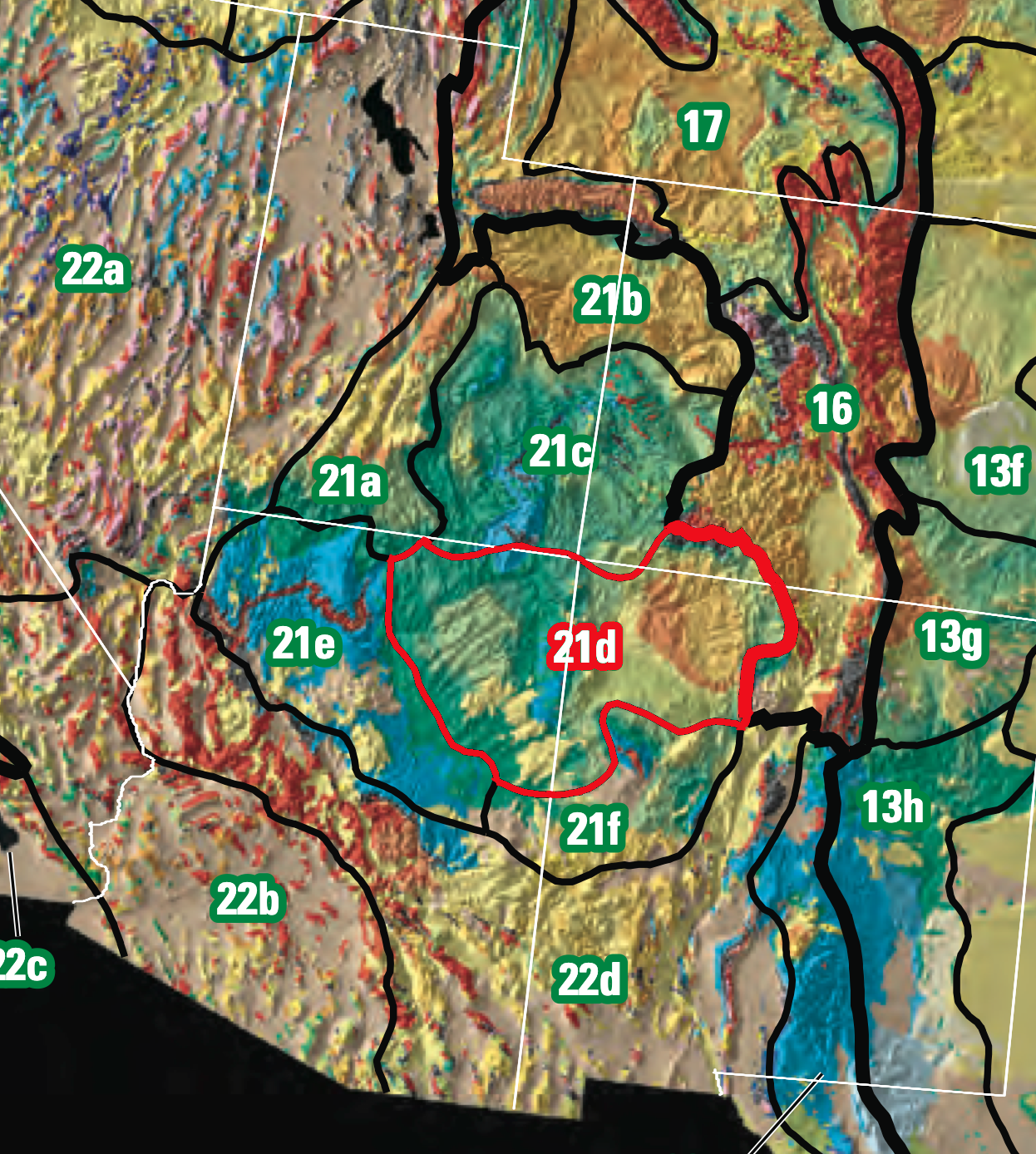
Map of Navajo physiographic section

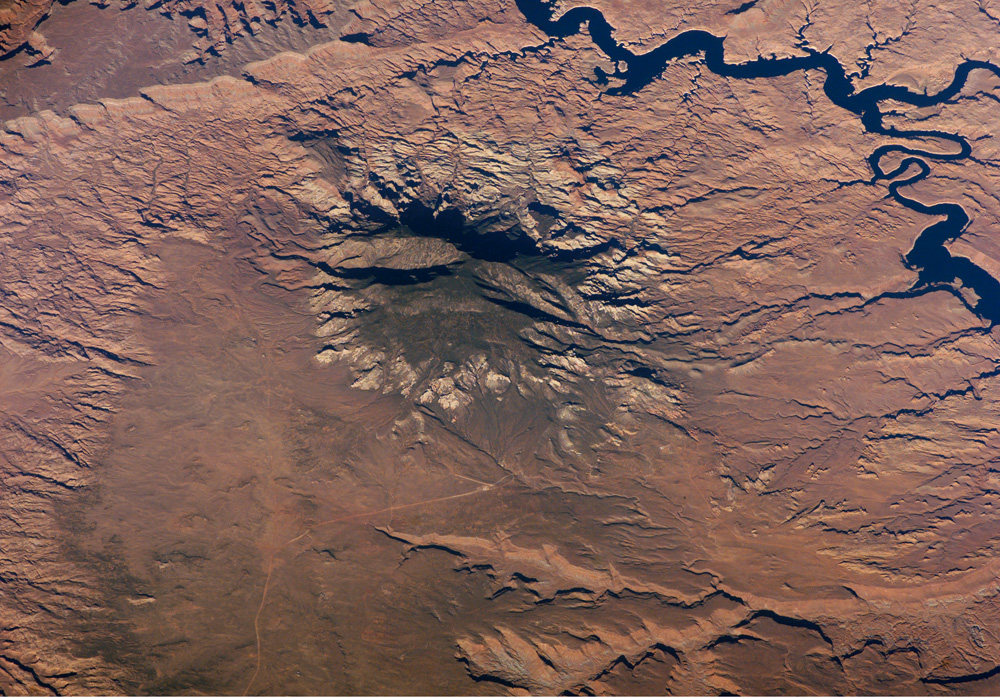
Navajo Mountain, on the northern Navajo Section boundary.

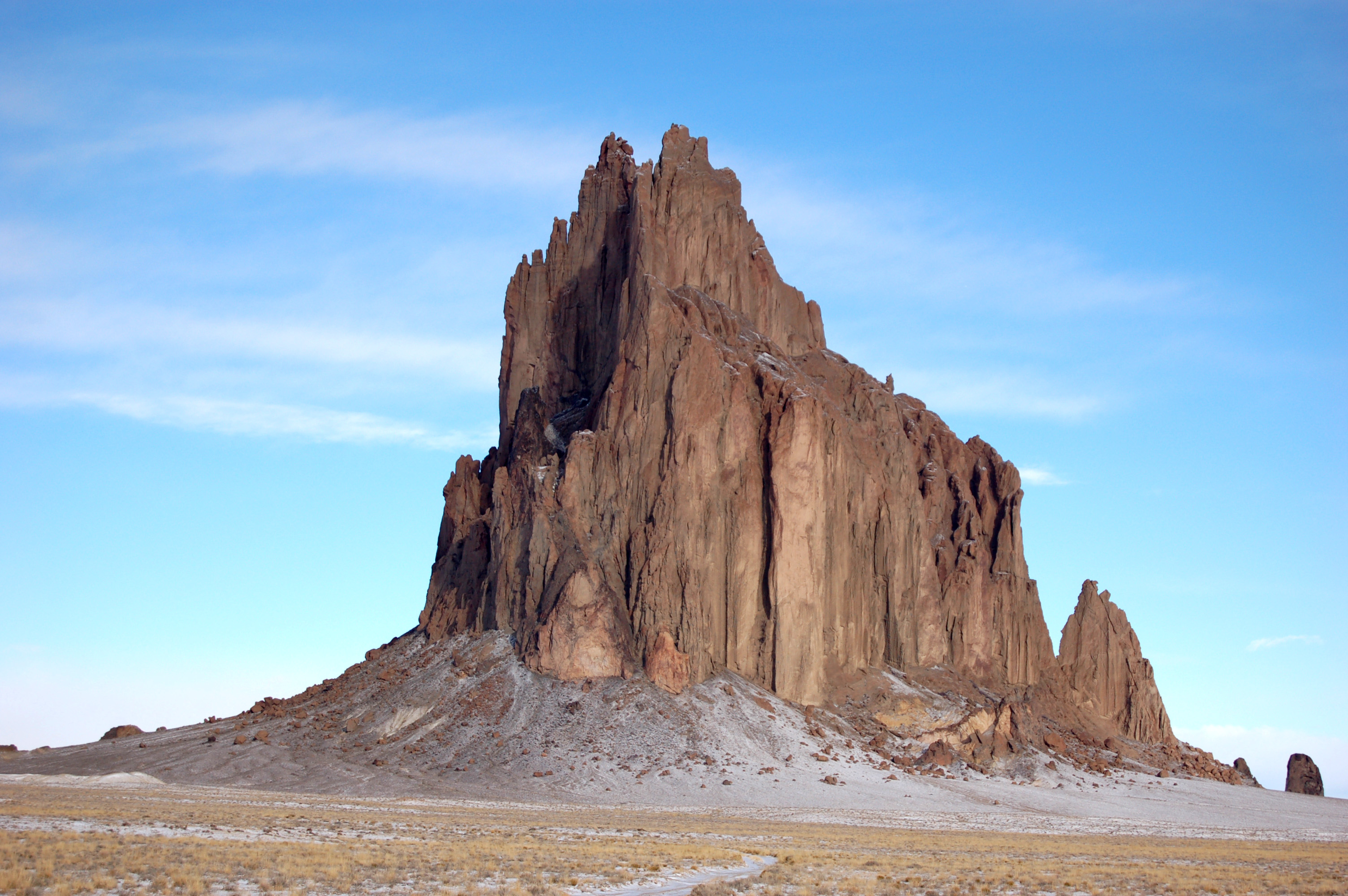
Shiprock, New Mexico.

The Navajo Section is a physiographic section of the larger Colorado Plateaus Province, which in turn is part of the larger Intermontane Plateaus physiographic Division.

== Geography ==
The Navajo Section is located in northeastern Arizona and northwestern New Mexico. It is named for the Navajo Nation, with about half of the area of the section on the Navajo Reservation.

The section is characterized by broad rolling plains on easily eroded and carved rocks, with cuestas (ridges) and tablelands capped by gently dipping resistant sandstone beds. One of the most prominent landform features of the Navajo Section is Shiprock, a 7,177 feet (2,188 m) monadnock formation near the town of Shiprock, New Mexico.

=== Elevations ===
The lowest point in the Navajo Section is about 4,700 feet (1,400 m), near the Four Corners area. The boundary between this section and the Canyon Lands Section is nearby, in the San Juan River basin. The highest point of the Navajo Section is 9,916 feet (3,022 m) at Chromo Mountain on the Continental Divide near Chama, New Mexico.

=== Adjacent ===
Adjacent to the Navajo Section are the:

1. Canyon Lands Section to the north.
2. Rio Grande rift of the Basin and Range Province to the east.
3. Acoma-Zuni Section to the south.
4. Grand Canyon Section to the west

== Geology and physiography ==
The area is predominantly generally horizontal sandstone beds with some shale sequences of late Cretaceous and early Cenozoic age. A few areas of the section also have abundant volcanic necks and buttes, but due to the arid weather and soft sandstone, many of the rock formations of the area have eroded to form distinctive features of long cuestas, shallow canyons and valleys, narrow fan terraces, undulating plateaus, isolated mesas, steep hills, and some shale badlands.

San Juan Basin

Near the Four Corners area is a steeply tilted monocline known as The Hogback, which trends southwestward from where the San Juan River enters the area. Here the San Juan River flows into an area known as the San Juan Basin, where the western San Juan Basin is typified by exposures of the Fruitland and Menefee Formations. A stepped sequence of high stream terraces, present above the San Juan River and its tributaries, represents abandoned Pleistocene flood plains.

== See also ==
- United States physiographic region
- Physiographic regions of the world
