= Physiographic regions of the United States =

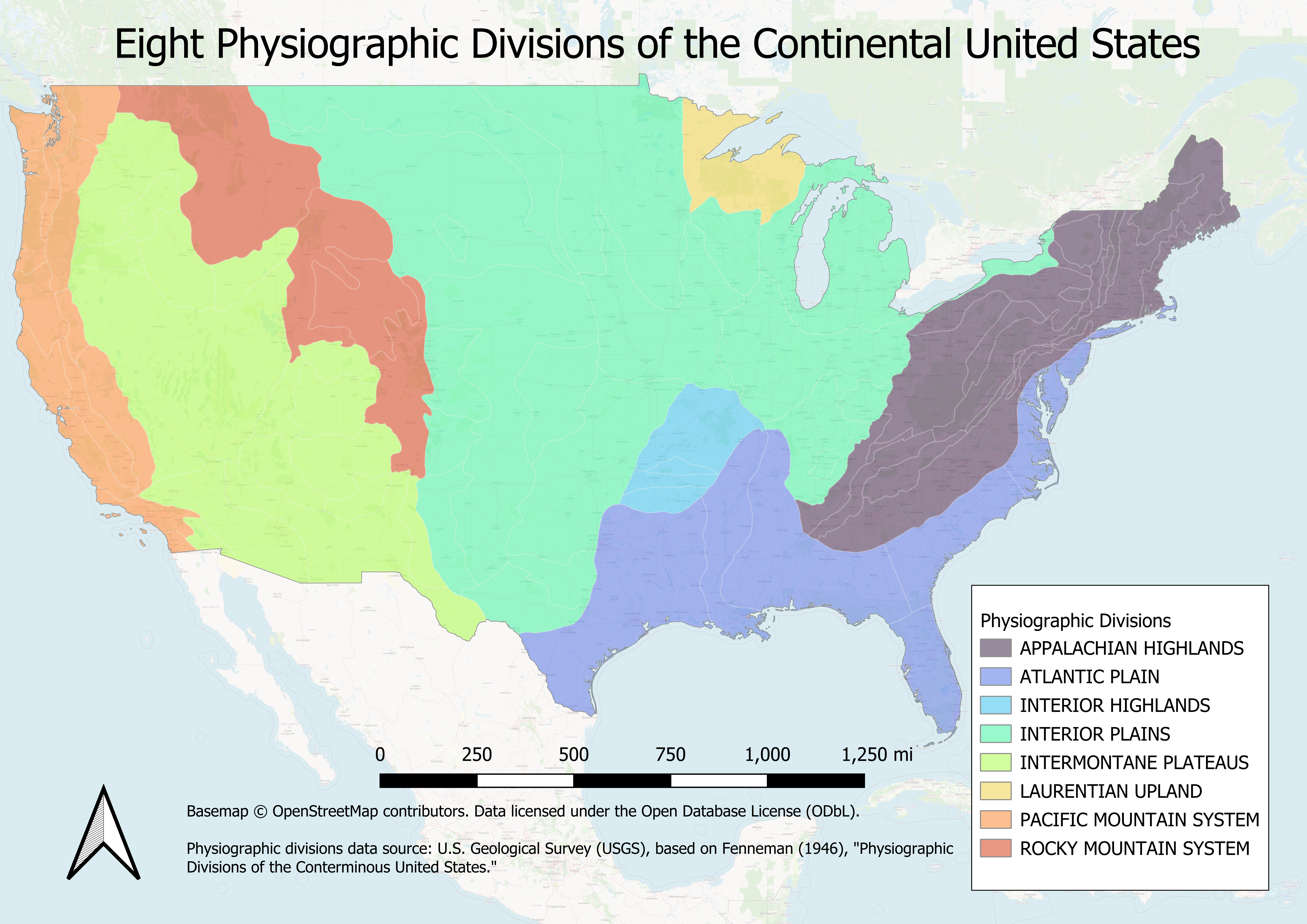
Eight Physiographic Divisions of the continental United States of America.

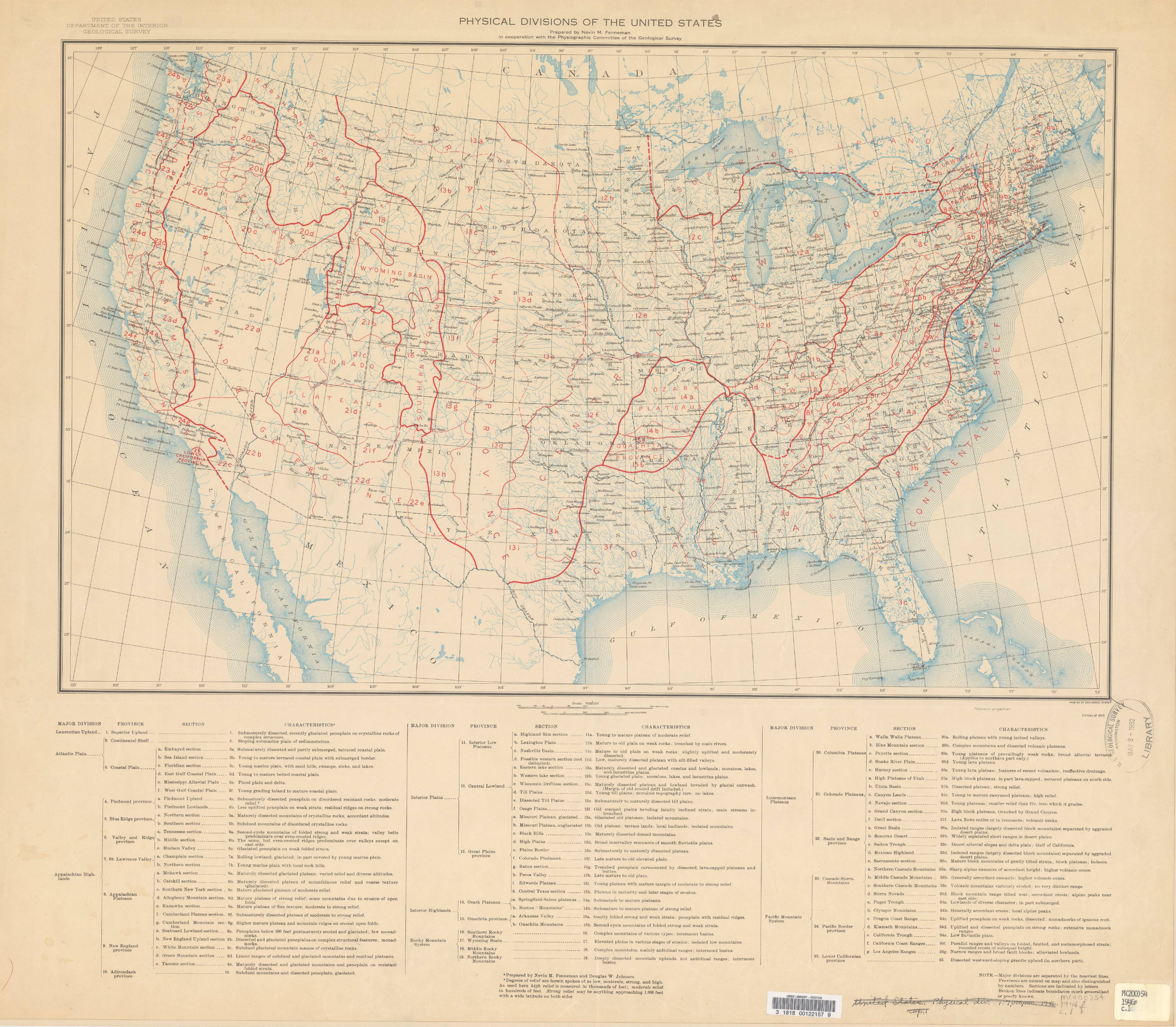
1946 Map published by USGS documenting the work of Fenneman's 1915-16 committee of the American Association of Geographers.

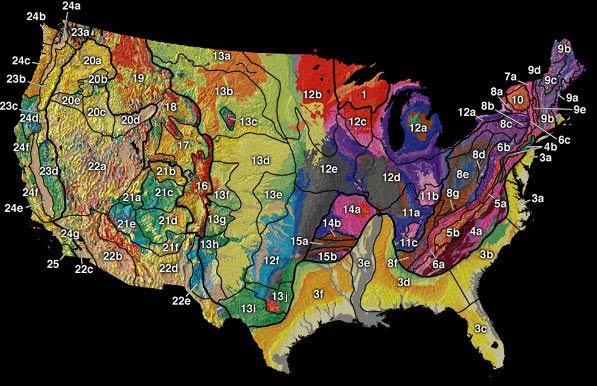
USGS map colored by paleogeological areas and demarcating the sections of the U.S. physiographic regions: Laurentian Upland (area 1), Atlantic Plain (2-3), Appalachian Highlands (4-10), Interior Plains (11-13), Interior Highlands (14-15), Rocky Mountain System (16-19), Intermontane Plateaus (20-22), & Pacific Mountain System (23-25)

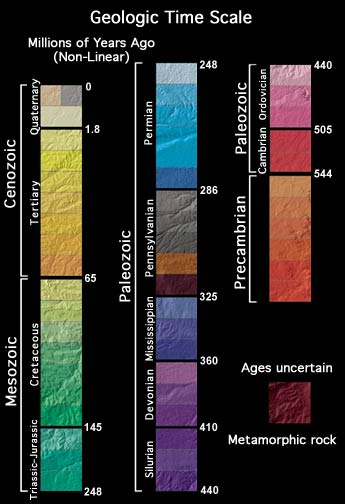
The legend of paleogeological color also depicts topographic terrain.

The physiographic regions of the contiguous United States comprise 8 divisions, 25 provinces, and 85 sections. The system dates to Nevin Fenneman's report Physiographic Divisions of the United States, published in 1916. The map was updated and republished by the Association of American Geographers in 1928. The map was adopted by the United States Geological Survey by publication in 1946.

The classification hierarchy used in the 1916 publication of the American Association of Geographers was division/province/section/subsection. The use of province in this hierarchy undoubtedly confounded the effort to develop a physiographical map consistent across the North American continent since Canada used province as the term for its first-level political subdivision. Province in Canada is a loose analogy for state in the US, and obviously would create great confusion if the same word was used in two vastly different geographical classifications. As late as 1914, the terminology used by an AAG publication used the term "natural region" as the basic denomination of physiography. That work showed 22 examples of how geographers had published works classifying North America into what had been defined as natural regions. Most included all of North America without regard to political subdivision.

Fenneman expanded and presented a derivative of this system more fully in two books, Physiography of western United States (1931), and Physiography of eastern United States (1938).

== Physiographic divisions ==
Division	Province	Section
I. Laurentian Upland	1. Superior Upland	
II. Atlantic Plain	2. Continental Shelf (not on map)	
II. Atlantic Plain	3. Coastal Plain	3a. Embayed section
II. Atlantic Plain	3. Coastal Plain	3b. Sea Island section
II. Atlantic Plain	3. Coastal Plain	3c. Floridian section
II. Atlantic Plain	3. Coastal Plain	3d. East Gulf Coastal Plain
II. Atlantic Plain	3. Coastal Plain	3e. Mississippi Alluvial Plain
II. Atlantic Plain	3. Coastal Plain	3f. West Gulf Coastal Plain
III. Appalachian Highlands	4. Piedmont	4a. Piedmont Upland
III. Appalachian Highlands	4. Piedmont	4b. Piedmont Lowlands
III. Appalachian Highlands	5. Blue Ridge province	5a. Northern section
III. Appalachian Highlands	5. Blue Ridge province	5b. Southern section
III. Appalachian Highlands	6. Valley and Ridge province	6a. Tennessee section
III. Appalachian Highlands	6. Valley and Ridge province	6b. Middle section
III. Appalachian Highlands	6. Valley and Ridge province	6c. Hudson Valley
III. Appalachian Highlands	7. St. Lawrence Valley	7a. Champlain section (dividing line undefined in 1946 map)
III. Appalachian Highlands	7. St. Lawrence Valley	7b. Northern section (dividing line undefined in 1946 map)
III. Appalachian Highlands	8. Appalachian Plateaus province	8a. Mohawk section
III. Appalachian Highlands	8. Appalachian Plateaus province	8b. Catskill section
III. Appalachian Highlands	8. Appalachian Plateaus province	8c. Southern New York section
III. Appalachian Highlands	8. Appalachian Plateaus province	8d. Allegheny Plateau section
III. Appalachian Highlands	8. Appalachian Plateaus province	8e. Kanawha section
III. Appalachian Highlands	8. Appalachian Plateaus province	8f. Cumberland Plateau section
III. Appalachian Highlands	8. Appalachian Plateaus province	8g. Cumberland Mountain section
III. Appalachian Highlands	9. New England Province	9a. Seaboard Lowland section
III. Appalachian Highlands	9. New England Province	9b. New England Upland section
III. Appalachian Highlands	9. New England Province	9c. White Mountain section
III. Appalachian Highlands	9. New England Province	9d. Green Mountain section
III. Appalachian Highlands	9. New England Province	9e. Taconic section
III. Appalachian Highlands	10. Adirondack province	
IV. Interior Plains	11. Interior Low Plateaus	11a. Highland Rim
IV. Interior Plains	11. Interior Low Plateaus	11b. Lexington Plain
IV. Interior Plains	11. Interior Low Plateaus	11c. Nashville Basin
IV. Interior Plains	12. Central Lowland	12a. Eastern Lake
IV. Interior Plains	12. Central Lowland	12b. Western Lake
IV. Interior Plains	12. Central Lowland	12c. Wisconsin Driftless
IV. Interior Plains	12. Central Lowland	12d. Till Plains
IV. Interior Plains	12. Central Lowland	12e. Dissected Till Plains
IV. Interior Plains	12. Central Lowland	12f. Osage Plains
IV. Interior Plains	13. Great Plains	13a. Missouri Plateau (glaciated)
IV. Interior Plains	13. Great Plains	13b. Missouri Plateau (unglaciated)
IV. Interior Plains	13. Great Plains	13c. Black Hills
IV. Interior Plains	13. Great Plains	13d. High Plains
IV. Interior Plains	13. Great Plains	13e. Plains Border
IV. Interior Plains	13. Great Plains	13f. Colorado Piedmont
IV. Interior Plains	13. Great Plains	13g. Raton section
IV. Interior Plains	13. Great Plains	13h. Pecos Valley
IV. Interior Plains	13. Great Plains	13i. Edwards Plateau
IV. Interior Plains	13. Great Plains	13j. Central Texas
V. Interior Highlands	14. Ozark Plateaus	14a. Springfield-Salem plateaus
V. Interior Highlands	14. Ozark Plateaus	14b. Boston Mountains
V. Interior Highlands	15. Ouachita province	15a. Arkansas Valley
V. Interior Highlands	15. Ouachita province	15b. Ouachita Mountains
VI. Rocky Mountain System	16. Southern Rocky Mountains	
VI. Rocky Mountain System	17. Wyoming Basin	
VI. Rocky Mountain System	18. Middle Rocky Mountains	
VI. Rocky Mountain System	19. Northern Rocky Mountains	
VII. Intermontane Plateaus	20. Columbia Plateau	20a. Walla Walla Plateau
VII. Intermontane Plateaus	20. Columbia Plateau	20b. Blue Mountain section
VII. Intermontane Plateaus	20. Columbia Plateau	20c. Payette section
VII. Intermontane Plateaus	20. Columbia Plateau	20d. Snake River Plain
VII. Intermontane Plateaus	20. Columbia Plateau	20e. Harney section
VII. Intermontane Plateaus	21. Colorado Plateaus	21a. High Plateaus of Utah
VII. Intermontane Plateaus	21. Colorado Plateaus	21b. Uinta Basin
VII. Intermontane Plateaus	21. Colorado Plateaus	21c. Canyon Lands
VII. Intermontane Plateaus	21. Colorado Plateaus	21d. Navajo section
VII. Intermontane Plateaus	21. Colorado Plateaus	21e. Grand Canyon section
VII. Intermontane Plateaus	21. Colorado Plateaus	21f. Datil section
VII. Intermontane Plateaus	22. Basin and Range Province	22a. Great Basin section
VII. Intermontane Plateaus	22. Basin and Range Province	22b. Sonoran Desert
VII. Intermontane Plateaus	22. Basin and Range Province	22c. Salton Trough
VII. Intermontane Plateaus	22. Basin and Range Province	22d. Mexican Highland
VII. Intermontane Plateaus	22. Basin and Range Province	22e. Sacramento section
VIII. Pacific Mountains	23. Cascade-Sierra Mountains	23a. Northern Cascade Mountains
VIII. Pacific Mountains	23. Cascade-Sierra Mountains	23b. Middle Cascade Mountains
VIII. Pacific Mountains	23. Cascade-Sierra Mountains	23c. Southern Cascade Mountains
VIII. Pacific Mountains	23. Cascade-Sierra Mountains	23d. Sierra Nevada
VIII. Pacific Mountains	24. Pacific Border province	24a. Puget Trough
VIII. Pacific Mountains	24. Pacific Border province	24b. Olympic Mountains
VIII. Pacific Mountains	24. Pacific Border province	24c. Oregon Coast Range
VIII. Pacific Mountains	24. Pacific Border province	24d. Klamath Mountains
VIII. Pacific Mountains	24. Pacific Border province	24e. California Trough
VIII. Pacific Mountains	24. Pacific Border province	24f. California Coast Ranges
VIII. Pacific Mountains	24. Pacific Border province	24g. "Los Angeles Ranges—(Transverse Ranges)"
VIII. Pacific Mountains	25. Lower California province—(Peninsular Ranges)	
