= Cascade-Sierra province =

Physiographic region in the western United States

Cascade Range
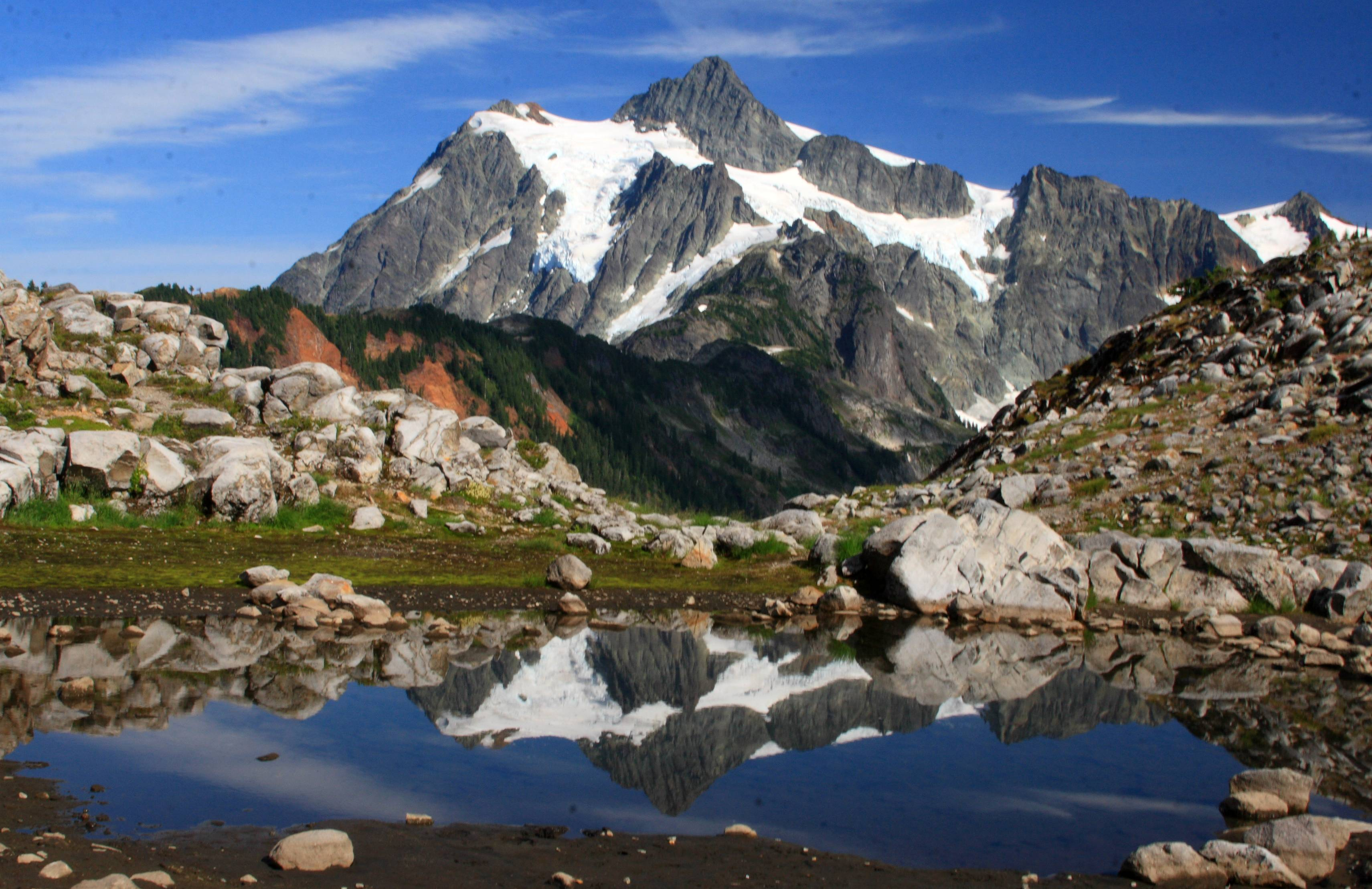
- Mount Shuksan

Highest point
- Peak: Mount Rainier
- Elevation: 14,411 ft (4,392 m)

Dimensions
- Length: 700 mi (1,100 km)

Geography
- Countries: United States and Canada
- States: British Columbia, Washington, Oregon, and California

Sierra Nevada
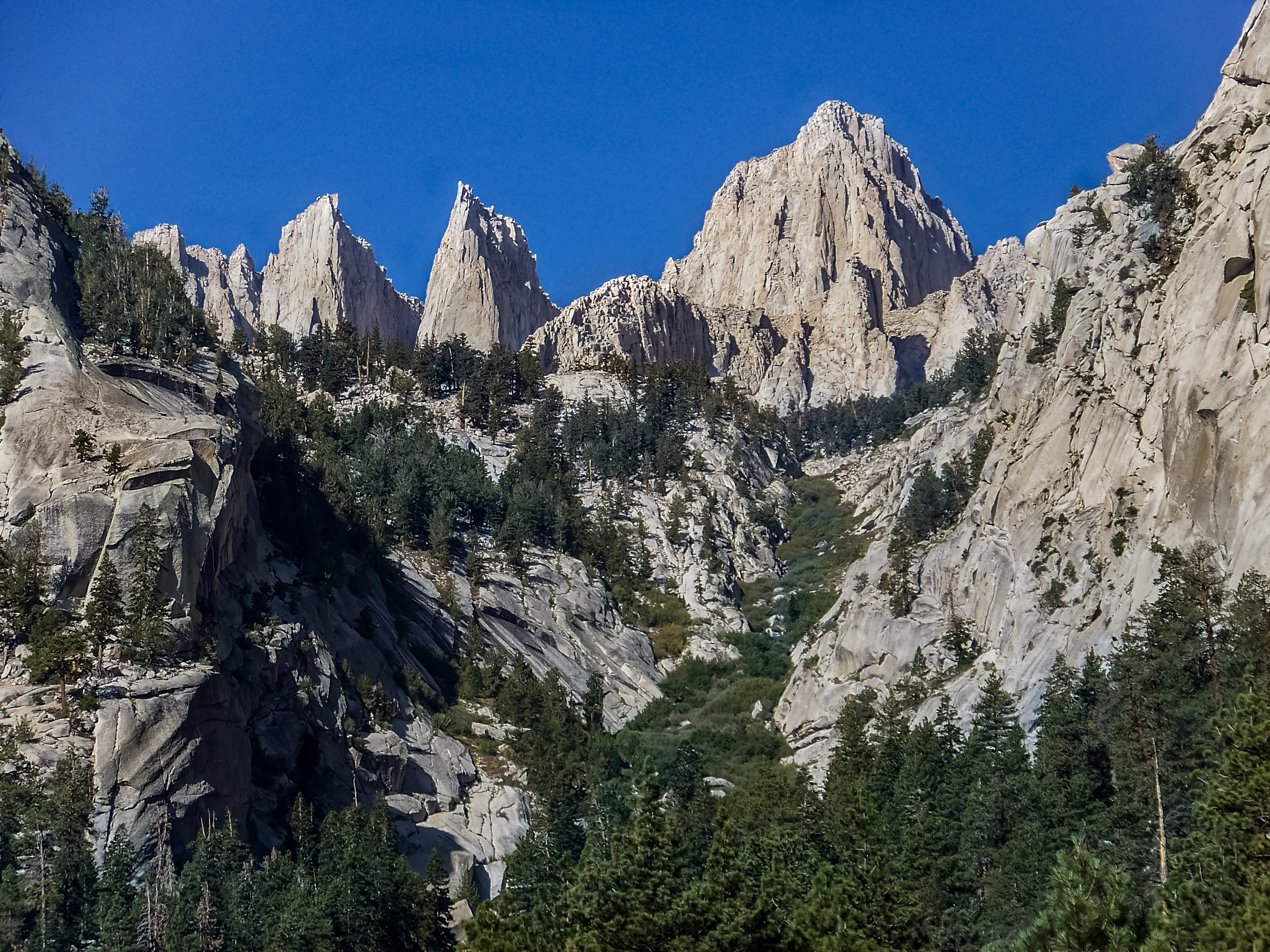
- Mount Whitney

Highest point
- Peak: Mount Whitney
- Elevation: 14,505 ft (4,421 m)

Dimensions
- Length: 400 mi (640 km) north-south from Fredonyer Pass to Tehachapi Pass
- Width: 65 mi (105 km)

Geography
- Country: United States
- States: California and Nevada

The Cascade-Sierra province is a physiographic region of mountains in the western United States, east and adjacent to Pacific Border province and west and adjacent to the Basin and Range Province (in the south) and Columbia Plateau Province (in the north).

== About the region ==
The Cascade-Sierra province stretches approximately 1,000 mi (1,600 km) from the high desert region of the Mojave Desert in Southern California to just north of the border between British Columbia and the state of Washington.

The region is extremely diverse geologically and ecologically and is commonly divided into two regions: the Cascade Mountains and the Sierra Nevada Mountains. This province is part of a larger physiographic region that extends from Alaska in the north to the southern tip of South America. Several tectonic plates meet and form this region and make it one of the most geologically active places in North America.

The province is home to several national forests, including the Lassen, Modoc, and Plumas National Forests. The Modoc Plateau, an area of high elevation basalt flows between the Medicine Lake Highlands and the Warner Mountains, is also within the region. The ecology of the province is extremely diverse and contains areas of pine, aspen, and cypress forests, mixed conifer and evergreen forests, along with montane meadows, fens, mammoth granite outcroppings, vernal pools, and sagebrush flats.

== Cascade Mountain Range ==
The Cascade Mountains form the northern portion of the Cascade-Sierra province. The Cascades were created from thousands of small, short-lived volcanoes along the Cascadia subduction zone that over millions of years built a foundation of lava and volcanic debris on which the mountains rise. This range includes thirteen major volcanic centers and are part of the Pacific Ocean's Ring of Fire. The two most recent eruptions are the Mount Lassen eruptions from 1914 to 1921, and the Mount St. Helens eruption in 1980.

== Sierra Nevada Mountain Range ==
The Sierra Nevada Mountains form the southern portion of the Cascade-Sierra province. Like the Cascade Range, the Sierra Nevada Range formed from a chain of volcanoes along a subduction zone. However unlike the Cascade volcanoes, those that formed the Sierra Nevada Range are mostly extinct and buried deep within the earth forming a bed of solidified lava that is responsible for the gray granitic rocks of the Sierra. One of the best known areas in the Sierra Nevada range is Yosemite National Park.

== See also ==
- Fault (geology)
- Geography of California
- Geology of the Yosemite area
- List of United States physiographic regions
- Mountain formation
- Pacific Northwest
- Physiographic regions of the world
- Plate tectonic
- United States physiographic region
