= Acoma-Zuni Section =

Colorado Plateaus province physiographic section

Coordinates: 35.0641°N 107.8145°W

The Acoma-Zuni Section is a physiographic section of the larger Colorado Plateaus province, which in turn is part of the larger Intermontane Plateaus physiographic division. It is bounded on the east by the Albuquerque Basin, a Rio Grande Rift basin in the northern part of the Basin and Range Province. The Datil-Mogollon Section lies to the south. It is also a newly defined physiographic unit that includes the northern part of the area previously designated the Datil Section. The southeastern edge of the Colorado Plateau from Springerville, Arizona, northeastward to the tip of the Sierra Nacimiento comprises this area.

== Geology ==
The Rio San Jose, the major tributary to the Rio Puerco, drains much of the Acoma-Zuni Section. The eastern edge of the Acoma-Zuni Section is where the less-deformed rocks of the Colorado Plateau are truncated by the Neogene Rio Grande Rift, from the northern La Jencia Basin, Ladron Mountains, Mesa Lucero, and Rio Puerco fault zone to the southeastern edge of the Sierra Nacimiento. Much of the remainder of the section is late Neogene volcanic landforms—volcanoes (cinder cones and composite cones), lava flows, necks, and dikes, interspersed with erosional and aggradational landforms and bedrock structures typical of the Colorado Plateau.

Rocks in the area range in age from Late Triassic to Holocene, including the Triassic Chinle and Wingate Sandstone formations; the Jurassic Entrada Sandstone, Summerville and Zuni Sandstone formations; the Cretaceous Dakota Sandstone; Tertiary gravels and basalts, and Quaternary landslide, eolian, alluvial, and spring deposits.
