= Datil-Mogollon Section =

Geographic physiographic part of the Colorado Plateau province

Coordinates: 35.08°N 109.05°W

The Datil-Mogollon Section is a physiographic section of the larger Colorado Plateau province, which in turn is part of the larger Intermontane Plateaus physiographic division. It is a transitional area between the Basin and Range Province and the Colorado Plateau Province. It is also a newly defined unit that includes the southern part of the area previously designated the Datil Section.

== Geology ==
The Datil-Mogollon Section is located along the southeastern rim of the Colorado Plateau, in New Mexico and eastern Arizona.

=== West ===
Most of the Datil-Mogollon Section in Arizona is the White Mountain volcanic field. It is an extensive area covered with thick lavas and tuffs. There are also remnants of large stratovolcanoes, mainly composed of basaltic andesite. High tablelands are capped with tuffs, andesite, and basalt lavas, and volcanic-derived conglomeratic sandstones and mudstones.

=== South ===
The principal structure of the southeastern Datil-Mogollon area is a large central-type volcano, Mount Taylor, that rises to 11,389 ft (3,471 m). It is surrounded by numerous smaller volcanic centers and volcanic necks with extensive lava-covered mesas and valleys to the south. The largest mesa is 46 miles (74 km) long and about 23 miles (37 km) wide, with an upper elevation of 1,900 ft (580 m) above the surrounding plain, and is capped with about 300 ft (91 m) of lava. The ancient lava flows extend southward into the Mexican Highlands section of the Basin and Range Province and consequently that border of the Colorado Plateau Province is ill-defined.

The principal structure of the southwestern Datil-Mogollon Section is the Mogollon Rim in Arizona. It extends approximately 200 miles (320 km) from northern Yavapai County eastward to near the border with New Mexico.

=== East ===
The Datil-Mogollon Section is bounded on the east by basins of the Rio Grande rift, which are part of the Mexican Highland Section of the Basin and Range Province. Along the eastern edge of the Datil-Mogollon, the Mexican Highland extends northward along the Rio Grande depression to the Southern Rocky Mountains. The boundary between the depression and the uplifted Colorado Plateau is sharply defined by the westernmost faults of the depression. The transition has several large structural basins and block-faulted ranges.

=== North ===
To the north are other physiographic sections of the Colorado Plateau Province. From east to west they are the Navajo Section in New Mexico and Arizona, and the southeastern Grand Canyon Section.

== See also ==
- Sections of the Colorado Plateau Province
- Basin and Range Province
- United States physiographic region
