= Physiographic province =

Mid-level region in the Fenneman model of physiographic regionalization

A physiographic province is a geographic region with a characteristic geomorphology, and often specific subsurface rock type or structural elements. The continents are subdivided into various physiographic provinces, each having a specific character, relief, and environment which contributes to its distinctiveness. The physiographic provinces are then subdivided into smaller physiographic sections.

== Examples ==
In eastern North America, the Atlantic Coastal Plain, Piedmont, Blue Ridge Mountains, Ridge-and-Valley Appalachians, and Appalachian Plateau are specific physiographic provinces.

In the Western United States of western North America: the Basin and Range Province, Cascade Range, Colorado Plateau, Rio Grande rift, Great Basin, Central Valley (California), Peninsular Ranges, Los Angeles Basin, and Transverse Ranges are examples of physiographic provinces.

== See also ==
- Physiographic provinces — index
- Physiographic sections — index
- Physiographic regions of the world — chart with physiographic provinces and sections by continent.
  - Physiographic regions of Mexico
  - Physiographic regions of the United States
- Geologic province
  - Geologic provinces of the United States
