= Wyoming Basin physiographic province =

Coordinates: 42.523422°N 109.652504°W

External image
- Wyoming Basins

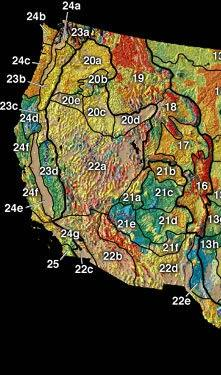
The Wyoming Basin (17) includes the Great Divide Basin.

The Wyoming Basin physiographic province is a geographic area through which the Continental Divide of the Americas traverses. The province includes the Washakie Basin and Great Divide Basins, and is demarcated by the following:

- southwest: Uinta Mountains
- west: west side of Green River watershed

== See also ==
- Wyoming Basin shrub steppe
