= Harney section =

Intermontane plateau in Oregon, US

- Plateau
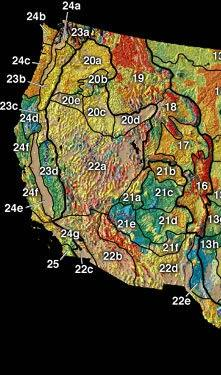
- The Harney physiographic section (20e) is part of the Columbia Plateau (20).
- Interactive map of Harney section
- Coordinates: 43°N 117°W
- Location: Columbia Plateau

The Harney section is an intermontane plateau in eastern Oregon that borders the Great Basin section to the south, the Middle Cascade section to the west and three other Columbia Plateau sections on the north, northeast, and east (Walla Walla, Blue Mountain, and Piute).

The Harney Basin is the drainage basin that includes the watershed of the Harney and Malheur Lakes within the Oregon closed basin to the south of this United States physiographic region.
