= Interior Plains =

Physiographic and geologic region of North America

The Interior Plains are highlighted in red.

The Interior Plains is a vast international region that spreads across the Laurentian craton of central North America. It extends along the east flank of the Rocky Mountains from the Gulf Coast region to the Arctic Beaufort Sea. In Canada, it encompasses the Canadian Prairies separating the Canadian Rockies from the Canadian Shield, as well as the Boreal Plains and Taiga Plains east of the Mackenzie and Richardson Mountains. In the United States, it includes the Great Plains of the West/Midwest and the tallgrass prairie region to the south of the Great Lakes extending east to the Appalachian Plateau region.

== Geologic history ==
A series of tectonic plate collisions in the crust that formed the center of the North American continent laid the groundwork for the modern-day interior plains. Mountain building and erosion around the plains as well as flooding from inland seas provided sediments that make up the rock strata of the interior plains.

=== Proterozoic Eon (2500 to 539 million years ago) ===
Between 2.0 and 1.8 billion years ago the Hearne-Rae, Superior, and Wyoming cratons were sutured together to form the North American/Laurentia craton in an event called the Trans-Hudson Orogeny (THO). The tectonic activity that followed along the edges of the four main cratons sparked mountain building in those regions. The formation of the Himalayas is following the same process after the Indian Plate began colliding with the Eurasian Plate about 10 millions years ago.

The interior of Laurentia remained relatively flat and became a basin for eroded sediment from mountains at the beginning of the current time period, the Phanerozoic Eon. The only remaining outcrops from this orogeny in the interior plains are in the Black Hills of South Dakota. The sediments that formed the Black Hills were granite and different types of igneous rocks, which make up the basement of bedrock in central North America. However, much of the Black Hills sediment has been metamorphosed and deformed, so it is uncertain what the conditions were like at the time of their formation.

=== Paleozoic Era (539 to 252 million years ago) ===
This period has a large importance in Earth's history as it saw the Cambrian explosion and Permian extinction. When global sea level rose and continents became partially submerged, the oceans had an explosion of complex life, which was the first time an event like this occurred on Earth. However, the center of Laurentia remained above sea level and as the continent moved east towards other supercontinents like Gondwana, the Appalachian Mountains began to form around 400 MYA. This coincided with the formation of Pangea around 300 MYA, when the Appalachians were at their peak height. The central plains of Laurentia were subjected to deposition of eroded sediment from these mountains. The oldest sediments from this period are felsic igneous rocks and granite that have since been metamorphosed, while the younger sediments are made up of sandstone, shale, limestone, and coal. Sediments deposited in the interior plains from this era are currently buried deep beneath the surface where they are difficult to study.

=== Mesozoic Era (252 to 66 million years ago) ===
Around 220 MYA, the supercontinent Pangea broke apart, and the North American continent began to move west and isolate itself. For much of this period the interior plains were covered by inland seas. During the Jurassic period, the Sundance Sea formed along the western coast of the North American continent and extended from northern Canada to the interior plains, covering parts of Wyoming, Montana, North Dakota, and South Dakota. Coquina and sandstone layers from marine deposition were deposited on top of rock layers from the Paleozoic Era. During the Cretaceous period, another inland sea called the Western Interior Seaway was formed. This body of water extended from present-day Alaska to the Gulf of Mexico and covered almost all the interior plains west of the current boundary of the Mississippi River. Limestone-shale couplets, as well as carbonate layers, are commonly found in sedimentary deposits from this inland sea. Towards the end of this period, the inland seas began to drain due to uplift from the formation of the Rocky Mountains.

=== Cenozoic Era (66 million years ago to Present Day) ===
The Laramide Orogeny event was when the western Cordillera was formed due to the flat-slab subduction of the Farallon Plate under the North American Plate. This created the frontal range of the Rockies from Montana through New Mexico. The outcrops seen at the surface of the Rockies are made up of sandstone, granite, and limestone; as well as metamorphic rocks uplifted from the Proterozoic Period. The interior plains have remained relatively flat during this period and recent sedimentation is from erosion of the newly formed Rocky Mountains as well as continued erosion from Appalachia. In general, Rocky Mountain sediment is deposited on the plains west of the Mississippi River, and Appalachian sediment is deposited to the east of the Mississippi River.

== Glacial history ==
2.6 million years ago at the start of the Pleistocene Epoch, the Laurentide Ice Sheet began to spread southwards to cover North America down to the northern Great Plains on the western side of the Interior Plains and down into most of Minnesota and Wisconsin. The Laurentide Ice Sheet had a large influence on the morphology of the Interior Plains during the end of the Pleistocene. During the retreat, the Laurentide scoured numerous pockets of sediment. Upon the plate's melting, those pockets were filled, resulting in the kettle lakes. The Great Lakes and both Great Slave Lake and Great Bear Lake of Canada were formed by the Laurentide. During the retreat, the Laurentide gouged and filled the glacial paleolake McConnell in northern Canada. As the region uplifted and rebounded isostatically from the mass of the ice sheet, paleolake McConnell was split into Great Slave Lake and Great Bear Lake. Great Slave Lake's basin formed under the 4-kilometer thick Keewatin Dome that today is the deepest lake in North America. A vast amount of smaller lakes were formed as well and serve an integral part of ethos in the surrounding regions. For example, Minnesota is often referred to as “the Land of 10,000 Lakes” due to the number and widespread recreational use of the state's lakes.

Much of the loess distributed within the Interior Plains has its origin in glaciers. In glaciated conditions, sand and silt-laden meltwater originating from alpine glaciers in the Rocky Mountains generated alluvial deposits at their base. This alluvium was then distributed throughout the Interior Plains by strong winds.

== Sediment transport ==
Sediment transport within the Interior Plains occurs primarily by aeolian and fluvial processes. Due to climate change, the average temperature of the Interior Plains is increasing and the region is becoming more arid. Because of the increase in rainstorm intensity, rain-driven erosion will grow as a factor of soil erosion in the Interior Plains.

=== Fluvial processes ===
Civil engineering projects have altered the fluvial geomorphology of the Interior Plains. Normal sediment transport by river and channel systems is interrupted by river-blocking structures such as dams and flow regulators. Before 1900, the estimated annual sediment transport by the Mississippi River to the Gulf of Mexico was 400 million tons. However, in the early 20th century, engineering projects including dams were created on the Missouri River, meander cutoffs, river training, bank revetments, and soil erosion control have reduced the annual transport rate to between 100 and 150 million tons of sediment per year. The artificial structures trap suspended sediment from traveling as it would in an un-engineered river.

=== Aeolian processes ===
While average annual temperatures vary significantly between the northern and southern portions of the Interior Plains, the climate is characterized by susceptibility to droughts due to generally low annual precipitation.

Due to a warm climate and evapotranspiration rates surpassing precipitation rates, the southern Interior Plains are highly susceptible to droughts and soil erosion. A significant feature of aeolian erosion in the Interior Plains is the ubiquitous loess deposits. The deposits were placed by winds during the Pleistocene epoch. The Nebraska Sand Dunes are an example of the sand and loess during the epoch. These dunes were formed during the Pleistocene by Northwesterly winds depositing alluvial silt and sand. That loess is so prevalent in the Interior Plains is evidence of significant aeolian erosion, as deposits are generally accumulations of wind-blown dust.

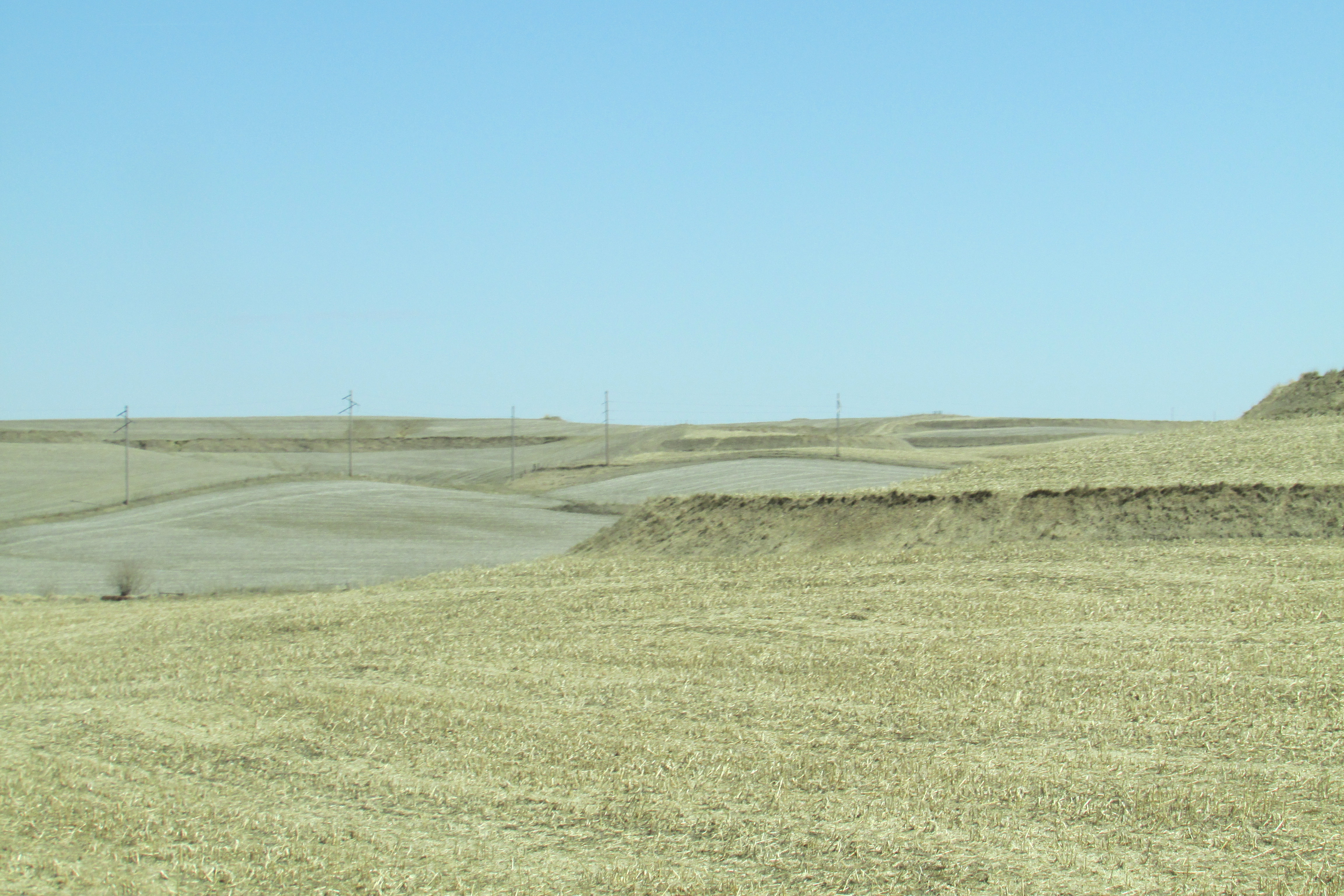
Loess Hills in western Iowa along I-80.

Following World War I, wheat farming in the fertile loess soil of the Interior Plains swelled. The expansion of farmland eliminated many prairies containing soil-stabilizing grasses. While droughts in the region were common, during the following drought, aeolian soil erosion was exacerbated by the reduced soil-holding prairie grasses. Dust storms eroded hundreds of millions of tons of topsoil, causing dust storms for months in the historical region known as the Dust Bowl. On May 12, 1934, alone, an estimated 200 million tons of wind-eroded topsoil were transported to the Atlantic Ocean.

In response to the rapid aeolian erosion, soil preservation methods were implemented. In the years following the Dust Bowl, 18,500 miles (29,800 km) of shelterbelt were planted by the Works Progress Administration to reduce wind intensity.

== Current land use ==
Grassland and shrubland make up the largest portion of the Interior Plains within the United States, at 44.4 percent. The western margin is mainly shortgrass prairie dominated by blue grama and buffalograss. Prairies on the eastern side of the Interior Plains are dominated by tall grass varieties including big bluestem and switchgrass. The two regions are separated by mixed-grass prairie, which contains both short and long grass varieties as well as little bluestem and western wheatgrass. Land used for cattle-grazing is included under this classification, which sustains nearly 50 percent of all United States beef cattle.

In Canada, provinces located within the Interior Plains produce nearly 60 percent of all beef cattle.

Much of the land in the Interior Plains is used for agriculture. In the year 2000, 43.8 percent of the Great Plains portion of the Interior Plains were used for agriculture. By far, wheat comprises the largest portion of the agricultural yield in region; combined, wheat exports from the Interior Plains make up more than half of the world's exports. Other significant crops produced in the region include barley, corn, cotton, sorghum, soybeans, and canola, which is particularly important to Canadian exports.

Other sources comprise much smaller portions of the land. In decreasing percentage, forests make up 5.8%, wetland makes up 1.6%, developed land makes up 1.5%, barren land makes up .6%, and land used for mining makes up .1%.

== Physiography ==
The Interior Plains physiographic area stretches across Canada and the United States, and the two governments each use a different hierarchical system to classify their portions. In Canada, the Interior Plains makes up one of seven physiographic areas included in the highest level of classification - defined as a "region" in that country. In the United States it is one of eight physiographic areas (of the contiguous 48 states) included in the highest classification, defined as a "division" there.

=== Interior Plains in Canada ===
The Interior Plains of Canada are one of seven physiographic areas included in the highest level classification in that country. That country calls this primary classification level "region." For some of the seven regions, a subregion schema is provided. For other physiographic regions (such as the Interior Plains and Appalachian Uplands) subregions are not developed, but the tertiary level (called "division" in Canada) is used in the mapping data.

The following list is of the 14 physiographic divisions in the Interior Plains of Canada. Further information can be found at https://atlas.gc.ca/phys/en/index.html

- Alberta Plain
- Alberta Plateau
- Anderson Plain
- Colville Hills
- Cypress Hills
- Fort Nelson Lowland
- Great Bear Plain
- Great Slave Plain
- Horton Plain
- Manitoba Plain
- Peace River Lowland
- Peel Plain
- Peel Plateau
- Saskatchewan Plain

=== Interior Plains in the United States ===
The following is a breakdown of the secondary (provinces), and tertiary (sections) physiographic areas of the Interior Plains portion in the United States:

==== Central Lowland ====
- Dissected Till Plains
- Eastern Lake
- Osage Plains
- Till Plains
- Western Lake
- Wisconsin Driftless

==== Great Plains ====
- Black Hills
- Central Texas
- Colorado Piedmont
- Edwards Plateau
- High Plains
- Missouri Plateau, Glaciated
- Missouri Plateau, Unglaciated
- Pecos Valley
- Plains Border
- Raton

==== Interior Low Plateau ====
- Highland Rim
- Lexington Rim
- Nashville Basin

== See also ==
- Great Plains

- Shortgrass prairie
- Mixed grass prairie
- Tallgrass prairie

- Prairie
- Prairies Ecozone
- Canadian Prairies
- Geography of North America
