= Nevin M. Fenneman =

Geology Professor

Nevin Melancthon Fenneman (26 December 1865 – 4 July 1945) was an American professor of geology, with a long career at the University of Cincinnati. His contributions were primarily in the large scale geographical understanding of American geology and based on his wide ranging studies, he produced a classification of US physiographic regions using a three-tiered system of 8 major divisions, 25 provinces and 78 sections that remains in use today.

== Family and early life ==
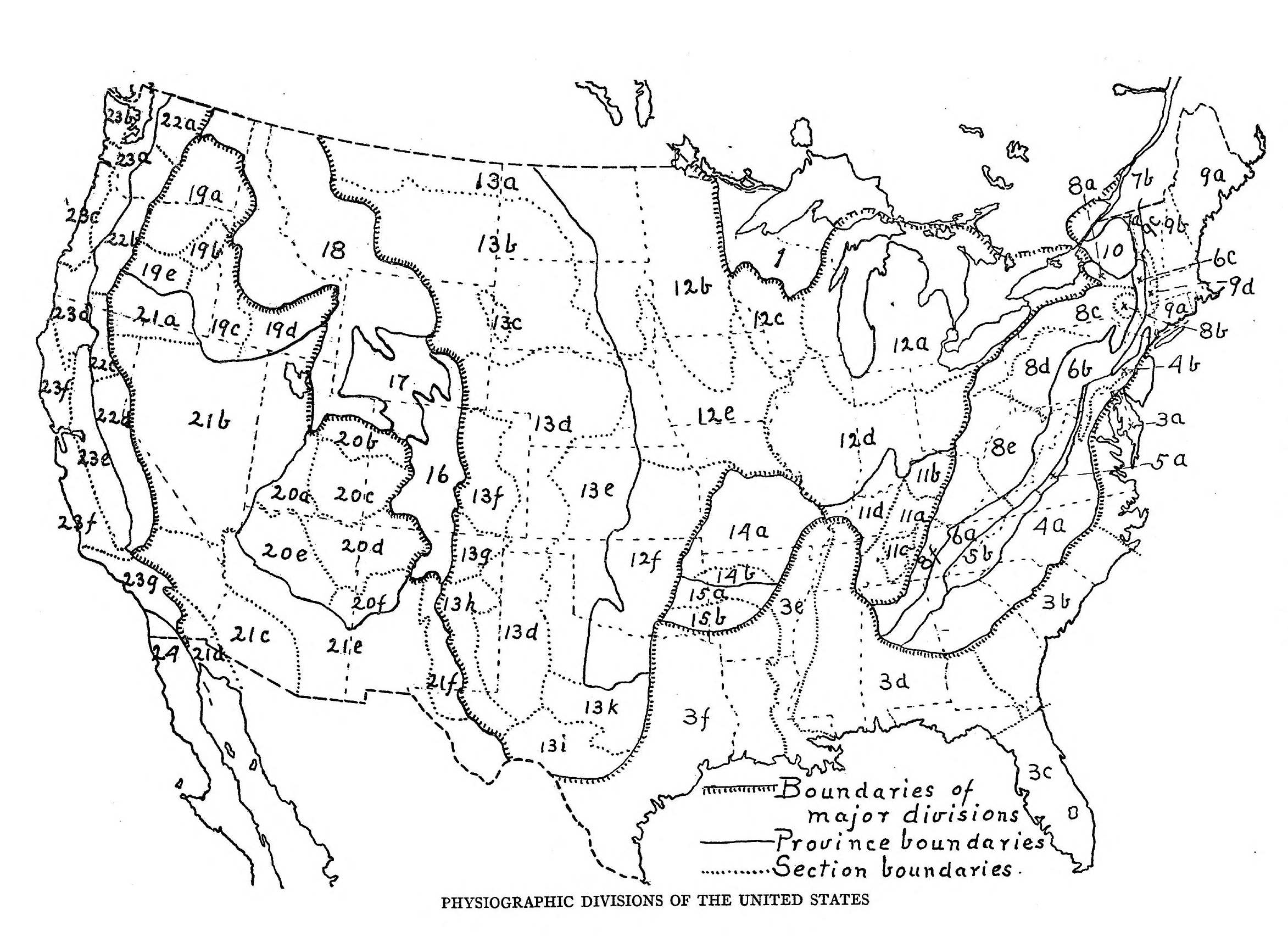
Fenneman's 1917 map of US physiographic regions

Fenneman's grandfather was a German from Westphalia, Johann Heinrich Vennemann, who moved to Baltimore in 1840. His son and Fenneman's father studied Calvinistic theology at the Heidelberg College in Tiffin, Ohio, and became a minister in the Reformed Church, altering his name to William Henry Fenneman. Nevin was born when W.H. Fenneman worked in Lima, Ohio, and named after the American theologian John Williamson Nevin with the middle name after the Lutheran reformer Philipp Melanchthon (1497-1560). His mother Rebecca Oldfather (originally 'Aultvater'), was of German and Irish descent and came from the Shenandoah Valley.

Fenneman was also trained, following the family tradition, at Heidelberg College, receiving an AB in 1883 after which he taught at schools. Moving to Greensburg, he became a headmaster in 1886 and taught math and chemistry. He became a professor at the Colorado State Normal School (now Western Colorado University) in 1892. Here he married colleague Sarah Alice Glisan and began to take a keen interest in geography and landforms of the United States. A summer training course at Harvard in 1895 reoriented him and he was impressed by the teaching of William Morris Davis.

== Career ==
Fenneman went to study at the University of Chicago in 1898 and received a MA on the Laramie Cretaceous Series working under T.C. Chamberlin and C.R. Van Hise of the Wisconsin Geological Survey. He then worked on his PhD, receiving it after three semesters after which he joined the University of Colorado as its first professor of geology. After a year, he joined the University of Wisconsin, Madison. In 1907 he moved to the University of Cincinnati where he spent the rest of his career. His major work was on the classification of the US into physiographic subdivisions which he attempted using a three-tiered system that is still widely in use. He was the president of the Association of American Geographers in 1918 and the president of the Geological Society of America in 1935.
