= Pacific Border province =

Physiographic province

Coordinates: 42°N 124°W

Map of the physiographic provinces of the lower 48 United States, showing the Pacific Border province (number 18).

The Pacific Border province is a physiographic province of the Physiographic regions of the world physical geography system.

== Description ==
The Pacific Border province encompasses most of the North American Pacific Coast, with the southern end at the start of the Lower California-Peninsular Ranges Province in Southern California. The Pacific Border province is in the larger Pacific Mountain System Division—Region. The region is prone to earthquakes, residing along the eastern edge of the Pacific Ring of Fire.

=== Sections ===
The Pacific Border province contains seven separate and smaller sections:

- Puget Trough
- Olympic Mountains
- Oregon Coast Range
- Klamath Mountains
- California Trough
- California Coast Ranges
- Transverse Ranges (Los Angeles Ranges)

== See also ==
- Cascade-Sierra province
- Pacific Coast Ranges
