= Canyon Lands =

Section of the Colorado Plateau

Coordinates: 37.07°N 110.39°W

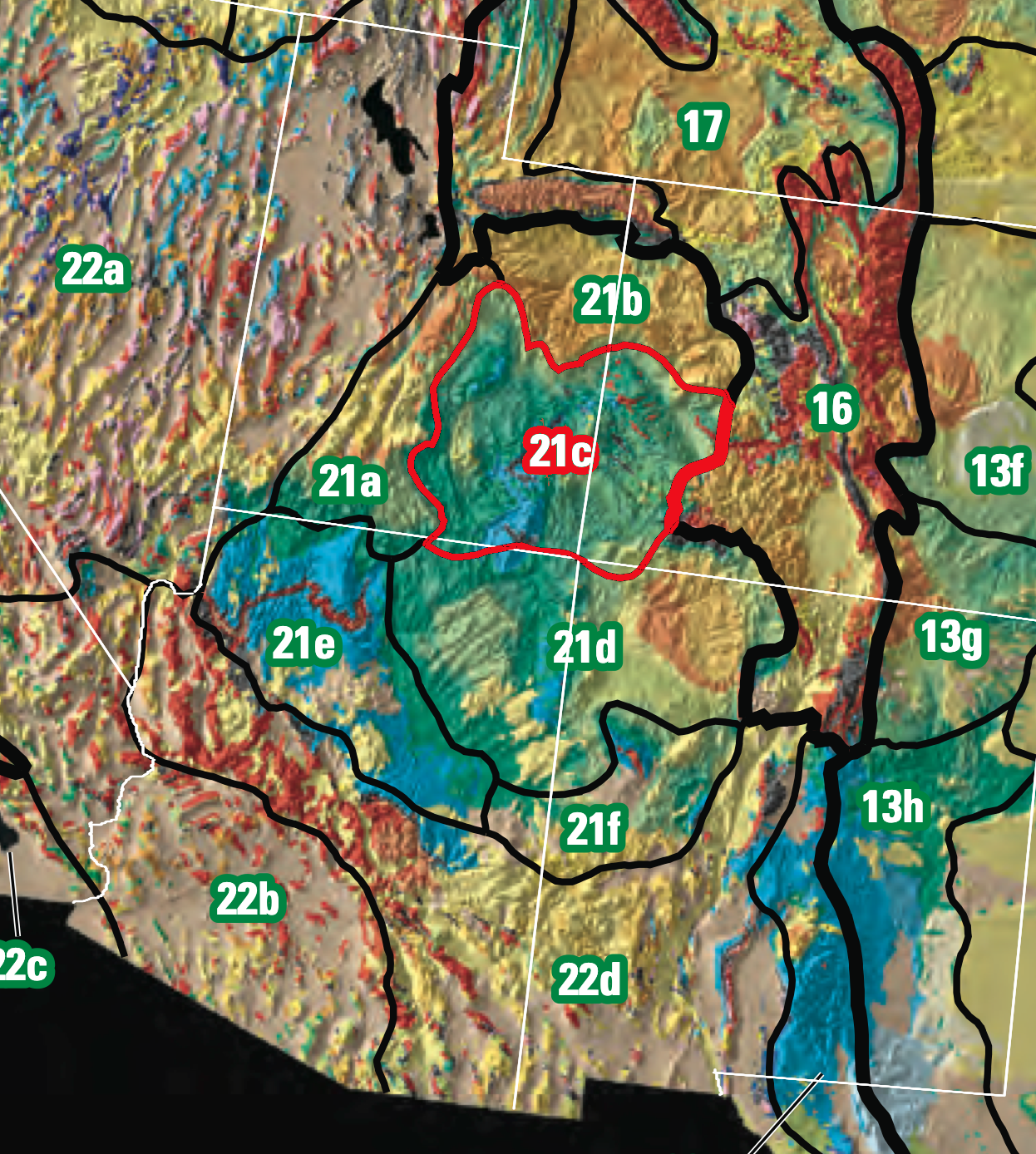
Map of the Canyon Lands physiographic section

The Canyon Lands Section of the Colorado Plateau is a physiographic section of the larger Colorado Plateaus province, which in turn is part of the larger Intermontane Plateaus physiographic division in the Western United States.

== Description ==
The Canyon Lands are a desolate, but spectacularly scenic sandstone area of southeastern Utah and northeastern Arizona. Dominated by canyons (as the name implies) this section has four large upwarps between which are structural basins. Very little faulting is associated with the upwarps or basins. Other distinctive features of the Canyon Lands Section are the laccolithic mountains, like the Henry Mountains and the La Sal Mountains. These are structural domes.

The turbid San Juan River flows into the region from the east, through a deep meandering gorge, which, with its tributaries, drains a far-reaching area, including the La Plata Mountains, the San Juan Mountains and other lesser ranges on the Continental Divide, the Chuska Mountains, and enormous areas of mesa land in the interior of the basin. From the Wasatch Range and Aquarius Mountains on the west come other, but lesser, silt-laden streams, all carving the deep, winding canyons which have given this country its name and developed a weirdly dissected landscape. The Colorado River is the largest such stream.

In northeastern Arizona is Monument Valley, where sharp spires, obelisks, and tower-like masses of rock rise hundreds of feet above their surroundings. At the eastern margin of the Canyon Lands is the Mesa Verde, a huge cuesta that has been deeply dissected by streams. Here in great recesses in the canyon walls are found the ruins of ancient cliff dwellings.

East of the Little Colorado River are the brilliantly colored areas known as the Painted Desert. Here the rocks show gorgeous colors in strata that are gently inclined and present a series of cliffs that are slowly migrating as weathering and erosion proceed.

The area north of the canyon of the San Juan River has several surfaces varying from 6,000–7,000 ft (1,800–2,100 m) above sea level. There are bold escarpments bordering some of these plateaus, canyons with steep walls, and a group of mesas called the Tables of the Sun, and several national monuments containing natural bridges.

The Canyon Lands terminate, approximately, at a third, intermittent barrier formed by the Paria Plateau, Black Mesa, and the Chuska Mountains mass.

== Geology ==
Perhaps the dominant physical feature within the area is the San Rafael Swell occupying the majority of Emery County, Utah. This feature is a large northeast trending upwarp approximately 75 miles (121 km) long and 30 miles (48 km) wide that is part of a much larger, double-plunging anticline (e.g., dome) structure. This large, regional fold exposes rocks of Pennsylvanian through Cretaceous age. Resistant beds of sandstone are exposed as hogbacks on the steeply upturned east and west flanks of the anticline and are referred to locally as "reefs." Three perennial rivers (the Muddy, San Rafael, and Price) flow eastward across the San Rafael Swell into the Green and Colorado River systems.

== See also ==
- Canyonlands National Park
