= Dissected Till Plains =

Physiographic section of the central United States

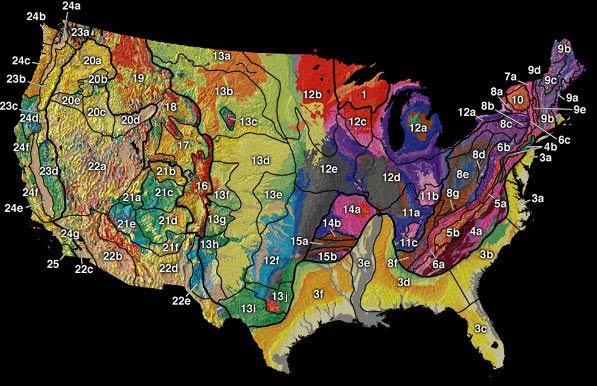
Continental U.S. physiographic regions. Region 12e identifies the Dissected Till Plains.

The Dissected Till Plains are physiographic sections of the Central Lowlands province, which in turn is part of the Interior Plains physiographic division of the United States, located in southern and western Iowa, northeastern Kansas, the southwestern corner of Minnesota, northern Missouri, eastern Nebraska, and southeastern South Dakota.

The Dissected Till Plains were formed during the Pre-Illinoian Stage. Glacial scouring and deposition by the Laurentide Ice Sheet and the later accumulation of loess during the Wisconsin Stage left behind the rolling hills and rich, fertile soils found today in the region.

The region is also the western edge of the Corn Belt.

== Geology ==
As a part of the Central Lowland geomorphic province. It is a glacier till plain from flat to rolling plain that slopes towards either the Missouri or Mississippi rivers. It is moderately dissected. Local relief is 20 to 165 feet (6.1 to 50.3 m). The region is pocketed by small human landform, i.e., strip-mines among a hummocky or ridge-swale topography. Streams drain and erode the area, moving soils and depositing them downstream. Elevation ranges from 600 to 1,500 feet (180 to 460 m).

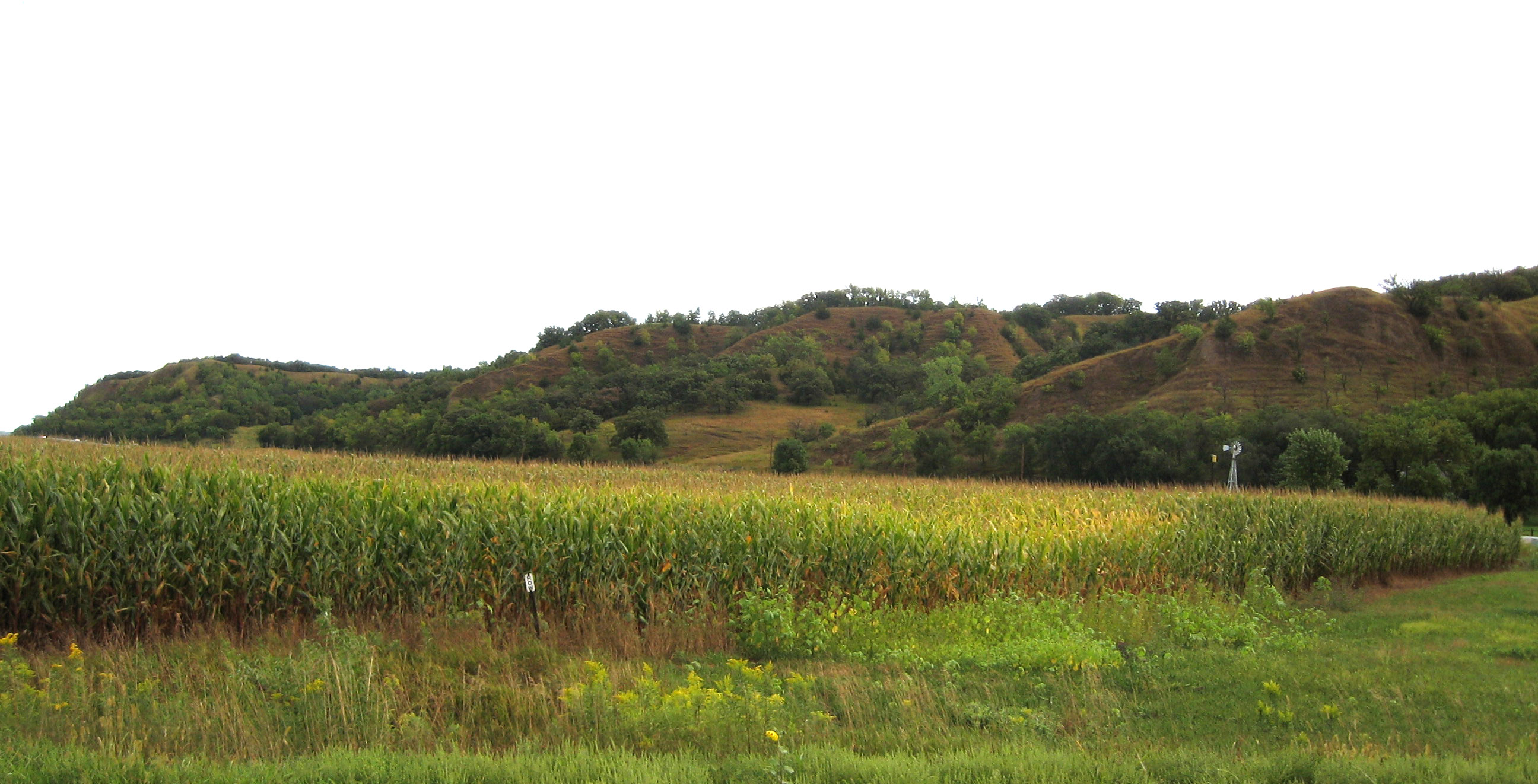
Loess hills in western Iowa

Loess (unconsolidated aeolian silt), as much as 25 feet (7.6 m) thick thins toward the east, covers most uplands. Pleistocene (pre-Illinoisan) till lies beneath the loess, covering the bedrock up to 300 feet (91 m) deep. Along the edges, it thins to less than 30 feet (9.1 m). The Mississippi and Missouri floodplains have up to 150 feet (46 m) of unconsolidated Tertiary and Quaternary alluvium (gravel, sand, silt, and clay) over the bedrock, thinner in the river valleys.

Bedrock appears along the margins. Cretaceous shale and sandstone occur in the northwestern corner, the Nebraska, Minnesota and Iowa boundary section. Permian sandstone is along the western margin or the Missouri Valley. Pennsylvanian shale, limestone, and coal is beneath nearly the entire geologic unit. Mississippian, Devonian and Ordovician shale and carbonate are the bedrock along the eastern and southern areas. Bedrock is visible along the deeper drainage's and in eroded "windows" of the unconsolidated surface soils.

== Geography ==
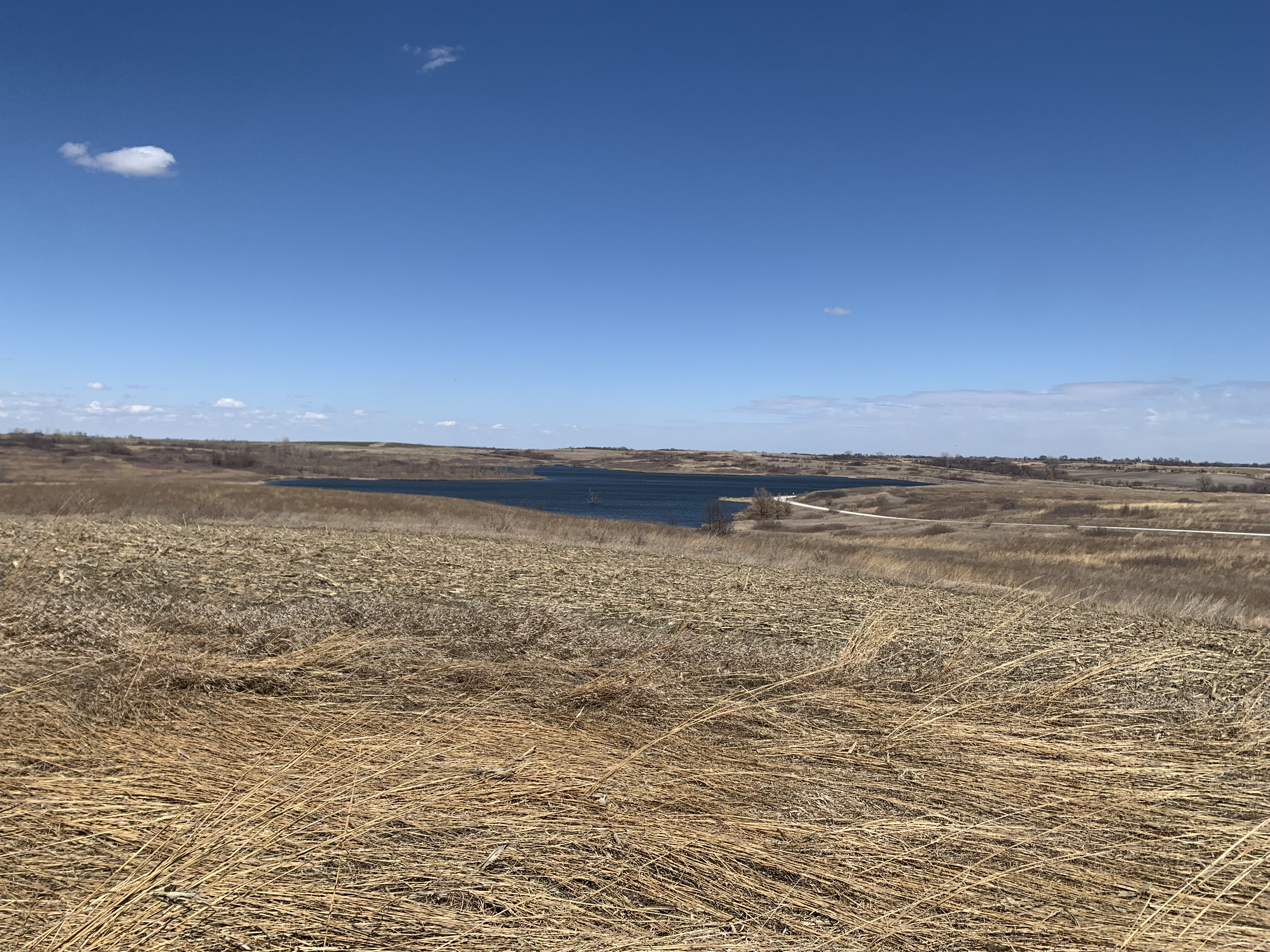
Prairie in northwestern Missouri

The Dissected Till Plains is a sub-unit of the Central Lowlands in the Interior Plains of North America. It is centered on the Iowa-Missouri state line. The eastern border is the Mississippi River and bounded on the south by the Missouri River Valley across central Missouri. Its western boundary is about 100 miles (160 km) west of the Missouri Rivers border along the Kansas/Missouri – Nebraska/Iowa state line. Its northern border is a line dipping from the Sioux River valley of South Dakota and Minnesota, south into Iowa along a line demarking the Missouri valley from the interior lowlands of Iowa, then curving northward again on a line demarking the interior lowlands of Iowa, from the Mississippi River valley on the east.

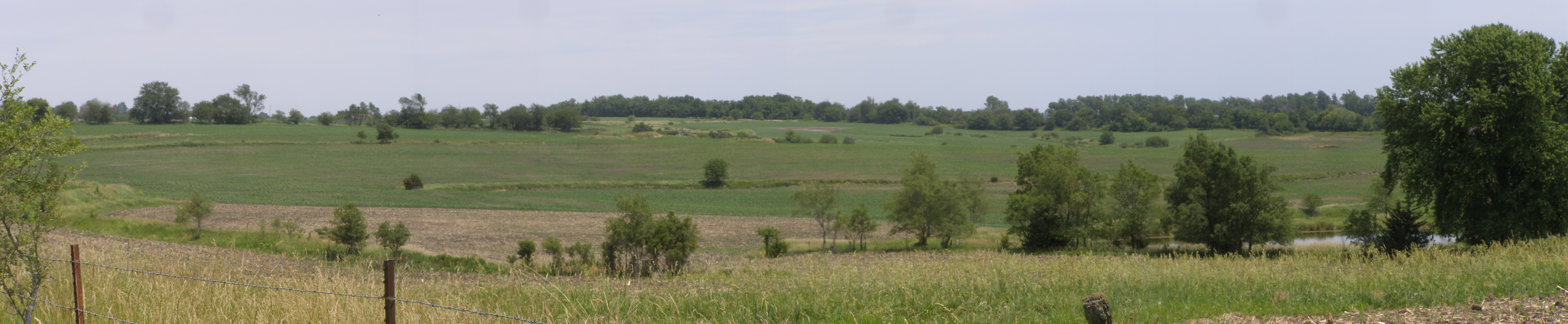
Southern Iowa Drift Plain

- Missouri – The northern tier from the Missouri Valley between St. Louis and Kansas City north to the Iowa border.
- Iowa – A U-shaped area including the Missouri River valley on the west and the Mississippi hill country on the east.
- Kansas – Eight counties in the northeast corner.
- Nebraska – Thirty eastern counties from the Missouri River to about the 98th longitude or about 100 miles (160 km) of the state.
- South Dakota – An L-shaped section along the Sioux River from north of Sioux Falls down to its junction with the Missouri River and then west up the Missouri for about 100 miles (160 km).
- Minnesota – Three counties in the southwestern corner along the Sioux River and eight counties in the southeast in the Mississippi River hill country around Rochester.
