= Basin and Range Province =

Physiographic region extending through western United States and Mexico

One of the various geographical definitions of the boundaries of the Province

The Basin and Range Province is a vast physiographic region covering much of the inland Western United States and northwestern Mexico. It is defined by unique basin and range topography, characterized by abrupt changes in elevation, alternating between narrow faulted mountain chains and flat arid valleys or basins. The physiography of the province is the result of tectonic extension that began around 17 million years ago in the early Miocene epoch.

The numerous ranges within the province in the United States are collectively referred to as the "Great Basin Ranges", although many are not actually in the Great Basin. Major ranges include the Ruby Mountains, the Snake Range, the Panamint Range, the White Mountains, the Toiyabe Range, the Sandia Mountains, and the Chiricahua Mountains. The highest point fully within the province is White Mountain Peak in California, while the lowest point is the Badwater Basin in Death Valley at −282 feet (−86 m). The province's climate is arid, with numerous ecoregions. Most North American deserts are located within it.

The Basin and Range Province should not be confused with the Great Basin, a region defined by its unique hydrological characteristics (internal drainage) that overlaps much of the greater Basin and Range physiographic region. Nor should it be confused with the Basin and Range National Monument, located in Southern Nevada, which is one small part of the much larger province.

== Geography ==
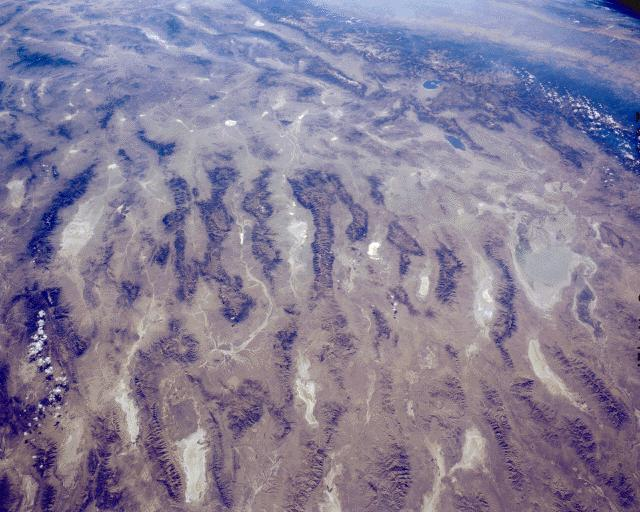
NASA satellite photo of typical Basin and Range topography across central Nevada

The Basin and Range Province includes much of western North America. In the United States, it is bordered on the west by the eastern fault scarp of the Sierra Nevada and spans over 500 miles (800 km) to its eastern border marked by the Wasatch Fault, the Colorado Plateau and the Rio Grande Rift. The province extends north to the Columbia Plateau and south as far as the Trans-Mexican Volcanic Belt in Mexico, though the southern boundaries of the Basin and Range are debated. In Mexico, the Basin and Range Province is dominated by and largely synonymous with the Mexican Plateau.

Evidence suggests that the less-recognized southern portion of the province is bounded on the east by the Laramide Thrust Front of the Sierra Madre Oriental and on the west by the Gulf of California and Baja Peninsula with notably less faulting apparent in the Sierra Madre Occidental in the center of the southernmost Basin and Range Province.

Common geographic features include numerous endorheic basins, ephemeral lakes, plateaus, and bolson valleys alternating with mountains (as described below). The area is mostly arid and sparsely populated, although there are several major metropolitan areas, such as Reno, Las Vegas, Salt Lake City, Phoenix, Tucson, El Paso—Ciudad Juárez, Mexicali, and Hermosillo.

== Geology ==
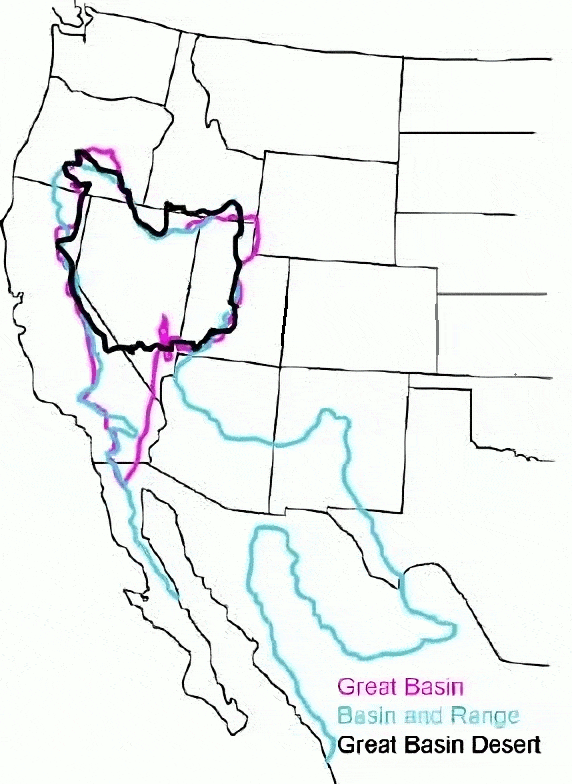
The hydrographic Great Basin (magenta outline), distinguished from the Great Basin Desert (black), and the Basin and Range Geological Province (teal).

It is generally accepted that basin and range topography is the result of extension and thinning of the lithosphere, which is composed of crust and upper mantle. Extensional environments like the Basin and Range are characterized by listric normal faulting, or faults that level out with depth. Opposing normal faults link at depth producing a horst and graben geometry, where horst refers to the upthrown fault block and graben to the down dropped fault block.

The average crustal thickness of the Basin and Range Province is approximately 30–35 km and is comparable to extended continental crust around the world. The crust in conjunction with the upper mantle comprises the lithosphere. The base of the lithosphere beneath the Basin and Range is estimated to be about 60–70 km. Opinions vary regarding the total extension of the region; however, the median estimate is about 100% total lateral extension. Total lateral displacement in the Basin and Range varies from 60 to 300 km since the onset of extension in the Early Miocene with the southern portion of the province representing a greater degree of displacement than the north. Evidence exists to suggest that extension initially began in the southern Basin and Range and propagated north over time.

Clarence Dutton compared the many narrow parallel mountain ranges that distinguish the unique topography of the Basin and Range to an "army of caterpillars crawling northward."

=== Tectonics ===
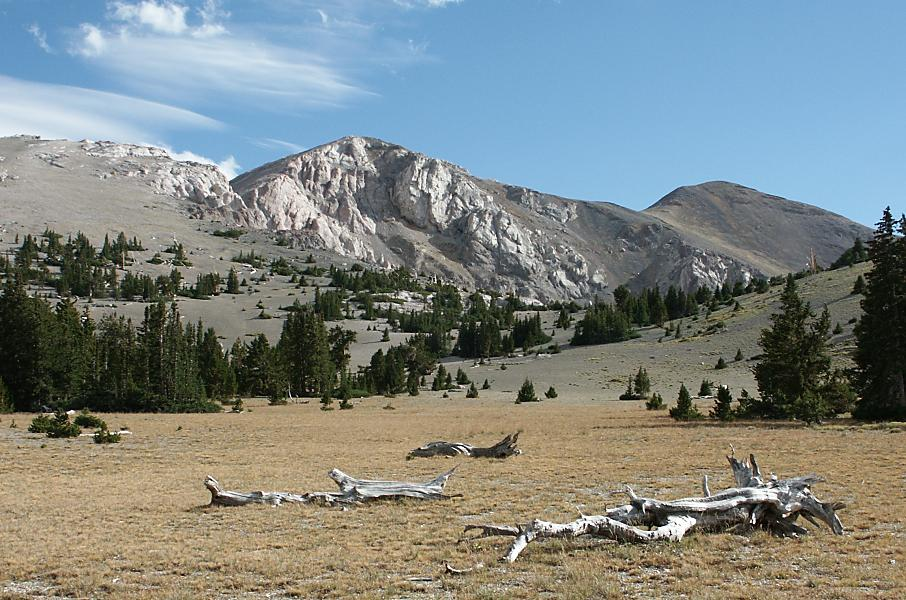
Snake Range

The tectonic mechanisms responsible for lithospheric extension in the Basin and Range province are controversial, and several competing hypotheses attempt to explain them. Key events preceding Basin and Range extension in the western United States include a long period of compression due to the subduction of the Farallon plate under the west coast of the North American continental plate which stimulated the thickening of the crust. Most of the pertinent tectonic plate movement associated with the province occurred in the Neogene period (23.03-2.58 million years ago) and continues to the present. By the Early Miocene sub-epoch (23.03-15.97 million years ago), much of the Farallon plate had been consumed, and the seafloor spreading ridge that separated the Farallon plate from the Pacific plate (Pacific-Farallon Ridge) approached North America. In the Middle Miocene (15.97-11.63 million years ago), the Pacific-Farallon Ridge was subducted beneath North America ending subduction along this part of the Pacific margin; however, the Farallon plate continued to subduct into the mantle. The movement at this boundary divided the Pacific-Farallon Ridge and spawned the San Andreas transform fault, generating an oblique strike-slip component. Today, the Pacific plate moves north-westward relative to North America, a configuration which has given rise to increased shearing along the continental margin.

The tectonic activity responsible for the extension in the Basin and Range is a complex and controversial issue among the geoscience community. The most accepted hypothesis suggests that crustal shearing associated with the San Andreas Fault caused spontaneous extensional faulting similar to that seen in the Great Basin. However, plate movement alone does not account for the high elevation of the Basin and Range region. The western United States is a region of high heat flow which lowers the density of the lithosphere and stimulates isostatic uplift as a consequence. Lithospheric regions characterized by elevated heat flow are weak and extensional deformation can occur over a broad region. Basin and Range extension is therefore thought to be unrelated to the kind of extension produced by mantle upwelling which may cause narrow rift zones, such as those of the Afar triple junction. Geologic processes that elevate heat flow are varied, however some researchers suggest that heat generated at a subduction zone is transferred to the overriding plate as subduction proceeds. Fluids along fault zones then transfer heat vertically through the crust. This model has led to increasing interest in geothermal systems in the Basin and Range, and requires consideration of the continued influence of the fully subducted Farallon plate in the extension responsible for the Basin and Range Province.

=== Metamorphic core complexes ===
In some localities in the Basin and Range, metamorphic basement is visible at the surface. Some of these are metamorphic core complexes (MCC), an idea that was first developed based on studies in this province. A metamorphic core complex occurs when lower crust is brought to the surface as a result of extension. MCCs in the Basin and Range were not interpreted as being related to crustal extension until after the 1960s. Since then, similar deformational patterns have been identified in MCCs in the Basin and Range and has led geologists to examine them as a group of related geologic features formed by crustal extension during the Cenozoic era (66.0 million years ago to present). The study of metamorphic core complexes has provided valuable insight into the extensional processes driving Basin and Range formation.

=== Volcanism ===
Prior to the Eocene Epoch (55.8 ±0.2 to 33.9 ±0.1 Ma) the convergence rate of the Farallon and North American plates was fast, the angle of subduction was shallow, and the slab width was huge. During the Eocene the Farallon plate subduction-associated compressive forces of the Laramide, Sevier and Nevada orogenies ended, plate interactions changed from orthogonal compression to oblique strike-slip, and volcanism in the Basin and Range Province flared up (Mid-Tertiary ignimbrite flare-up). It is suggested that this plate continued to be underthrust until about 19 Ma, at which time it was completely consumed and volcanic activity ceased, in part. Olivine basalt from the oceanic ridge erupted around 17 Ma and extension began.

=== Volcanic areas ===
- Great Basin volcanism:
  - Southwestern Nevada volcanic field (SWNVF)
  - Réveille Range and Lunar Crater volcanic field
  - Indian Peak volcanic field, Nevada/Utah
  - Marysvale volcanic field, Utah
- Mogollon-Datil volcanic field:
  - Bursum
  - Emory
  - Organ (Las Cruces, Doña Ana Mountains, Organ Mountains)
  - Socorro calderas
- The Jemez Lineament:
  - San Carlos volcanic field
  - Springerville volcanic field
  - Red Hill volcanic field
  - Zuni-Bandera volcanic field
  - Mount Taylor volcanic field
  - Jemez volcanic field
- Trans-Pecos volcanic field:
  - Big Bend National Park
  - Davis Mountains

== Mineral resources ==
In addition to small amounts of Nevada petroleum, the Basin and Range Province supplies nearly all the copper and most of the gold, silver, and barite mined in the United States.

== See also ==
- Cascade-Sierra province
- Intermontane Plateaus § Basin and Range Province
- List of United States physiographic regions
- Mesa
- Northern Snake Range metamorphic core complex
