= Intermontane Plateaus =

Physiographic region of the contiguous United States

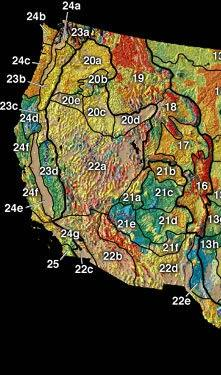
Physiographic regions of the U.S. Interior; the Intermontane Plateaus are marked 20 (Columbia Plateau), 21 (Colorado Plateau) and 22 (Basin and Range).

In the context of physical geography, the Intermontane Plateaus is one of eight physiographic regions of the contiguous United States. The region consists mostly of plateaus and mountain ranges lying between the Rocky Mountains on the east and the Cascade and Sierra Nevada Mountains on the west. It is subdivided into three physiographic provinces: the Columbia Plateau in the north, the Basin and Range Province in the central and southwestern portions, and the Colorado Plateau in the southeast. In turn, each of these provinces are each subdivided into a number of physiographic sections.

== Physiographic provinces ==
=== Columbia Plateau Province ===
The Columbia Plateau Province is a large igneous province of flood basalts erupted in Miocene and early Pliocence epochs across the states of Washington, Oregon, Idaho, Nevada, and California.

=== Colorado Plattiary erosion landforms ===
The province was uplifted and divided into great blocks by faults or monoclinal flexures which were exposed to long-lasting denudation in a mid-Tertiary cycle of erosion. They were then broadly elevated again with renewed movement on some of the faults. The current erosion cycle started in the late Tertiary, when the deep canyons of the region were trenched. The results of the first cycle of erosion are seen in the widespread exposure of the resistant Carboniferous limestone as a broad platform in the southwestern area of greater uplift through central Arizona where the less resistant overlying formations have been eroded away. They are also seen in the development of a series of cuestas: huge, south-facing, retreating escarpments of irregular outline on the edges of the higher formations farther north. Each escarpment stands forth where a resistant formation overlies a weaker, less resistant one. Each escarpment is separated from the next higher one by a broad step of weaker strata.

A series of these geologic formations occurs in southern Utah, where in passing northward from the Carboniferous platform one ascends in succession the Chocolate Cliffs (Triassic sandstones), Vermilion and White Cliffs (Jurassic sandstones), the Gray Cliffs (Cretaceous sandstones, of remarkably cross-bedded structure, interpreted as the dunes of an ancient desert), and finally the Pink Cliffs (Eocene strata of fluviatile and lacustrine origin) of the high, forested plateaus. Associated with these irregular escarpments are occasional rectilinear ridges, the work of extensive erosion on monoclinal structures. A good example of this is Echo Cliffs lying east of the Painted Desert. The Mogollon Rim escarpment is part of the transition zone between the Mogollon Plateau of the Colorado Plateau Province and the Sonoran Desert of the Basin and Range Province.

With the renewal of uplift by which the earlier cycle of erosion was interrupted and the present cycle introduced, inequalities of surface due to renewed faulting were again introduced. These still appear as cliffs, of more nearly rectilinear front than the retreating escarpments formed in the previous cycle. These cliffs are peculiar in gradually passing from one formation to another, and in having a height dependent on the displacement of the fault rather than on the structures in the fault face. They are already somewhat battered and dissected by erosion. The most important line of cliffs of this class is associated with the western and southern boundary of the Plateau Province where it was uplifted from the lower ground. The few rivers of the region must have reached the quiescence of old age in the earlier cycle, but were revived by uplift to a vigorous youth in the current cycle. It is to this newly introduced cycle of physiographic evolution that the deep canyons of the Plateau province are due. Thus the Virgin River, a northern tributary of the Colorado River, has cut a vertical slit, 1000 ft. deep, hardly wider at the top than at the bottom, in the heavy Triassic sandstones of southern Utah. However the most famous example is the Grand Canyon of Arizona, eroded by the Colorado river across the uplifted platform of Carboniferous limestone.

During the current cycle of erosion, several of the faults, whose scarps had been worn away in the previous cycle, have been brought to light again as topographic features by the removal of the weak strata along one side of the fault line, leaving the harder strata on the other side in relief. Such scarps are known as fault-line scarps, in distinction from the original fault scarps. They are peculiar in having their altitude dependent on the depth of revived erosion, instead of the amount of faulting, and they are sometimes topographically reversed, in that the revived scarp overlooks a lowland worn on a weak formation in the upheaved fault-block. Another consequence of revived erosion is seen in the occurrence of great landslides, where the removal of weak (Permian) clays has sapped the face of the Vermilion Cliffs, so that huge slices of the cliff face have slid down and forward 1–2 miles (1.6–3.2 km), all shattered into a confused tumult of forms for a 20 miles (32 km) or more along the cliff base.

==== Volcanic features ====
Volcanic features occur in abundance in the Plateau province. Some of the high plateaus in the north are capped with remnants of heavy lava flows of early eruption. A group of large volcanoes occurs on the limestone platform south of the Grand Canyon, culminating in Mount San Francisco (Humphreys Peak) (12,794 feet (3,900 m), a moderately dissected cone, and associated with many more recent smaller cones and freshlooking lava flows. Mount Taylor in western New Mexico is of similar age, but here dissection seems to have advanced farther, probably because of the weaker nature of the underlying rocks. The dissection has resulted in removing the smaller cones and exposing many lava conduits or pipes in the form of volcanic necks or buttes. The Henry Mountains in southwestern Utah are peculiar in owing their relief to the doming or blistering up of the plateau strata by the underground intrusion of large bodies or cisterns (laccolites) of lava, now more or less exposed by erosion.

=== Basin and Range Province ===
The large Basin and Range Province is a basin and range topography resulting from crustal extension (extensional tectonics). It is located in all or parts of Oregon, Idaho, Nevada, California, Utah, New Mexico, Arizona in the Western United States; and Sonora, Chihuahua, Sinaloa, and other states southwards to the Trans-Mexican Volcanic Belt in Mexico. It involves some novel problems in its description, especially in Southern California and central Mexico.

The province is characterized by numerous disconnected mountain ranges trending north and south, from 30–100 miles (48–161 km) in length, the higher ranges reaching altitudes of 8,000–10,000 feet (2,400–3,000 m), separated by broad, intermontane desert plains or basins at altitudes varying from sea-level (or a little less) in the southwest, to 4,000–5,000 feet (1,200–1,500 m) farther inland. It is an arid region.

Many of the intermontane plains, occurring mostly in the north, appear to be heavily aggraded with mountain waste. Others, mostly in the south, are valleys also heavily aggraded by mountain erosion. The structure of the region previous to faulting was dependent on long antecedent processes of accumulation and deformation and the surface of the region then was dependent on the amount of erosion suffered in the prefaulting cycle.

When the region was broken into fault blocks and the blocks were uplifted and tilted, the back slope of each block was a part of the previously eroded surface and the face of the block was a surface of fracture. The present form of the higher blocks is more or less affected by erosion since faulting, while many of the lower blocks have been buried under the waste of the higher ones.

==== Northern areas ====
In the north, where dislocations have invaded the field of the horizontal Columbian lavas, as in southeastern Oregon and northeastern California, the blocks are monoclinal in structure as well as in attitude. Here, the amount of dissection is relatively moderate, for some of the fault faces are described as ravined but not yet deeply dissected. Hence these dislocations appear to be of recent date.

==== Central areas ====
In the Great Basin of western Utah and through most of Nevada, many of the blocks exhibit deformed structures involving folds and faults of relatively ancient (Jurassic) date. In fact so ancient that the mountains formed by the folding were worn down to the lowland stage of old age before the block-faulting occurred. When this old-mountain lowland was broken into blocks and the blocks were tilted, their attitude, but not their structure, was monoclinal.

In this new attitude, they have been so maturely re-dissected in the current new cycle of erosion as to have gained elaborately carved forms in which the initial form of the uplifted blocks can hardly be perceived. Some of them still retain along one side the highly significant feature of a relatively simple base-line, transecting hard and soft structures alike indicating the faulted margin of a tilted block.

Here the less uplifted blocks are now heavily aggraded with waste from the dissected ranges. The waste takes the form of huge alluvial fans, formed chiefly by occasional boulder-bearing floods from the mountains. Each fan heads in a ravine at the mountain base and becomes laterally confluent with adjacent fans as it stretches several miles forward with decreasing slope and increasing fineness of material.

==== Southern areas ====
In the upper southern part of the Basin and Range Province, in the Mojave Desert of California, and Sonoran Desert of southern California and Arizona (U.S.) and northern Sonora (Mexico) states, the ranges are well dissected and some of the intermontane depressions have rock floors with gentle, centripetal slopes. This area also has huge alluvial fans, with heads at canyons exiting the mountains, and laterally confluent with adjacent fans as they extend for miles with rather consistent slopes.

The Basin and Range Province extends southeast down into Chihuahua state in northeast Mexico, and far south along the Mexican Plateau to central Mexico at the Trans-Mexican Volcanic Belt.

==== Drainage basins ====
Only a small part of the Basin and Range province is drained to the sea. A few intermont areas in the north-west part of the province have outlets westward via the Klamath River through the Cascade range. The Sacramento and San Joaquin Rivers from the Sierra Nevada pass through the Central Valley and California Coast Ranges to San Francisco Bay. A few basins in the southeast have outlet by the Rio Grande to the Gulf of Mexico.

===== Colorado River watershed =====
A much larger but still narrow medial area is drained southwestward by the Colorado River to the head of the Gulf of California, where this large and very turbid river has formed the extensive Colorado River Delta, north of which the former head of the gulf is now cut off from the sea and laid bare by evaporation as a plain below sea-level.

It is in the Lower Colorado River Valley that an irrigation project, involving the diversion of some of the river water to the low plain of the Imperial Valley, led to disaster in 1904. The river flooded through a deliberately engineered breach of the Alamo Canal and flowed across the Imperial Valley plain into the Salton Sink, forming the Salton Sea. The endorheic Salton Sea remains, now supplied by subterranean flow from over-irrigated fields draining into the aquifer.

===== Seasonal streams—lakes =====
Many streams descend from the ravines only to wither away on the desert basin floors before uniting in a trunk river along the axis of a depression. Others succeed in uniting in the winter season, when evaporation is much reduced, and then their trunk flows for several additional miles only to disappear by sinking (evaporating) farther on. A few of the large streams, such as the Mojave River, when in flood may spread out in a temporary shallow sheet on a dead level of clay, or playa, in a basin center, but the sheet of water vanishes in the warm season (dry lake) and the stream shrinks far up its course, the absolutely barren clay floor of the playa, impassable when wet, becomes firm enough for crossing when dry.

One of the southwestern basins, with its floor below sea-level, has a plain of salt in its center. A few of the basins are occupied by endorheic lakes without outlet, of which Great Salt Lake, in north-west Utah, is the largest. Other examples are Owens Lake and Mono Lake in California.

Several smaller lakes occur in the basins of western Nevada, immediately east of the Sierra Nevada. During Pleistocene times all these lacustrine basins were occupied by lakes of much greater depth and larger size. The outlines of the eastern Lake Bonneville and the western Lake Lahontan water bodies are well recorded by shore lines and deltas on the enclosing slopes, hundreds of feet above the present lake surfaces. The abandoned shore lines have yielded evidence of past climatic changes second in importance only to those of the Pleistocene glaciated areas. The duration of the Pleistocene lakes was brief as compared with the time since the dislocation of the faulted blocks, as is shown by the small dimensions of the lacustrine beaches compared to the great volume of the ravine-heading fans on which the beaches often lie.

== Intermediate Province ==
The Intermediate Province is located in parts of Washington, Oregon and Idaho.

=== Lava plains ===
The lava plains of the Columbia River Basin are among the most extensive volcanic outpourings in the world. They cover over 210,000 square kilometres (81,000 mi^{2}) in southeastern Washington, eastern Oregon, and southwestern Idaho, and are 4,000 feet (1,200 m) deep in some river gorges.

The lava completely buries the pre-existent land forms over most of its extent. Some of the flows are still so young as to preserve their scoriaceous surface. Here, the shore-line of the lava contours evenly around the spurs and enters, bay-like, into the valleys of the enclosing mountains, occasionally isolating an outlying mass. Other parts of the lava flood are much older and have been more or less deformed and eroded. Thus the uplifted, dislocated and dissected lava sheets of Yellowstone National Park in the Rocky Mountains on the east (at the headwaters of the Snake River) are associated with the older lavas of the Columbian plains.

==== River canyons ====
The Columbia River has entrenched itself in a canyon-like valley around the northern and Western side of the lava plains. The Snake River has cut a deeper canyon farther southeast where the plains are higher and has disclosed the many lava sheets which build up the plains, occasionally revealing a buried mountain in which the superposed river has cut an even narrower canyon. One of the most remarkable features of the Intermediate Province is seen in the temporary course taken by the Columbia River across the plains, while its canyon was obstructed by Pleistocene glaciers that came from the Cascade Range on the northwest. The river followed the temporary course long enough to erode a deep gorge, known as Grand Coulee, along part of its length.

== See also ==
- Intermountain West
- Central Basin and Range ecoregion — Level III ecoregion (EPA)
- Northern Basin and Range ecoregion — Level III ecoregion (EPA)
- United States physiographic region
