= Physiographic region =

Classification system for Earth's landforms based on the work on N. M. Fenneman

Physiographic regions are a means of defining Earth's landforms into independently distinct, mutually exclusive areas, independent of political boundaries. It is based upon the classic three-tiered approach by Nevin M. Fenneman in 1916, that separates landforms into physiographic divisions, physiographic provinces, and physiographic sections.

The classification mechanism has become a popular geographical tool in the United States, indicated by the publication of a USGS shapefile that maps the regions of the original work and the National Park Service's use of the terminology to describe the regions in which its parks are located.

Originally used in North America, the model became the basis for similar classifications of other continents.

== Physiography ==
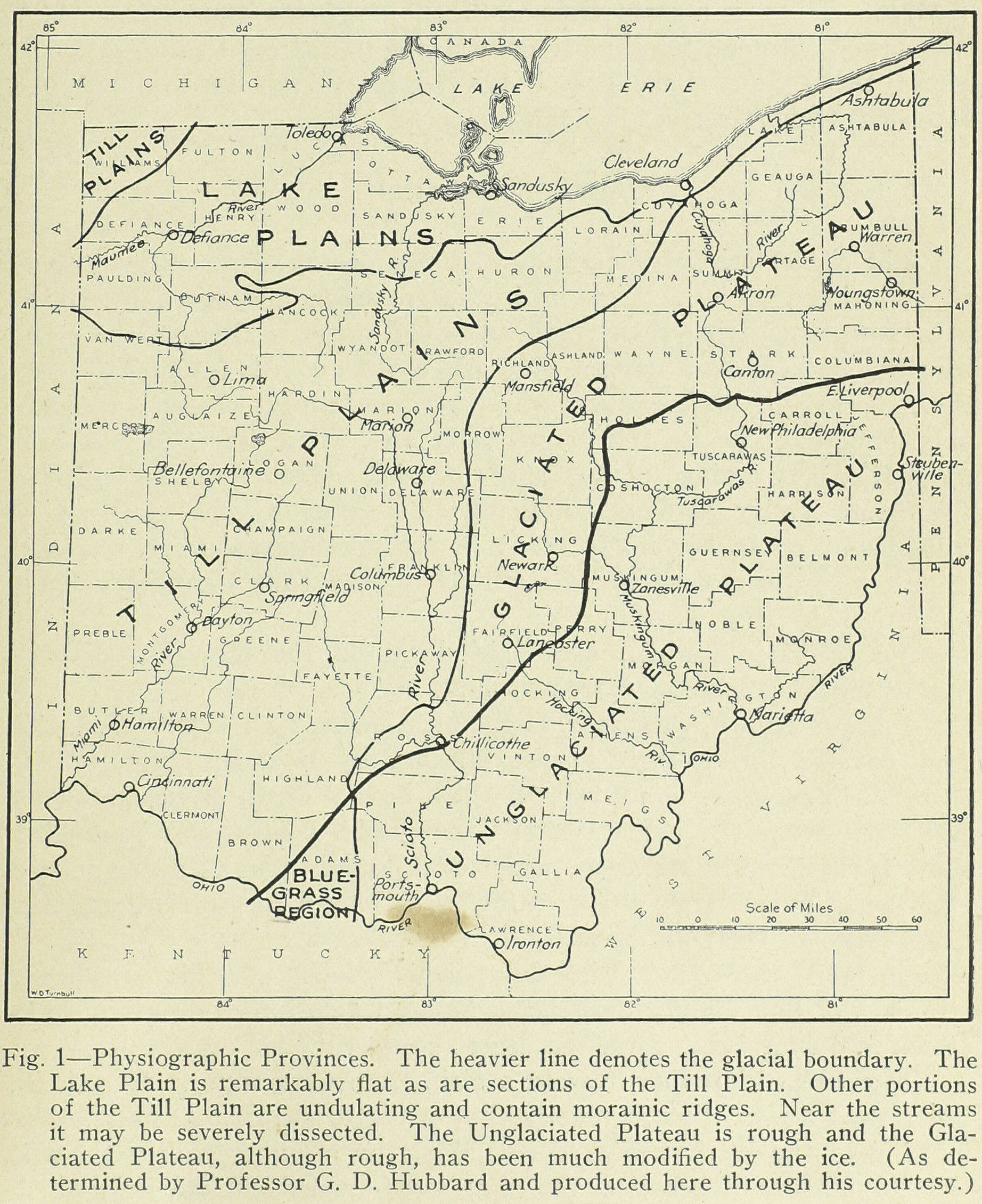
Physiographic Map from "Geography of Ohio," published in 1923

During the early 1900s, the study of regional-scale geomorphology was termed "physiography". Physiography later was considered to be a portmanteau of "physical" and "geography", and therefore synonymous with physical geography, and the concept became embroiled in controversy surrounding the appropriate concerns of that discipline. Some geomorphologists held to a geological basis for physiography and emphasized a concept of physiographic regions while a conflicting trend among geographers was to equate physiography with "pure morphology," separated from its geological heritage. In the period f World War II, the emergence of process, climatic, and quantitative studies led to a preference by many Earth scientists for the term "geomorphology" in order to suggest an analytical approach to landscapes rather than a descriptive one. In current usage, physiography still lends itself to confusion as to which meaning is meant, the more specialized "geomorphological" definition or the more encompassing "physical geography" definition.

For the purposes of physiographic mapping, landforms are classified according to both their geologic structures and histories. Distinctions based on geologic

distinctions where the forms are so recent as to be in their first erosion cycle, as is generally the case with sheets of glacial drift. Generally, forms which result from similar histories are characterized by certain similar features, and differences in history result in corresponding differences of form, usually resulting in distinctive features which are obvious to the casual observer, but this is not always the case. A maturely dissected plateau may grade without a break from rugged mountains on the one hand to mildly rolling farm lands on the other. So also, forms which are not classified together may be superficially similar; for example, a young coastal plain and a peneplain. In a large number of cases, the boundary lines are also geologic lines, due to differences in the nature or structure of the underlying rocks.[1]

== History ==
=== 19th century ===
The history of "physiography" itself is at best a complicated effort. Much of the complications arise from how the term has evolved over time, both as its own 'science' and as a synonym for other branches of science. In 1848, Mary Somerville published her book Physical Geography which gave detailed descriptions of the topography of each continent, along with the distribution of plant, animals and humans. This work gave impetus to further works along the field. In Germany, Oscar Peschel in 1870, proposed that geographers should study the morphology of the Earth's surface, having an interest in the study of landforms for the development of human beings. As the chair of geography (and a geologist by training) in Bonn, Germany, Ferdinand von Richthofen made the study of landforms the main research field for himself and his students. Elsewhere, Thomas Henry Huxley's Physiography was published in 1877 in Britain. Shortly after, the field of "physical geography" itself was renamed as "physiography". Afterwards, physiography became a very popular school subject in Britain, accounting for roughly 10% of all examination papers in both English and Welsh schools, and physiography was now regarded as an integral, if not the most important aspect of geography.

In conjunction with these 'advances' in physiography, physically and visually mapping these descriptive areas was underway as well. The early photographers and balloonists, Nadar and Triboulet, experimented with aerial photography and the view it provided of the landscape. In 1899, Albert Heim published his photographs and observations made during a balloon flight over the Alps; he is probably the first person to use aerial photography in geomorphological or physiographical research. The block diagrams of Fenneman, Raisz, Lobeck and many others were based in part upon both aerial photography and topographic maps, giving an oblique "birds-eye" view.

=== 20th century ===
By 1901, there were clear differences in the definition of the term physiography. "In England, physiography is regarded as the introduction to physical science in general. It is made to include the elements of physics, chemistry, astronomy, physical geography, and geology, and sometimes even certain phases of botany and zoology. In America, the term has a somewhat different meaning. It is sometimes used as a synonym for physical geography, and is sometimes as the science which describes and explains the physical features of the earth's surface".

By 1911, the definition of physiography in Encyclopædia Britannica had evolved to be "In popular usage the words 'physical geography' have come to mean geography viewed from a particular standpoint rather than any special department of the subject. The popular meaning is better conveyed by the word physiography, a term which appears to have been introduced by Linnaeus, and was reinvented as a substitute for the cosmography of the Middle Ages by Professor Huxley. Although the term has since been limited by some writers to one particular part of the subject, it seems best to maintain the original and literal meaning. In the stricter sense, physical geography is that part of geography which involves the processes of contemporary change in the crust and the circulation of the fluid envelopes. It thus draws upon physics for the explanation of the phenomena with the space-relations of which it is specially concerned. Physical geography naturally falls into three divisions, dealing respectively with the surface of the lithosphere – geomorphology; the hydrosphere – oceanography; and the atmosphere – climatology. All these rest upon the facts of mathematical geography, and the three are so closely inter-related that they cannot be rigidly separated in any discussion".

The 1919 edition of The Encyclopedia Americana: A Library of Universal Knowledge further adjusted the definition to be "Physiography (geomorphology), now generally recognized as a science distinct from geology, deals with the origins and development of land forms, traces out the topographic expression of structure, and embodies a logical history of oceanic basins, and continental elevations; of mountains, plateaus and plains; of hills and valleys. Physical geography is used loosely as a synonym, but the term is more properly applied to the borderland between geography and physiography; dealing, as it does, largely with the human element as influenced by its physiographic surroundings".

=== 21st century ===
Even in the 21st century, some confusion remains as to exactly what "physiography" is. One source states "Geomorphology includes quaternary geology, physiography and most of physical geography", treating physiography as a separate field, but subservient to geomorphology. Another source states "Geomorphology (or physiography) refers to the study of the surface features of the earth. It involves looking at the distribution of land, water, soil and rock material that forms the land surface. Land is closely linked to the geomorphology of a particular landscape", regarding physiography as synonymous with geomorphology. Yet another source states "Physiography may be viewed from two distinct angles, the one dynamic, the other passive". The same source continues by stating "In a large fashion geodynamics is intimately associated with certain branches of geology, as sedimentation, while geomorphology connects physiography with geography. The dynamic interlude representing the active phase of physiography weaves the basic threads of geologic history." The U.S. Geological Survey defines physiography as a study of "Features and attributes of earth's land surface", while geomorphology is defined separately as "Branch of geology dealing with surface land features and the processes that create and change them".

Partly due to this confusion over what "physiography" actually means, some scientists have refrained from using the term physiography (and instead use the similar term geomorphology) because the definitions vary from the American Geological Institute's "the study and classification of the surface features of Earth on the basis of similarities in geologic structure and the history of geologic changes" to descriptions that also include vegetation and/or land use.

== See also ==
- List of physiographic regions
