= List of subranges of the Appalachian Mountains =

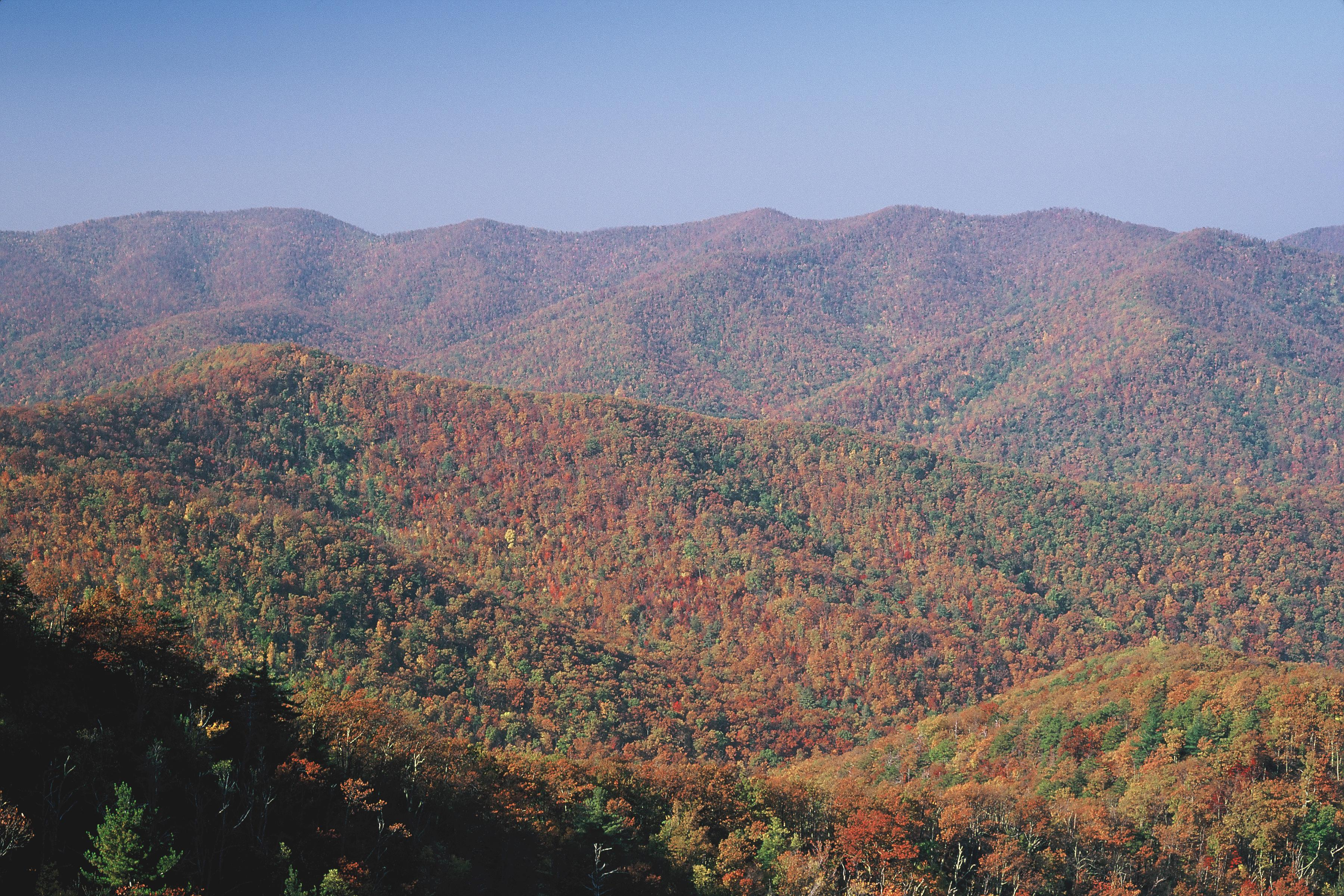
Shenandoah National Park in Virginia

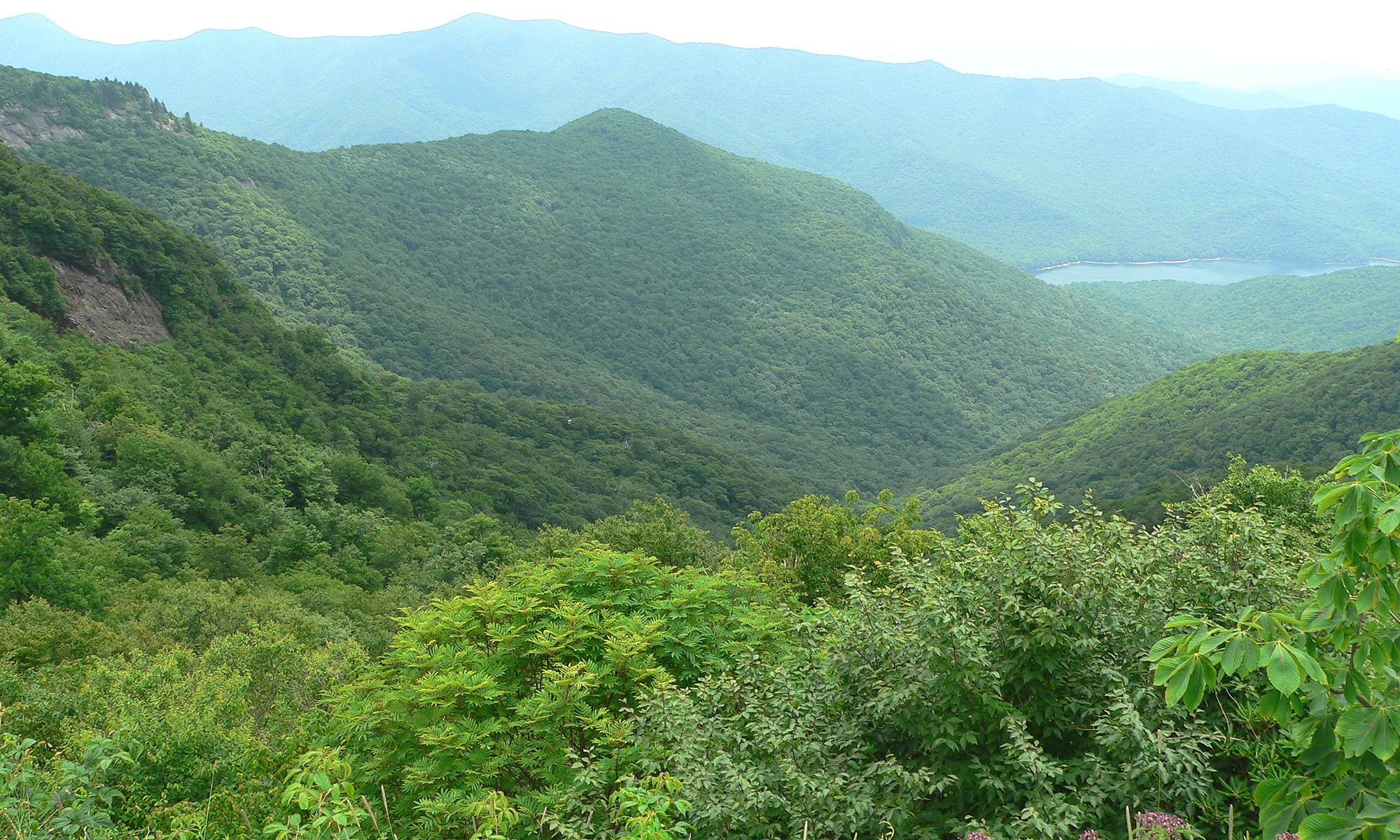
View in the Great Craggy Mountains near the Blue Ridge Parkway in North Carolina

The following is a list of subranges within the Appalachian Mountains, a mountain range stretching ~2,050 miles from Newfoundland and Labrador, Canada to Alabama, US. The Appalachians, at their initial formation, were a part of the larger Central Pangean Mountains along with the Scottish Highlands, the Ouachita Mountains, and the Anti-Atlas Mountains. The modern ranges were formed and/or deformed by the Acadian, Caledonian, Alleghenian, Mauritanide and Variscan orogenies with the Alleghenian orogeny being the most notable to the modern Appalachians.

The Appalachians are also subdivided by a number of large plateaus and additional subplateus. These are commonly not considered subranges although they do contain some features referred to as mountains which are assigned to both their geographic "range" and the more general Appalachian Mountains. These plateaus, such as the Allegheny Plateau, are considered provinces of the Appalachian Highlands and the mountains assigned to them are instead considered pieces of dissected plateaus.

Additionally, subranges and ridges of subranges (Such as the Yew Mountains) are inconsistently related to the Appalachian Mountain Range. No clear distinction exists as to what units qualify as directly related subranges of the Appalachians until the level of mountain. As such, the distinction is often arbitrary and based on personal preference by the geographer or geologist publishing material. This has led to the distinction being largely unrelated to area, geological features, or topography. This list is more comprehensive to account for that variation and includes the parent range of each subrange noted. This list includes physiographic regions, for information of the physiographic regions, provinces, and sections: refer to the Appalachian Highlands page for American sections and the Appalachian Uplands page for Canadian sections.

Due to the lack of solid distinctions in the requirements of an area to be a range, this list includes most physiographic divisions, many larger ridges, plateaus, mountain complexes, most stratigraphic ridges, certain lowlands and uplands, local highlands, and certain other types of geographic and geological features. This list is not a comprehensive list of every peak and summit of the Appalachians, individual mountains, when included, are generally individual politically but not geographically, and each inclusion must meet the set of criteria used to define a subrange.

== List of subranges ==
Name	Parent range	Administrative location	Highest elevation	Total area	Midpoint coordinates
Appalachian Mountains	Central Pangean Mountains	United States and Canada	6,684 ft (2,037 m)	736,888 mi^{2} (1,908,539 km^{2})	37°6′N 76°18′W
Appalachian Highlands	Appalachian Mountains	United States	6,684 ft (2,037 m)	615,150 mi^{2} (1,593,231 km^{2})	40°N 78°W
Appalachian Uplands	Appalachian Mountains	Canada	4,186 ft (1,276 m)	121,741 mi^{2} (315,308 km^{2})	42°21′N 67°16′W
Appalachian Plateau	Appalachian Highlands	New York, Pennsylvania, Ohio, Maryland, West Virginia, Virginia, Kentucky, Tennessee, Alabama, and Georgia.			
Blue Ridge Mountains	Appalachian Highlands	Pennsylvania, Maryland, West Virginia, Virginia, North Carolina, South Carolina, Tennessee, and Georgia.			
Ridge-and-Valley Appalachians	Appalachian Highlands	New York, New Jersey, Pennsylvania, Maryland, West Virginia, Virginia, Kentucky, Tennessee, Georgia, and Alabama.			
Piedmont	Appalachian Highlands	New York, New Jersey, Pennsylvania, Delaware, Maryland, District of Columbia, Virginia, North Carolina, South Carolina, Georgia, and Alabama			
St. Lawrence Valley	Appalachian Highlands	Vermont and New York			
New England	Appalachian Highlands	Maine, New Hampshire, Vermont, Massachusetts, Rhode Island, Connecticut, New York, New Jersey, and Pennsylvania			
Adirondack Mountains	Appalachian Highlands	New York			
Newfoundland Highlands	Appalachian Uplands	Newfoundland and Labrador	2,664 ft (812 m)	13,125 mi^{2} (33,994 km^{2})	49°36′N 57°25′W
Annapolis Lowland	Appalachian Uplands	Nova Scotia			
Atlantic Uplands	Appalachian Uplands	Newfoundland and Labrador and Nova Scotia			
Chaleur Uplands	Appalachian Uplands	Quebec and New Brunswick			
Eastern Quebec Uplands	Appalachian Uplands	Quebec			
Nova Scotia Highlands	Appalachian Uplands	Nova Scotia			
New Brunswick Highlands	Appalachian Uplands	New Brunswick			
Notre Dame and Mégantic Mountains	Appalachian Uplands**	Quebec			
Notre Dame Mountains	Appalachian Uplands (Ntl. Gov.) or Notre Dame and Mégantic Mountains (Quebec)**	Quebec and New Brunswick			
Megantic Hills	Appalachian Uplands (Ntl. Gov.) or Notre Dame and Mégantic Mountains (Quebec)**	Quebec			
Maritime Plain	Appalachian Uplands	New Brunswick and Nova Scotia			
Sutton Mountains	Appalachian Uplands	Quebec			
Eastern Kentucky Mountains	Appalachian Plateau, Cumberland Plateau, and Cumberland Mountains	Kentucky			
Mohawk Plateau	Appalachian Plateau	New York			
Catskill Mountains	Appalachian Plateau	New York			
Cumberland Mountains	Appalachian Plateau	Virginia, West Virginia, Kentucky, and Tennessee			
Cumberland Plateau	Appalachian Plateau	Kentucky, Tennessee, Georgia, and Alabama			
Kanawha	Appalachian Plateau	New York, Ohio, Pennsylvania, West Virginia, Kentucky, and Virginia			
Southern New York	Appalachian Plateau	New York, Ohio, and Pennsylvania			
Allegheny Plateau	Appalachian Plateau	New York, Ohio, Pennsylvania, West Virginia, and Kentucky			
Allegheny Mountains	Appalachian Plateau	Pennsylvania, Maryland, and West Virginia	4,861 ft (1,482 m)	15,628 mi^{2} (40,476 km^{2})	39°13′N 79°54′W
Hudson Valley	Ridge-and-Valley Appalachians	New York			
Middle Ridge and Valley Appalachians	Ridge-and-Valley Appalachians	Pennsylvania, New Jersey, Maryland, West Virginia, and Virginia			
Tennessee Ridge and Valley Appalachians	Ridge-and-Valley Appalachians	Kentucky, Virginia, Tennessee, Georgia, and Alabama			
Northern Blue Ridge Mountains	Blue Ridge Mountains	Pennsylvania, Maryland, West Virginia, and Virginia			
Southern Blue Ridge Mountains	Blue Ridge Mountains	Virginia, Tennessee, North Carolina, South Carolina, and Georgia			
Piedmont Uplands	Piedmont	Pennsylvania, New Jersey, Maryland, the District of Columbia, Virginia, North Carolina, South Carolina, Georgia, and Alabama			
Piedmont Lowlands	Piedmont	New York, Pennsylvania, New Jersey, Maryland, and Virginia			
Champlain Valley	St. Lawrence Valley	New York and Vermont			
Northern St. Lawrence Valley	St. Lawrence Valley	New York			
Seaboard Lowlands	New England	Maine, New Hampshire, Massachusetts, Connecticut, and Rhode Island			
New England Uplands	New England	New York, Connecticut, New Jersey, and Pennsylvania			
White Mountains	New England	Maine and New Hampshire			
Green Mountains	New England	Vermont, Massachusetts, and Connecticut			
Taconic Mountains	New England	Vermont, New York, Massachusetts, and Connecticut			
Long Range Mountains	Newfoundland Highlands	Newfoundland and Labrador	2,664 ft (812 m)	13,125 mi^{2} (33,994 km^{2})	49°36′N 57°25′W
Newfoundland Central Lowlands	Newfoundland Highlands	Newfoundland and Labrador			
Atlantic Uplands of Newfoundland	Atlantic Uplands and Newfoundland Highlands	Newfoundland and Labrador			
Atlantic Uplands of Nova Scotia	Atlantic Uplands	Nova Scotia			
Cobequid Highlands	Maritime Plain and Nova Scotia Highlands	Nova Scotia	1,198 ft (365 m)	2,795 mi^{2} 7,239 km^{2}	45°39′N 63°48′W
Cape Breton Highlands	Maritime Plain and Atlantic Uplands of Nova Scotia	Nova Scotia	1,749 ft (533 m)	4,521 mi^{2} (11,508 km^{2})	46°18′N 60°41′W
Fundy Highlands	Maritime Plain and New Brunswick Highlands	New Brunswick	1,345+ ft (410+ m)	7,211 mi^{2} (18,677 km^{2})	46°8′N 65°0′W
Chic-Choc Mountains	Notre Dame Mountains	Quebec	4,186 ft (1,276 m)	10,020 mi^{2} (25,952 km^{2})	48°36′N 66°2′W
Central Notre Dame Mountains	Notre Dame Mountains	Quebec	2,972 ft (906 m)	9,252 mi^{2} (23,962 km^{2})	47°49′N 68°29′W
Southern Notre Dame Mountains	Notre Dame Mountains	Quebec	3,005 ft (916 m)	8,480 mi^{2} (21,962 km^{2})	46°25′N 71°12′W
Eastern Kentucky Coalfield	Eastern Kentucky Mountains and the Cumberland Plateau	Kentucky			
Pottsville Escarpment	Eastern Kentucky Mountains and the Cumberland Plateau	Kentucky	1,800 ft		
Waverly Escarpment	Eastern Kentucky Mountains	Kentucky	1,300 ft		
Pine Mountain	Eastern Kentucky Mountains and Cumberland Mountains	Kentucky, Virginia, and Tennessee	1,700 ft (518 m)		36°53′30.98″N 83°17′18.08″W
Log Mountains	Eastern Kentucky Mountains	Kentucky and Tennessee			
Catskill Escarpment	Catskill Mountains	New York			
Blackhead Mountains	Catskill Mountains	New York			
Northwest Catskills	Catskill Mountains				
Northeast Catskills	Catskill Mountains				
Devil's Path	Catskill Mountains	New York			
Central Catskills	Catskill Mountains				
Southwest Catskills	Catskill Mountains				
Burroughs Range	Catskill Mountains	New York			
Southern Catskills	Catskill Mountains				
Cumberland Mountain	Cumberland Mountains	Virginia and Tennessee	3,500 ft (1,100 m)		
Crab Orchard Mountains	Cumberland Mountains	Tennessee	3,340 ft (1,018 m)		
Walden Ridge	Cumberland Plateau	Tennessee	3,048 ft (929 m)		
Lookout Mountain	Cumberland Plateau	Georgia	2,389 ft (728 m)		34°51′49″N 85°23′33″W
Sand Mountain	Cumberland Plateau and Armuchee Ridges	Alabama and Georgia			
Allegheny Front	Allegheny Mountains	Pennsylvania, Maryland, and West Virginia	4,770 feet (1,450 m)		39°04′23″N 79°17′53″W
Spruce Mountain	Allegheny Mountains	West Virginia	4,863 ft (1,482 m)		38°41′59″N 79°31′58″W
Rich Mountain	Allegheny Mountains	West Virginia			
Briery Mountains	Allegheny Mountains	West Virginia			
Laurel Mountain	Allegheny Mountains	West Virginia			
Laurel Mountain	Allegheny Mountains	Pennsylvania			
Flat Top Mountain	Allegheny Mountains	West Virginia			
Yew Mountains	Allegheny Mountains	West Virginia			
Shavers Fork Mountain Complex	Allegheny Mountains	West Virginia			
Cheat Mountain	Shavers Fork Mountain Complex	West Virginia			
Shavers and Back Allegheny Mountains	Shavers Fork Mountain Complex	West Virginia			
Mount Porte Crayon	Allegheny Mountains	West Virginia			
Dans Mountain	Allegheny Front	Maryland			
Backbone Mountain	Allegheny Mountains	Maryland and West Virginia			
Negro Mountain	Allegheny Mountains	Pennsylvania			
North Fork Mountain	Allegheny Mountains	West Virginia			
Sideling Hill (aka Side Long Hill)	Allegheny Mountains or Middle Ridge-and-Valley Appalachians	Pennsylvania, Maryland, and West Virginia			
Shenandoah Mountain	Middle Ridge-and-Valley Appalachians	West Virginia and Virginia			
Sleepy Creek Mountain	Middle Ridge-and-Valley Appalachians	West Virginia			
The Devil's Nose	Middle Ridge-and-Valley Appalachians	West Virginia			
North Mountain (aka Great Ridge)	Middle Ridge-and-Valley Appalachians	West Virginia and Virginia			
Savage Mountains	Middle Ridge-and-Valley Appalachians	Pennsylvania and Maryland			
Great North Mountain	Middle Ridge-and-Valley Appalachians	West Virginia and Virginia			
Tonoloway Ridge	Middle Ridge-and-Valley Appalachians	Pennsylvania, Maryland, and West Virginia			
Cacapon Mountain	Middle Ridge-and-Valley Appalachians	West Virginia and Virginia			
Third Hill Mountain	Middle Ridge-and-Valley Appalachians	West Virginia			
Patterson Creek Mountain	Middle Ridge-and-Valley Appalachians	West Virginia			
South Branch Mountain	Middle Ridge-and-Valley Appalachians	West Virginia			
Ice Mountain	Middle Ridge-and-Valley Appalachians	West Virginia			
Knobly Mountain	Middle Ridge-and-Valley Appalachians	West Virginia			
Elleber Ridge	Middle Ridge-and-Valley Appalachians	West Virginia			
Peters Mountain	Middle Ridge-and-Valley Appalachians	West Virginia and Virginia			
Ordovician Bald Eagle Formation	Middle Ridge-and-Valley Appalachians	Pennsylvania			
Nittany Arch	Middle Ridge-and-Valley Appalachians	Pennsylvania			
Brush Mountain Ridge	Ordovician Bald Eagle Formation	Pennsylvania			
Bald Eagle Mountain Ridge	Ordovician Bald Eagle Formation and Nittany Arch	Pennsylvania			
Tussey Mountain	Ordovician Bald Eagle Formation and Nittany Arch	Pennsylvania			
Shriner Mountain	Ordovician Bald Eagle Formation and Nittany Arch	Pennsylvania			
Mount Nittany	Nittany Arch	Pennsylvania			
Allegheny Mountain	Middle Ridge-and-Valley Appalachians	Pennsylvania			
Wills Mountain	Middle Ridge-and-Valley Appalachians	Pennsylvania and Maryland			
Tuscarora Mountain	Middle Ridge-and-Valley Appalachians	Pennsylvania			
Jacks Mountain	Middle Ridge-and-Valley Appalachians	Pennsylvania			
Jacks Mountain Anticline	Middle Ridge-and-Valley Appalachians	Pennsylvania			
Stone Mountain	Middle Ridge-and-Valley Appalachians	Pennsylvania			
Seven Mountains Area	Middle Ridge-and-Valley Appalachians	Pennsylvania			
Dunning Mountain	Middle Ridge-and-Valley Appalachians	Pennsylvania			
Kittatinny Mountain	Middle Ridge-and-Valley Appalachians	New Jersey			
Wallpack Ridge	Middle Ridge-and-Valley Appalachians	New York			
Blue Mountains of Pennsylvania	Middle Ridge-and-Valley Appalachians	Pennsylvania			
Shawangunk Mountains	Hudson Ridge-and-Valley Appalachians	New York			
Bays Mountain	Tennessee Ridge-and-Valley Appalachians	Tennessee			
Sharp's Ridge	Tennessee Ridge-and-Valley Appalachians	Tennessee			
Armuchee Ridges	Tennessee Ridge-and-Valley Appalachians	Tennessee			
Taylor Ridge	Armuchee Ridges	Georgia			
White Oak Mountain	Tennessee Ridge-and-Valley Appalachians	Tennessee and Georgia			
Missionary Ridge	Tennessee Ridge-and-Valley Appalachians	Tennessee			
Stringer's Ridge	Tennessee Ridge-and-Valley Appalachians	Tennessee			
Red Mountain	Tennessee Ridge-and-Valley Appalachians	Alabama			
Newman Ridge	Tennessee Ridge-and-Valley Appalachians	Tennessee			
Powell Mountain	Tennessee Ridge-and-Valley Appalachians	Virginia and Tennessee			
Bull Run Mountains	Northern Blue Ridge Mountains	Virginia			
Catoctin Mountain	Northern Blue Ridge Mountains	Maryland and Virginia			
Great Smoky Mountains	Southern Blue Ridge Mountains	North Carolina and Tennessee			
Great Balsam Mountains	Southern Blue Ridge Mountains	North Carolina			
Sauratown Mountains	Southern Blue Ridge Mountains	North Carolina			
Bald Mountains	Southern Blue Ridge Mountains	Tennessee and North Carolina			
Great Craggy Mountains	Southern Blue Ridge Mountains	North Carolina			
Plott Balsams	Southern Blue Ridge Mountains	North Carolina			
Unaka Range	Southern Blue Ridge Mountains	North Carolina			
Roan Highlands	Unaka Range	North Carolina			
Grassy Ridge	Roan Highlands	North Carolina			
Unicoi Mountains	Southern Blue Ridge Mountains	North Carolina			
Iron Mountains	Southern Blue Ridge Mountains	Virginia, Tennessee, and North Carolina			
Holston Mountain	Southern Blue Ridge Mountains	Tennessee			
Grassy Ridge	Southern Blue Ridge Mountains	Georgia			
Black Mountains	Southern Blue Ridge Mountains	North Carolina			
Brushy Mountains	Southern Blue Ridge Mountains	North Carolina			
South Mountains	Piedmont Uplands	North Carolina			
Uwharrie Mountains	Piedmont Uplands	North Carolina			
Broken Hills	Piedmont Uplands	Virginia			
Caraway Mountains	Uwharrie Mountains	North Carolina			
Reading Prong	New England Uplands	Connecticut, New York, Pennsylvania, and New Jersey			
Manhattan Prong	New England Uplands	Connecticut and New York			
South Mountain	Reading Prong	Pennsylvania			
New York – New Jersey Highlands	Reading Prong	New York and New Jersey			
Bearfort Ridge	New York – New Jersey Highlands	New Jersey			
Hudson Highlands	Reading Prong	Hudson Valley, New York			
East Hudson Highlands	Hudson Highlands	New York			
West Hudson Highlands	Hudson Highlands	New York			
Breakneck Ridge	East Hudson Highlands	New York			
Housatonic Highlands	Reading Prong	Connecticut			
Ramapo Mountains	Manhattan Prong	New York and New Jersey			
Trenton Prong	Manhattan Prong or Piedmont Lowlands and Piedmont Highlands	Pennsylvania and New Jersey			
Carter-Moriah Range	White Mountains	New Hampshire			
Cannon–Kinsman Range	White Mountains	New Hampshire			
The Cannon Balls	White Mountains	New Hampshire			
Mahoosuc Range	White Mountains	Maine and New Hampshire			
Franconia Range	White Mountains	New Hampshire			
Franconia Ridge	Franconia Range	New Hampshire			
Presidential Range	White Mountains	New Hampshire			
Montalban Ridge	Presidential Range	New Hampshire			
Bemis Ridge	Montalban Ridge	New Hampshire			
Katahdin Massif	Presidential Range	New Hampshire			
Sandwich Range	White Mountains	New Hampshire			
The Sleepers	White Mountains	New Hampshire			
Mount Shaw Massif Ring Dyke	White Mountains	New Hampshire			
Ossipee Mountains	White Mountains	New Hampshire			
Baldface-Royce Range	White Mountains	New Hampshire			
Crescent Range	White Mountains	New Hampshire			
Mahoosuc Range	White Mountains	New Hampshire			
Pilot Range	White Mountains	New Hampshire			
Sandwich Range	White Mountains	New Hampshire			
Twin Range	White Mountains	New Hampshire			
Northeast Kingdom	Green Mountains*	Vermont			
Taconic Allochthon	Taconic Mountains	New York, Vermont, Massachusetts, and Connecticut			
South Taconics	Taconic Mountains	New York, Massachusetts, and Connecticut			
Upper Hoosic River Valley Region	Taconic Mountains	Massachusetts			
Southern Vermont	Taconic Mountains	Vermont			
Northern Terminus	Taconic Mountains	Vermont			
Anguille Mountains	Long Range Mountains	Newfoundland and Labrador			
Lewis Hills	Long Range Mountains	Newfoundland and Labrador			
Tablelands	Long Range Mountains	Newfoundland and Labrador			

* Colloquially, all mountains in Vermont are referred to as the Green Mountains, although not all are a part of the geological range. The Northeast Kingdom is not in the range, but is considered as containing Green Mountains

** The Canadian government considers the Megantic Hills and Notre Dame Mountains as two physiographic provinces within the Appalachian Uplands region. Conversely, the government of Quebec considers the Notre Dame and Mégantic Mountains to be a physiographic region and does not recognize the Appalachian Uplands. This list primarily uses the Canadian Geological Survey's dictations on physiographic regions, divisions, sections, and subsections.

== See also ==
- List of mountains of the Appalachians
- List of mountains in Georgia
- List of mountains in Maryland
- List of mountains in Massachusetts
- List of mountains of Canada
- List of mountains of New Hampshire
- List of mountains of New York (state)
- List of mountains in North Carolina
- List of mountains of the United States
- List of mountains of Vermont
- List of mountains in Virginia
