= Davis Creek =

Davis Creek may refer to:

- Davis Creek, California, an unincorporated community
- Davis Creek (Blackwater River), a stream in Missouri
- Davis Creek (Salt River), a stream in Missouri
- Davis Creek Township, Valley County, Nebraska, a township
- Davis Creek, West Virginia, an unincorporated community
- Davis Creek (Pend Oreille River), a stream in Washington
- Davis Creek (Guyandotte River), a stream in West Virginia
- Davis Creek (Kanawha River), a stream in West Virginia
- Davis Creek (Lake Erie), a watershed administered by the Long Point Region Conservation Authority, that drains into Lake Erie
