= Appalachian Highlands =

Physiographic division of the United States

Coordinates: 40°N 78°W

The Appalachian Highlands is one of eight government-defined physiographic divisions of the contiguous United States. It links with the Appalachian Uplands in Canada to make up the Appalachian Mountains. The Highlands includes seven physiographic provinces, which is the second level in the physiographic classification system in the United States. At the next level of physiographic classification, called section/subsection, there are 20 unique land areas with one of the provinces having no sections. (Note: A physiographic region has a distinct type of landscape, landforms, rock type, and evolutionary history. The advantage of using physiographic regions in the exploration of geography is that all land areas are included. The borders do not overlap, and there are no undefined land areas. It is possible to make a map of any country using the coordinates in the classifications.)

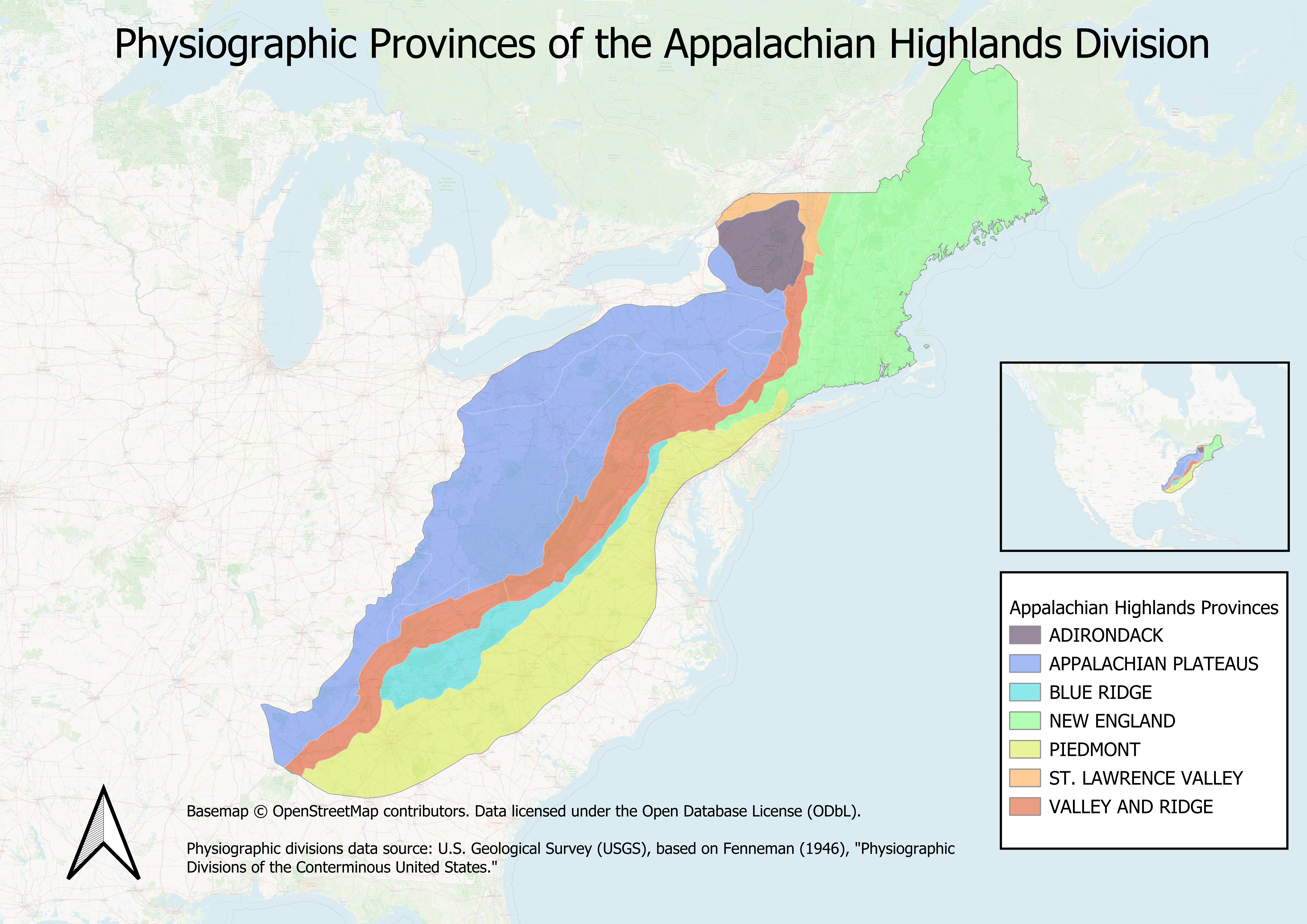

The Appalachian Highlands are characterized by a diverse physiographic division.

The seven provinces are:

- Adirondack
- Appalachian Plateau
- Blue Ridge
- Piedmont
- New England
- St. Lawrence
- Valley and Ridge

== Adirondack province ==
The Adirondack Mountains are a circular dome of mountains in Northeastern New York about 160 miles wide with more than 100 peaks, at least 40 that are over 4,000 feet tall. There are over 200 named lakes, with the number of smaller lakes, ponds, and other bodies of water reaching over 3,000. The region has over 1,200 miles of river. The current relief owes much to glaciation. Among the named lakes around the mountains, are Lake George, Lake Placid, and Lake Tear of the Clouds, which is the source of the Hudson River.

The Adirondack High Peaks are a list of 46 mountains in the Adirondacks that are above or close to 4,000 feet in elevation. The list was created when it was believed that all 46 peaks were at least 4,000 feet tall. Later surveys showed that four of the peaks are actually lower than 4,000 feet. One 4,000 foot peak was also not included in the original list. The tallest peak is Mount Marcy, which is the highest point in New York at 5,344 feet (1,629 m). Although the mountains are formed from ancient rocks more than one billion years old, geologically, the 160-mile wide dome area, called a massif, is relatively new. Because of this, the Adirondacks have been referred to as "new mountains from old rocks." It is theorized that there is a "hotspot" beneath the region, which causes continued uplift at the rate of 1.5–3 cm annually.

== Appalachian Plateau province ==
The Appalachian Plateau is a large, dissected plateau region in the eastern United States. It extends from New York southwest to Alabama. It runs parallel to Lake Erie on the northwest, but does not include the land adjacent to the Great Lakes. The plateau is composed of sedimentary rocks, including sandstones, conglomerates, and shales, that were deposited during the late Paleozoic Era. These rocks are generally flat-lying, but have been dissected by streams to form a rugged and mountainous terrain. In addition to these sedimentary rocks, beds of coal are locally significant throughout the Appalachian Plateaus, making this area the heart of the American coal industry.

The Appalachian Plateau includes several physiographic sections:

- The Mohawk Plateau is located in the Finger Lakes region of upstate New York. It is characterized by its low relief and rolling hills.
- The Kanawha province contains most of West Virginia, southeastern Ohio, southwestern Pennsylvania, and northeastern Kentucky. The province is named after the Kanawha River, a tributary of the Ohio River.
- The Southern New York provinces begins west of Albany, the south of Buffalo, and runs parallel, but not to the edge of, Lake Erie. It stays south of Cleveland and takes in the northeastern portion of Ohio.
- The Catskill Mountains are located in southeastern New York and are known for their scenic beauty and waterfalls.
- The Allegheny Mountains are located in central Pennsylvania and West Virginia and are the highest mountains in the Appalachian Plateau.
- The Cumberland Mountains are located in southeastern Kentucky and Tennessee and is characterized by its gently rolling hills and dissected valleys.
- The Cumberland Plateau is located in central Alabama and are the southernmost mountains in the Appalachian Plateau.

== Blue Ridge province ==
The Blue Ridge province is a physiographic province of the larger Appalachian Highlands physiographic division. This province is about 580 miles long and consists of northern and southern physiographic sections, which divides near the Roanoke River gap.

The northern section runs along a narrow ridge from just south of Harrisburg, Pennsylvania.

The southern section is a plateau area that stretches to northern Georgia, with the southernmost point near Amicalola Mountain in Dawsonville, Georgia with the westernmost section being near Cohutta Mountain in Murray County, Georgia. The Blue Ridge Mountains are named for their distinctive blue haze, which is caused by the presence of atmospheric pollutants and water vapor. This contributes to the characteristic haze on the mountains and their perceived color.

The mountains are made of highly deformed metamorphic rocks, largely developed during the Precambrian age over 541 million years ago. The mountains include schists, gneisses, slates, and quartzites, and are extensively intruded by igneous bodies. The Blue Ridge Mountains contain the highest mountains in eastern North America south of Baffin Island. The highest peak in the Blue Ridge is Mt. Mitchell in North Carolina at 6,684 feet.

== Piedmont province ==
The Piedmont province is a physiographic province of the larger Appalachian Mountains range. It is located in the eastern United States and stretches about 900 miles from New York to Alabama. The province starts in Rockland County, New York near South Mountain on the west side of the Hudson River.

The eastern border of the Piedmont runs along a fall line, the point at which rivers traditionally drop rapidly from harder metamorphic rocks to softer sedimentary rocks. Because the fall line is the spot where rivers become unnavigable, port cities typically have sprung up where rivers cross this boundary. The east side of the Piedmont runs along the Hudson, parallel to Manhattan, New York City, through New Jersey, and then along a line near Philadelphia, Baltimore, Washington, D.C., Richmond, Virginia, Raleigh, North Carolina, Columbia, South Carolina, Augusta, Georgia, Macon, Georgia, and Montgomery, Alabama. Richmond and Raleigh are both located within the boundaries of the Piedmont. The west side of the Piedmont runs through lesser populated areas, from south of Harrisburg to Lake Martin in Elmore County, Alabama.

There are two sections of the Piedmont. The primary portion is called the Uplands section. There are two unconnected sections of the province, known as the lowlands, in the New York City and Harrisburg, Pennsylvania areas.

The Piedmont is characterized by rolling hills and valleys that are underlain by crystalline metamorphic rocks. The Piedmont is a region of great geological diversity. It is underlain by a variety of rocks that range in age from Precambrian to Cenozoic. The oldest rocks in the Piedmont are gneisses and schists that formed more than a billion years ago during the Grenville orogeny. These rocks were later intruded by granites and other igneous rocks during the Paleozoic era. During the Mesozoic era, the Piedmont was covered by shallow seas that deposited layers of sandstone, shale, and limestone. These sedimentary rocks were later deformed and uplifted during the Cenozoic era.

The Piedmont is also home to several important mineral resources. The region has long been known for its deposits of gold, which were mined extensively during the 19th century. Other important minerals found in the Piedmont include copper, iron, mica, and granite.

== New England province ==
The New England province is a physiographic province of the larger Appalachian Highlands division of the United States. It includes five subdivisions: the New England Uplands, New England Seaboard Lowland, Green Mountain, White Mountain, and Taconic.

- The New England Uplands is the area runs from the northernmost point in Maine to the area south of Reading, Pennsylvania, excluding other notable physiographic features found in the other four sections.
- The White Mountain section starts in the area around Traveler Mountain and rounds west to the Maine/Canadian border. The namesake White Mountains are on the southern border of the section.
- The Green Mountain section is in Vermont from the Canadian border west of Montpelier south to the Hoosac Mountain Range.
- The New England Seaboard Lowland encompasses the "nose" of Maine along the Canada-U.S. border and south, including Augusta, Maine, Portland, Maine, Boston, Massachusetts, to around Charleston Beach, RI. It includes only the northern tip of Cape Cod, Provincetown, Massachusetts. It also excludes the Island of Nantucket and Long Island.
- The Taconic section contains part of the Taconic Mountain range west of the Green Mountains and east of Albany, New York.

Much of the New England province’s bedrock aquifers are in consolidated rocks of sedimentary, igneous, and metamorphic origin. Some of these aquifers, mainly in the western portion of Vermont, consist of carbonate rocks (primarily limestone, dolomite, and marble). These consolidated rocks yield water primarily from bedding planes, fractures, joints, and faults, rather than from intergranular pores.

Like the adjacent physiographic provinces, a large part of the New England province was peneplained during the Jurassic and Cretaceous periods, then uplifted, extensively dissected, and finally glaciated.

== St. Lawrence province (Champlain section) ==
The St. Lawrence Valley is a physiographic province of the larger Appalachian division, containing only the Champlain physiographic section. The St. Lawrence Plain is a vast, flat plain, with elevations rarely exceeding 300m (1,000 feet) in Vermont and New York. This area was originally a forest-wetland complex, although very little of the forest remains today.

The province abuts the eastern edge of the St. Lawrence River in New York along the Canadian border and contains most of Lake Champlain in Vermont and New York. Most of the northern border of the St. Lawrence Valley province is adjacent to a physiographic division in Canada that is not part of the Appalachian Mountains in that country. Canada considers all land of the St. Lawrence Valley to be part of the Central Lowlands. The part of the St. Lawrence Valley province that abuts the Appalachian Uplands of Canada meets the Eastern Quebec Uplands.

== Valley and Ridge province ==
The Valley and Ridge province is a physiographic province of the larger Appalachian division, located in the eastern United States. It is bordered on the east by the Blue Ridge and Piedmont provinces and on the west by the Appalachian Plateau. There are three sections of the province, the Hudson section, the Central section, and the Tennessee section.

- The Hudson section takes in the southern section of Lake Champlain including|South Bay, and follows the man-made Champlain Canal to the point at which the Hudson River turns south toward Albany. It continues along the Hudson to Staatsburg, NY.
- The Central section runs through New York, south of Harrisburg, Pennsylvania, then through Virginia and West Virginia and ends on the border of Burkes Garden in Tazewell County, Virginia.
- The Tennessee section runs through southwest Virginia, covering the Clinch Mountains. It contains Bristol, TN and Knoxville, TN, then turns southward before it gets to Chattanooga, TN which is to the west. It covers Dalton and Rome, GA and Birmingham, AL, ending before it gets to Tuscaloosa, AL.

The province is a series of northeast-southwest trending synclines and anticlines composed of early Paleozoic sedimentary rocks. Limestones and shales are more susceptible to erosion and make up much of the valleys, whereas more resistant sandstones and conglomerates form the ridges.

The Valley and Ridge province extends for nearly 1,200 miles (1,930 km) from the St. Lawrence Valley in upstate New York to the Coastal Plain of central Alabama. Its width varies from 14 to 80 miles (23 to 130 km). The area is home to many valuable resources, both economic and geo-heritage. Vast beds of anthracite coal exist in Pennsylvania and are mined at depths up to 600 m (2,000 ft). Iron and Zinc are also produced in the Valley and Ridge province, mined from the minerals hematite (iron) and sphalerite (zinc).

== See also ==
- List of subranges of the Appalachian Mountains
