= Lens Creek =

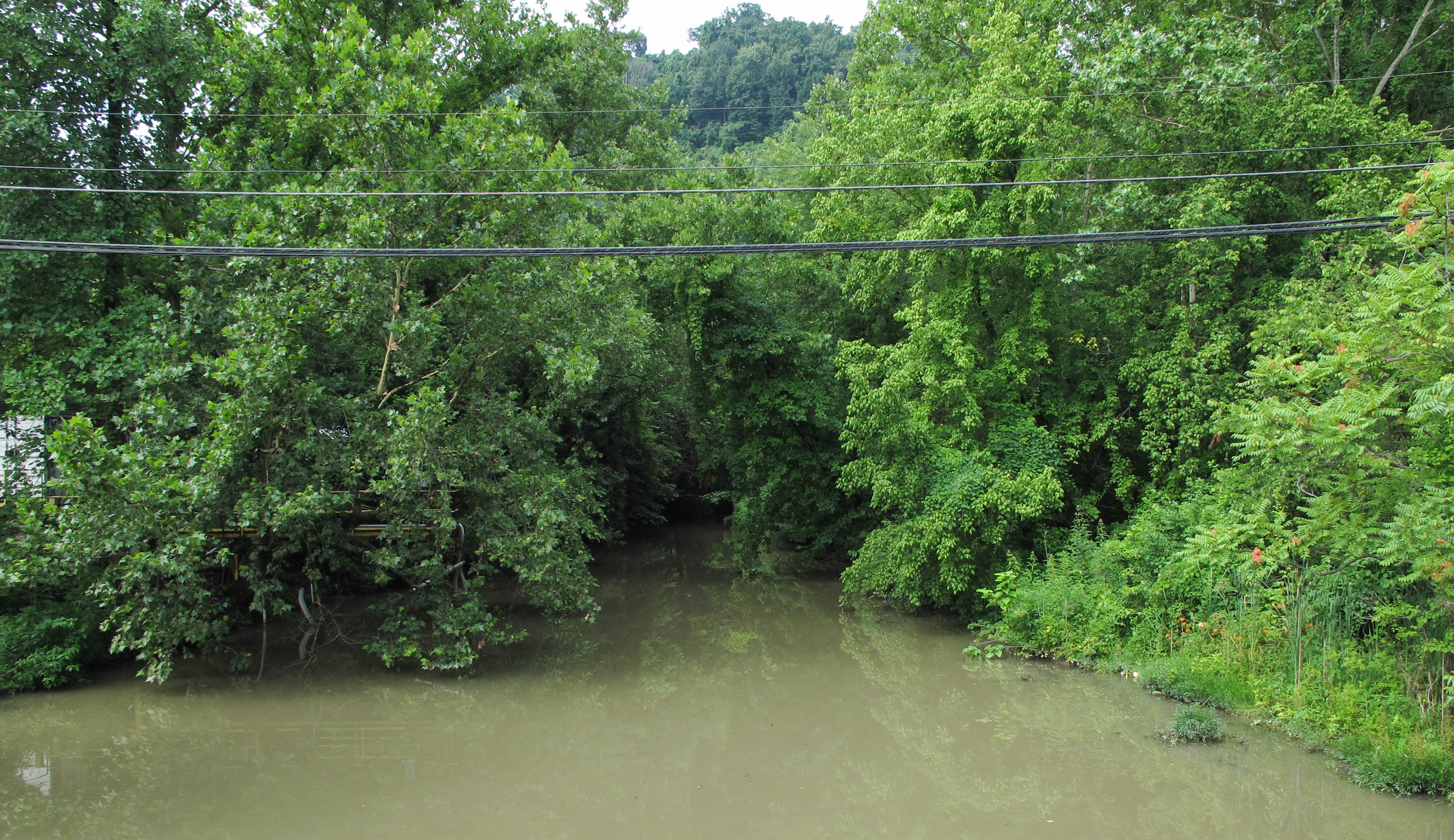
- Lens Creek near its mouth in Marmet

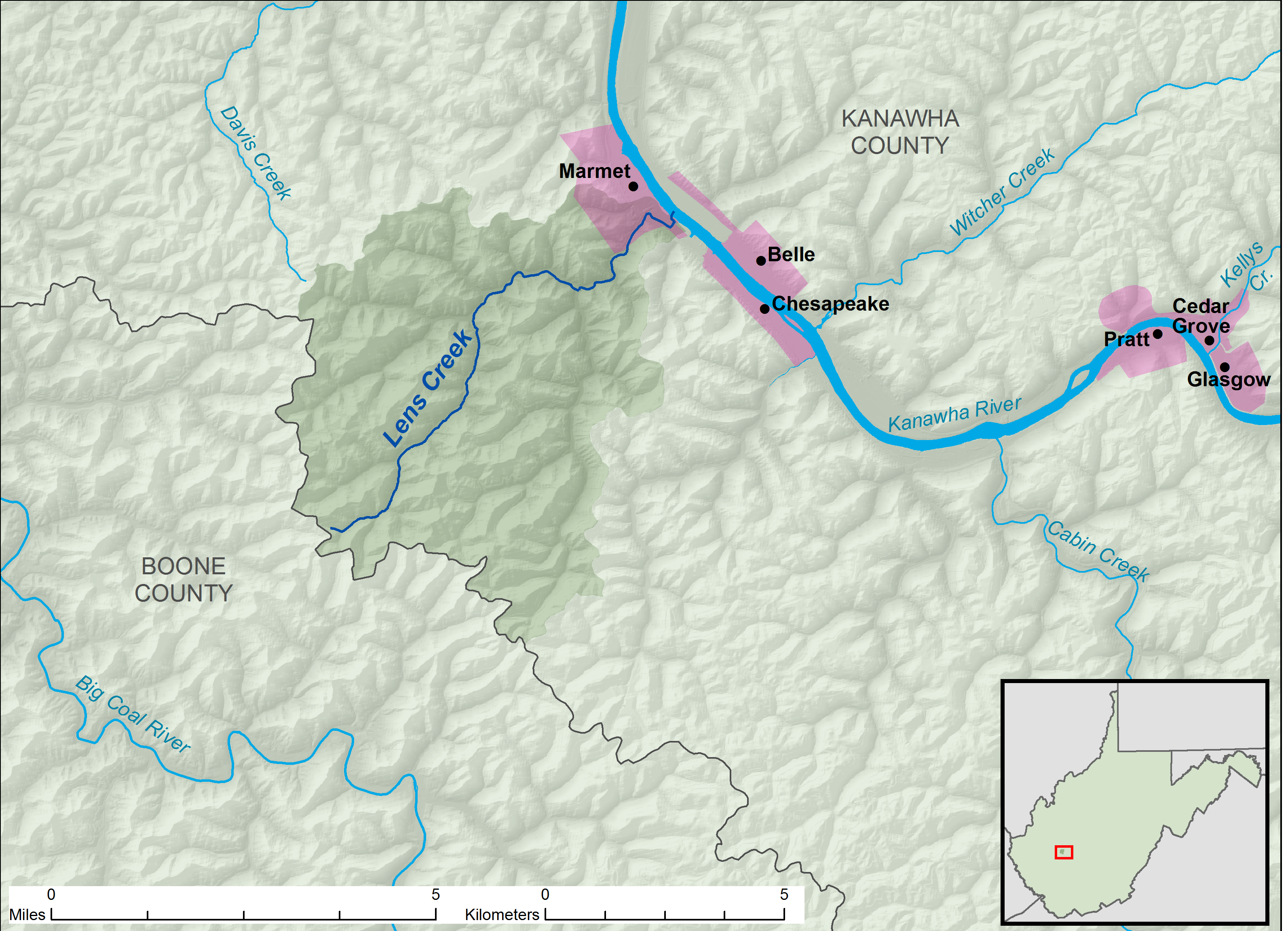
- A map of Lens Creek and its watershed

Location
- Country: United States
- State: West Virginia
- County: Kanawha

Physical characteristics
- Source
  - location: north-northwest of Bloomingrose
  - coordinates: 38.1817678°N 81.6406754°W
  - elevation: 1,278 ft (390 m)
- Mouth: Kanawha River
  - location: Marmet
  - coordinates: 38.2406568°N 81.5584526°W
  - elevation: 591 ft (180 m)
- Length: 6.4 mi (10.3 km)
- Basin size: 19.9 sq mi (52 km^{2})

Basin features
- Hydrologic Unit Code: 050500060402 (USGS)

Lens Creek is a tributary of the Kanawha River, 6.4 miles (10.3 km) long, in West Virginia in the United States. Via the Kanawha and Ohio rivers, it is part of the watershed of the Mississippi River, draining an area of 19.9 square miles (52 km^{2}) on the unglaciated portion of the Allegheny Plateau, in the Charleston metropolitan area.

Lens Creek flows for its entire length in Kanawha County. It rises approximately 2.7 miles (4.3 km) north-northwest of the unincorporated community of Bloomingrose and flows generally northeastward through the unincorporated community of Hernshaw. It flows into the Kanawha River in the city of Marmet. The creek is paralleled for most of its course by West Virginia Route 94.

The creek was named after Leonard "Len" Morris, a pioneer settler.

== See also ==
- List of rivers of West Virginia
