= List of mountain ranges of Quebec =

- Laurentian Mountains - Located in the Canadian Shield, north of the St. Lawrence River and Ottawa River, rising to a highest point of 1166 metres (3,825 ft)
- Appalachians - Physiographic region consisting of thirteen provinces of which a few are in Quebec: the Atlantic Coast Uplands, Eastern Newfoundland Atlantic, Maritime Acadian Highlands, Maritime Plain, Notre Dame and Mégantic Mountains, Western Newfoundland Mountains, Saint Lawrence Valley, New England province
- Chic-Choc Mountains - Located in the central Gaspé Peninsula in Quebec, Canada, rising to a highest point of 1,268 metres (4,160 ft) at Mont Jacques-Cartier
- Monteregian Hills - Linear chain of isolated hills in Montreal and the Montérégie, between the Laurentians and the Appalachians
- Torngat Mountains - Located on the Labrador Peninsula at the northern tip of Newfoundland and Labrador and eastern Quebec (part of the Arctic Cordillera), rising to a highest point of 1,652 m (5,420 ft) at Mount Caubvick (highest point of the province).

== See also ==
- List of mountains of Canada
