= Davis Creek (Kanawha River tributary) =

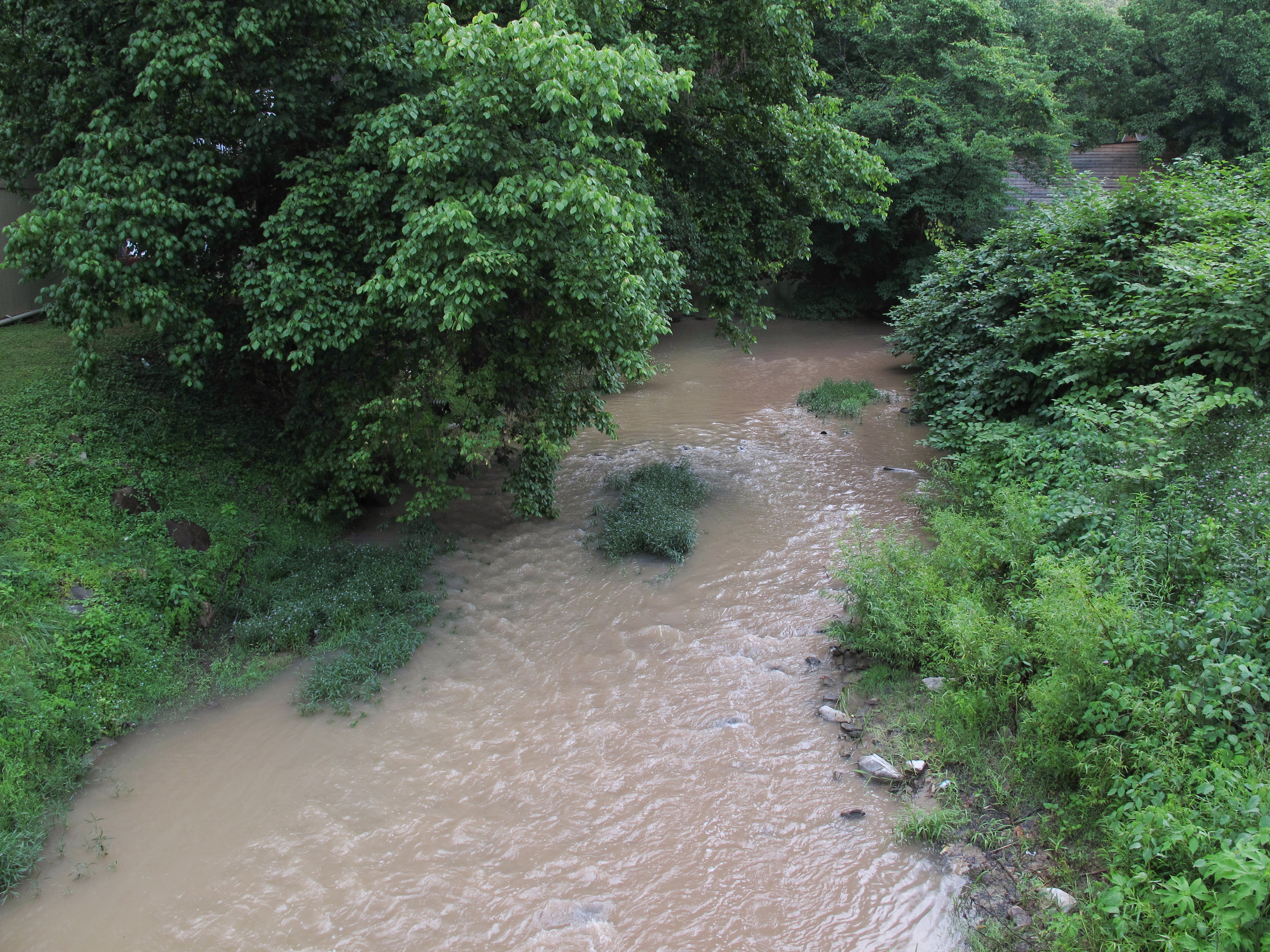
- Davis Creek in the community of Davis Creek

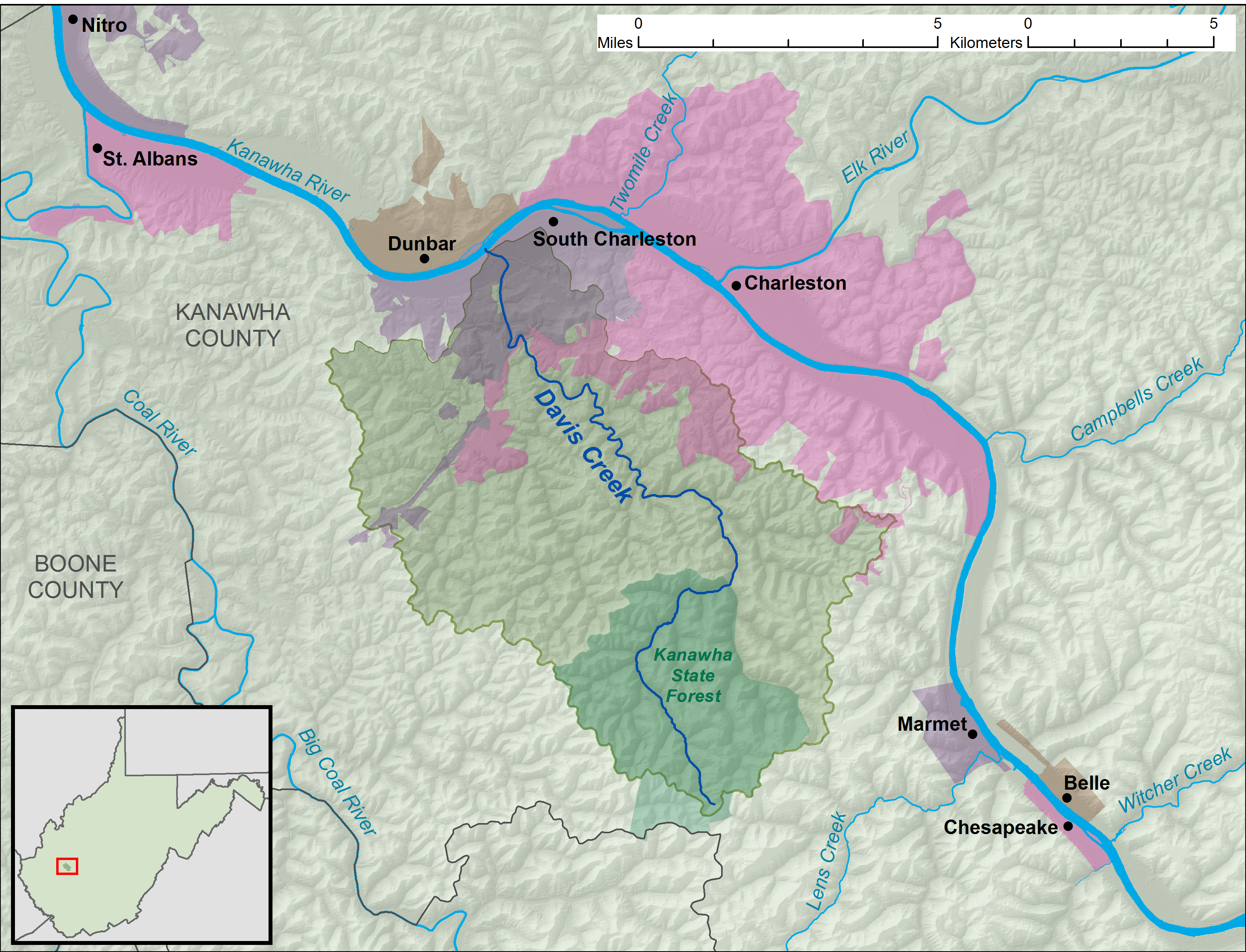
- A map of Davis Creek and its watershed

Location
- Country: United States
- State: West Virginia
- County: Kanawha

Physical characteristics
- Source
  - location: west of Hernshaw
  - coordinates: 38.2281556°N 81.64401°W
  - elevation: 1,254 ft (382 m)
- Mouth: Kanawha River
  - location: South Charleston
  - coordinates: 38.3614845°N 81.7170703°W
  - elevation: 568 ft (173 m)
- Length: 9.4 mi (15.1 km)
- Basin size: 47.1 sq mi (122 km^{2})

Basin features
- Hydrologic Unit Code: 050500080302 (USGS)

Davis Creek is a tributary of the Kanawha River, 9.4 miles (15.1 km) long, in West Virginia in the United States. Via the Kanawha and Ohio rivers, it is part of the watershed of the Mississippi River, draining an area of 47.1 square miles (122 km^{2}) on the unglaciated portion of the Allegheny Plateau, in the Charleston metropolitan area.

Davis Creek flows for its entire length in Kanawha County. It rises in the Kanawha State Forest approximately 2.3 miles (3.7 km) west of the unincorporated community of Hernshaw, and flows generally northwestward through the state forest and the unincorporated communities of Loudendale and Davis Creek, and a small portion of the city of Charleston, to the city of South Charleston, where it flows into the Kanawha River.

The creek is paralleled by county roads for much of its length, and by West Virginia Route 601 for a portion of its course through South Charleston. Hiking trails follow the creek in the Kanawha State Forest.

Davis Creek has the name of Thomas Davis, a pioneer settler.

== See also ==
- List of rivers of West Virginia
