= Kent Creek =

Kent Creek may refer to:

- Kent Creek (Washington)
- Kent Creek (Lake Erie)
- Kent Creek (California)
