= Glaciated Allegheny Plateau =

North American plateau region

Coordinates: 41°N 81°W

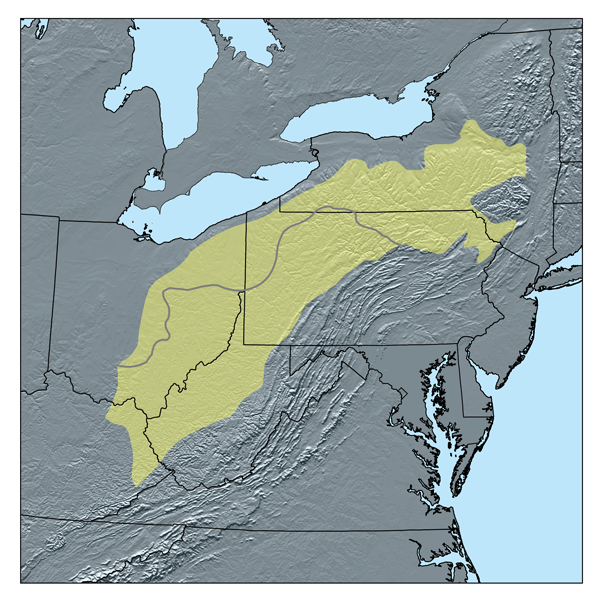
Map of the Allegheny Plateau. The gray line differentiates the glaciated (northern) and unglaciated (southern) sections of the plateau. The unglaciated plateau extends southwestward into eastern Kentucky and Tennessee, where it is called the Cumberland Plateau.

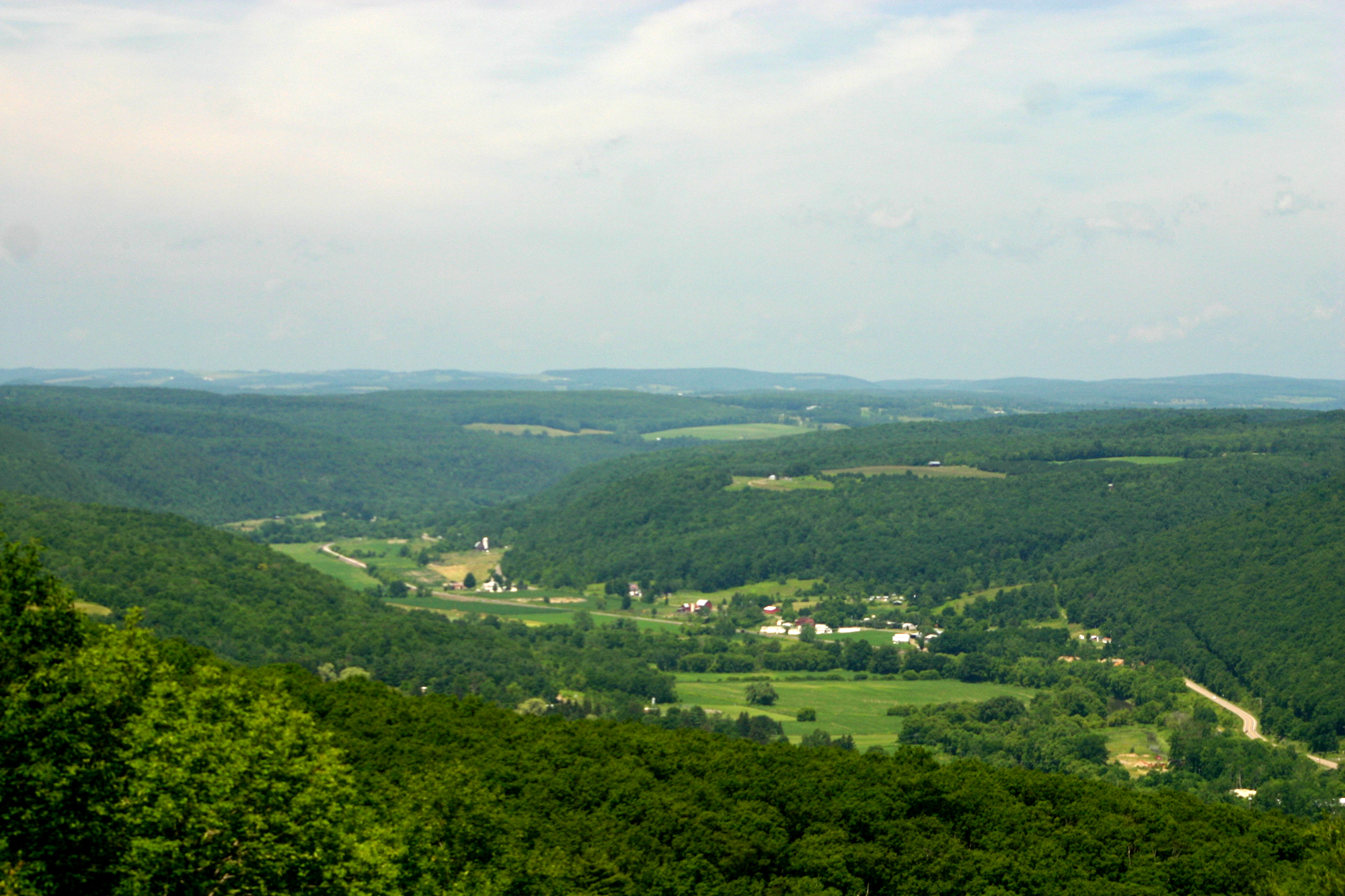
Canisteo River Valley from Pinnacle State Park. Glaciation in this area of the plateau removed the sharp relief that is seen in unglaciated areas of the plateau. The line of the distant peaks approximates the level of a peneplain that was uplifted to form the plateau.

The Glaciated Allegheny Plateau is the portion of the Allegheny Plateau in the Appalachian Mountains that lies within the area covered by the last glaciation. As a result, this area of the plateau has lower relief and gentler slopes than the relatively rugged Unglaciated Allegheny Plateau. It lies to the north and west of the unglaciated plateau, and forms an arc in northeastern to southeastern Ohio lying between the glacial till plains and the Unglaciated Allegheny Plateau. The Glaciated Allegheny Plateau extends into a belt of southern New York State and the central Susquehanna River basin. Major cities on the Glaciated Allegheny Plateau are Akron and Youngstown.

A small area of the Allegheny Plateau was glaciated during the Wisconsin Stage, the late Illinoian Stage, and Pre-Illinoian B and G glaciations of the Pre-Illinoian Stage. This area – only a few hundred square kilometers owing to the blockage the steep relief of the mountains provides at the edge of the ice sheet – contains only old drift now buried by long periods of soil development.
