= Appalachian Uplands =

Physiographic region in Canada

The Appalachian Uplands is one of the seven physiographic regions in Canada, distinguished by its topography and geology. The region includes southern Quebec, Gaspésie, New Brunswick, Nova Scotia, Prince Edward Island and the island of Newfoundland. This is the Canadian portion of the Appalachian Mountains. The United States equivalent portion is called the Appalachian Highlands.

== Physiographic regions, subregions, and divisions ==
The Atlas of Canada uses three levels of physiographic classification. The "region" is the highest level, which is equivalent to the "division" level in the United States. In the Appalachian Uplands, there is no second-level, which in Canada is the "subregion." There are 13 tertiary-level areas (called divisions in Canada) in the Appalachian Uplands region.

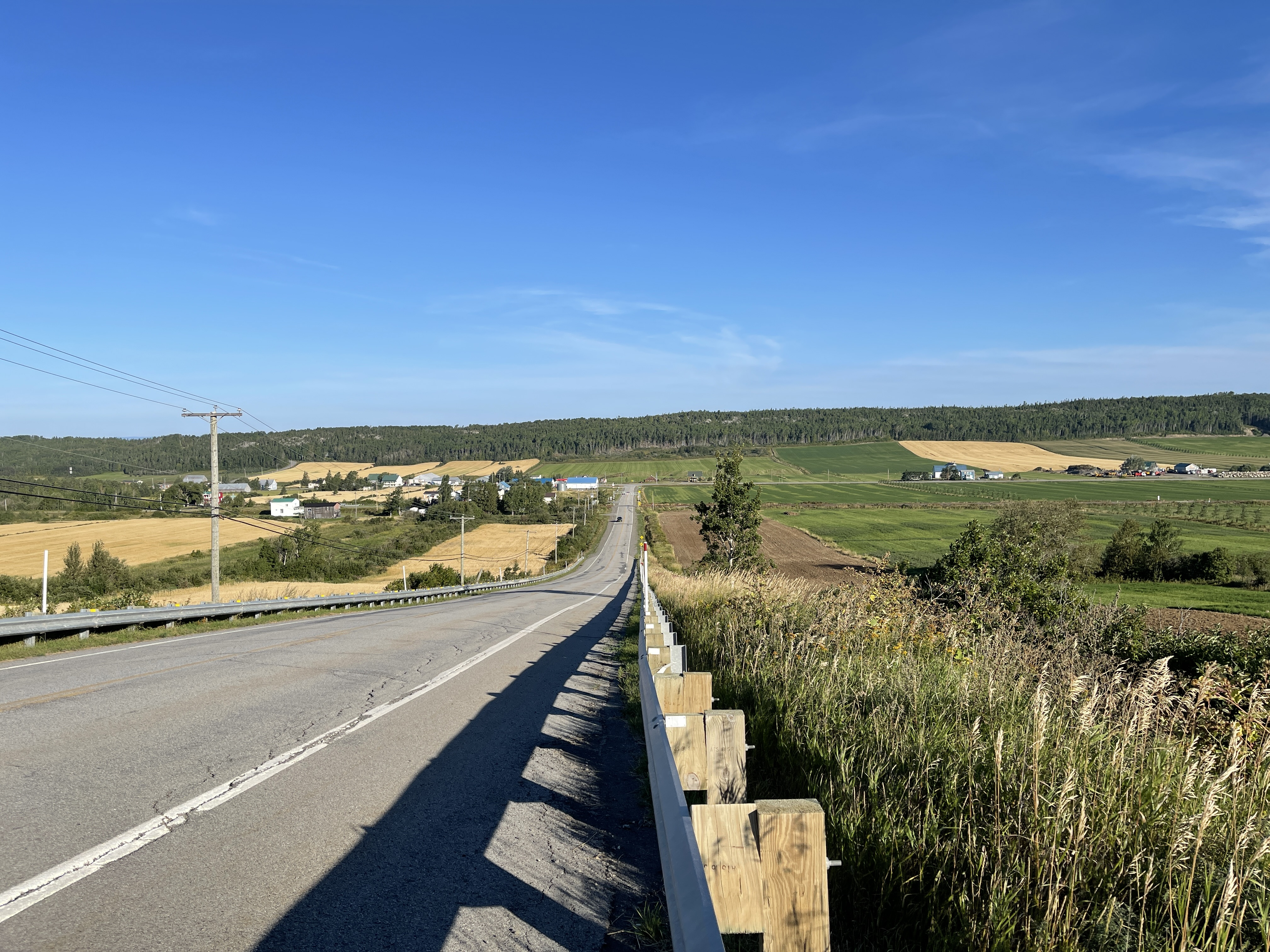
Notre-Dame Range, hills belonging to the Appalachian Mountains, Quebec, Canada

- Newfoundland contains the Newfoundland Highlands, Atlantic Uplands, and Central Lowlands
- Nova Scotia contains the Atlantic Uplands, Nova Scotia Uplands, and the Annapolis Lowlands
- New Brunswick contains the New Brunswick Highlands, the Chaleur Uplands, and the Maritime Plain
- Quebec contains the Notre-Dame Mountains, Eastern Quebec Uplands, Sutton Mountains, and Mégantic Hills

== Distinctive features ==
Features include Gros Morne National Park and the Newfoundland Highlands in Newfoundland, the Cobequid Mountains, Antigonish Highlands, Cape Breton Highlands, Nova Scotia Uplands, and the Annapolis Lowlands in Nova Scotia, the New Brunswick Highlands, Notre-Dame Mountains including the Chic-Chocs Mountains, Sutton Mountains, and Mégantic Hills in Quebec, and the Maritime Plain, "which stretches around the coast of New Brunswick and Nova Scotia from the south shore of Chaleur Bay and includes Prince Edward Island and Îles-de-la-Madeleine."
