= Davis Creek (Lake Erie) =

Davis Creek is a tributary of the Lynn River, which empties into Lake Erie, and Port Rowan. It drains 28.88 square kilometres (11.15 sq mi). Unlike nearby Kent Creek, Davis Creek is poorly covered by forests.
