= Geology of Manhattan Prong =

Geological formation in the northeast United States

Coordinates: 40.838°N 73.936°W

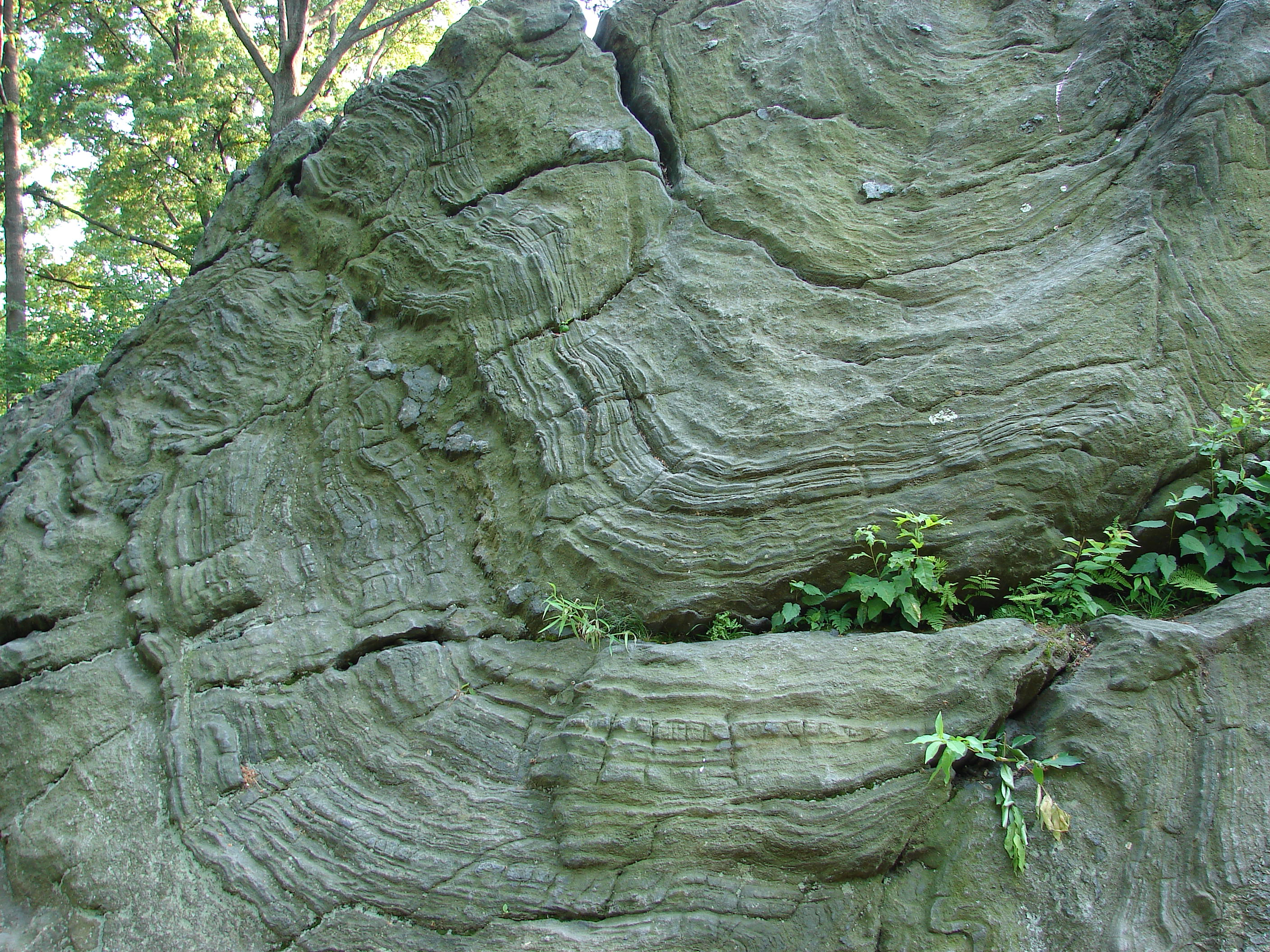
Manhattan schist outcrop in Central Park

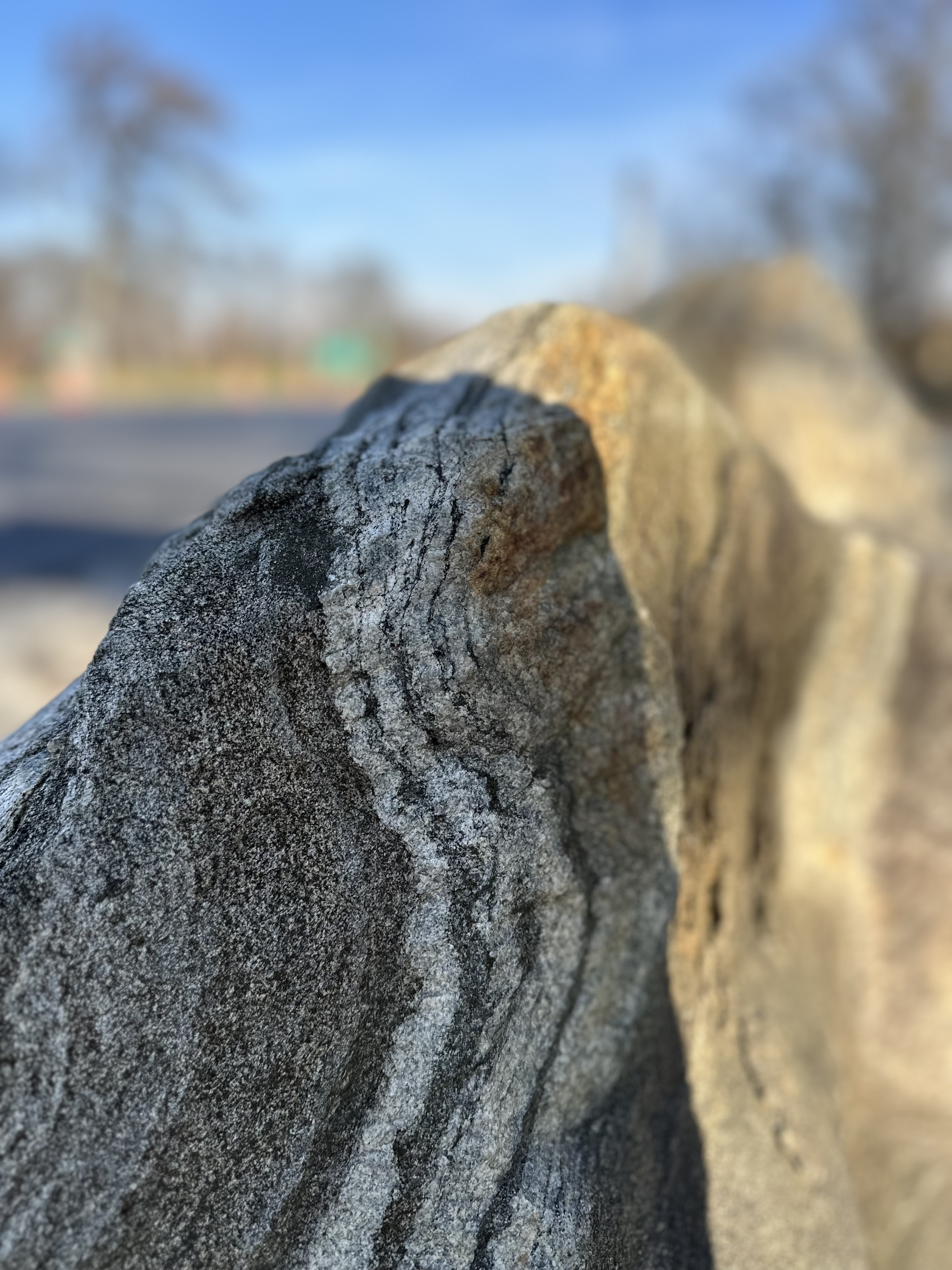
Fordham gneiss outcrop in Pelham Bay Park, Bronx.

In the United States, the Manhattan Prong of the New England Uplands is a smaller belt of ancient rock in southern New York (including Manhattan, the Bronx, and segments of Brooklyn and Staten Island), parts of Westchester County, and upland portions of southwestern Connecticut. The bedrock underlying much of Manhattan consists of three rock formations: Fordham gneiss, Manhattan schist, and Tuckahoe marble (Inwood marble), which are well suited for the foundations of Manhattan's skyscrapers.

The Manhattan Prong and the Reading Prong are separated by the Newark Basin in the south, but the two features merge at the northern terminus of the Newark Basin in the vicinity of Peekskill, New York. A band of mountains that rise nearly one thousand feet along the northwestern margin of the Newark Basin in New York and New Jersey are called the Ramapo Mountains. Another belt of ancient metamorphic and igneous rock crops out along the southern margin of the Newark Basin south and west of Trenton, New Jersey. In this region, the rocks are referred to as part of the Trenton Prong.

== See also ==
- Geology of Manhattan
