= Nittany Arch =

Anticline geologic formation in Pennsylvania, US

The Nittany Arch or Nittany anticline is an anticline geologic formation in the western part of the Ridge-and-Valley physiographic province of the Appalachian Mountains of Central Pennsylvania, United States. The Nitany Arch is more than 100 miles (160 kilometers) long, stretching from Muncy to Hollidaysburg, with a maximum width of approximately 9 miles (15 kilometers).

During the Appalachian orogeny, the sedimentary rock layers in this area folded up, forming the Nittany Arch. The arch was an ancient Himalayan scale mountain that towered above what is now Nittany Valley. It has since eroded leaving its many rock layers exposed with the youngest rock layers at the foot of the Allegheny Front. The more durable rock layers have left the surrounding sandstone ridges above the limestone valleys.

== See also ==
- Bald Eagle Mountain
- Nittany Mountain
