= Davis Creek (Pend Oreille River tributary) =

Stream in Washington, U.S.

Coordinates: 48°18′06″N 117°15′43″W

Davis Creek is a stream in the U.S. state of Washington. It is a tributary of Pend Oreille River.

Davis Creek bears the name of a local early settler.

== See also ==
- List of rivers of Washington
