= Bloomingrose, West Virginia =

Unincorporated community in West Virginia, United States

- Unincorporated community
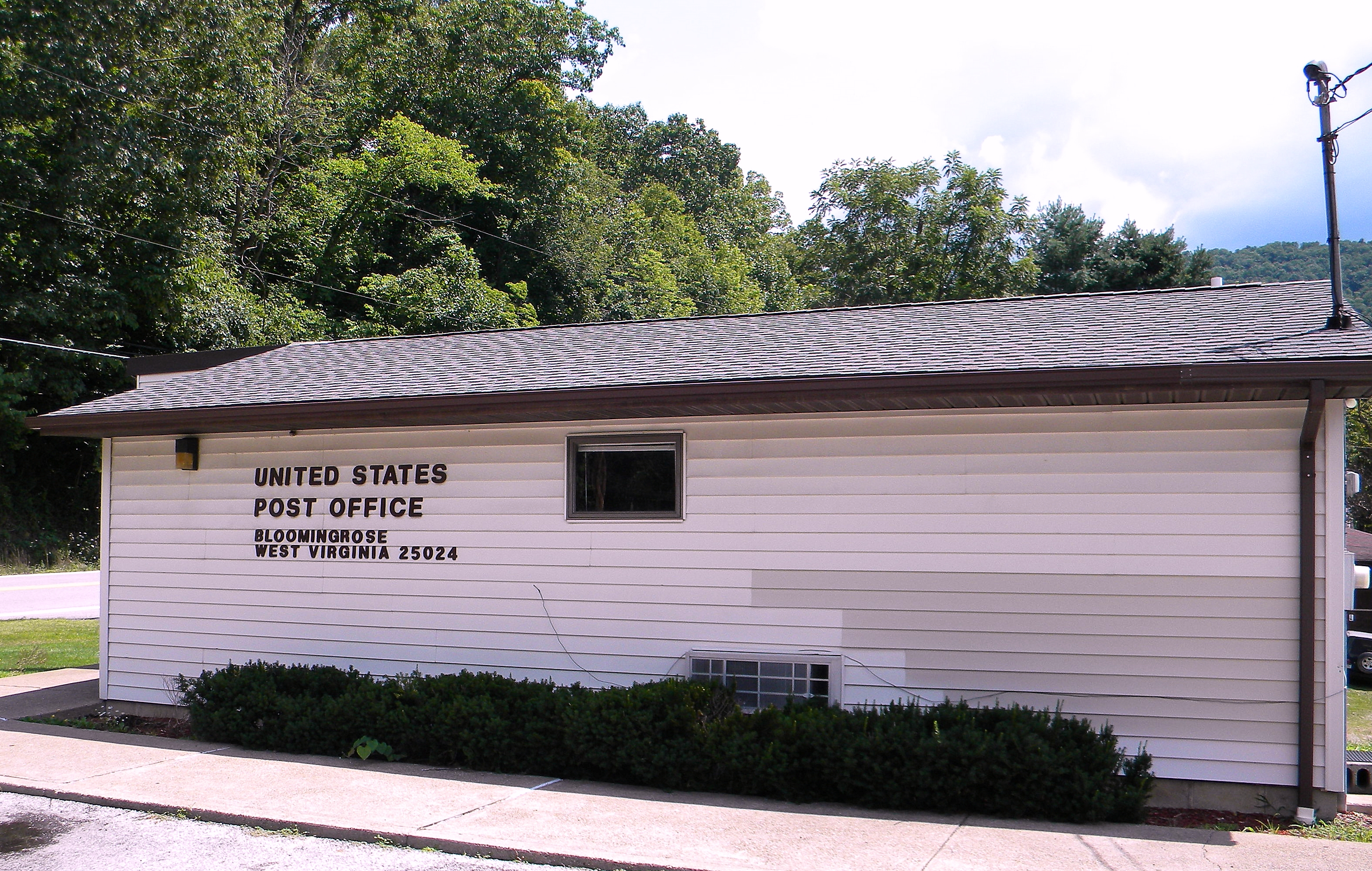
- Post Office at Bloomingrose, West Virginia

- Location within West Virginia Location within the United States
- Coordinates: 38°08′33″N 81°37′59″W
- Country: United States
- State: West Virginia
- County: Boone
- Elevation: 679 ft (207 m)
- Time zone: UTC-5 (Eastern (EST))
  - Summer (DST): UTC-4 (EDT)
- ZIP code: 25024
- Area codes: 304 & 681
- GNIS feature ID: 1536113

Bloomingrose is an unincorporated community in Boone County, West Virginia, United States. Bloomingrose is located on West Virginia Route 3, 11.5 miles (18.5 km) northeast of Madison. Bloomingrose has a post office with ZIP code 25024.

The community was named for the flowers near the original town site.
