= Davis Creek (Guyandotte River tributary) =

Stream in West Virginia, U.S.

Coordinates: 38°23′43″N 82°19′03″W

Davis Creek is a stream in the U.S. state of West Virginia. It is a tributary of the Guyandotte River.

Davis Creek has the name of Paul H. Davis, a local pioneer.

== See also ==
- List of rivers of West Virginia
