= Hernshaw, West Virginia =

- Unincorporated community
- Location within West Virginia Location within the United States
- Coordinates: 38°13′30″N 81°36′08″W
- Country: United States
- State: West Virginia
- County: Kanawha
- Elevation: 666 ft (203 m)
- Time zone: UTC-5 (Eastern (EST))
  - Summer (DST): UTC-4 (EDT)
- ZIP code: 25107
- Area codes: 304 & 681
- GNIS feature ID: 1540175

Hernshaw is an unincorporated community in Kanawha County, West Virginia, United States. Hernshaw is located on West Virginia Route 94, 2.5 miles (4.0 km) southwest of Marmet, along Lens Creek. Hernshaw has a post office with ZIP code 25107.

The community's name is an amalgamation of the names Herndon and Renshaw, two men in the local coal mining industry.

On 2 April 2024, a tornado touched down at the Kanawha State Forest and moved eastward until it dissipated at a point between Hernshaw and Marmet. Significant property damage in and around the unincorporated community occurred as a result.

A 3-vehicle crash on Lens Creek Road (WV Route 94) occurred on 31 January 2025, with one death. On 15 September 2025, a car and a coal truck crashed on Lens Creek Road, with zero injuries. Yet another head-on collision on the same road happened between SUV and a utility truck on 2 December 2025, with one death.
