= New England Seaboard =

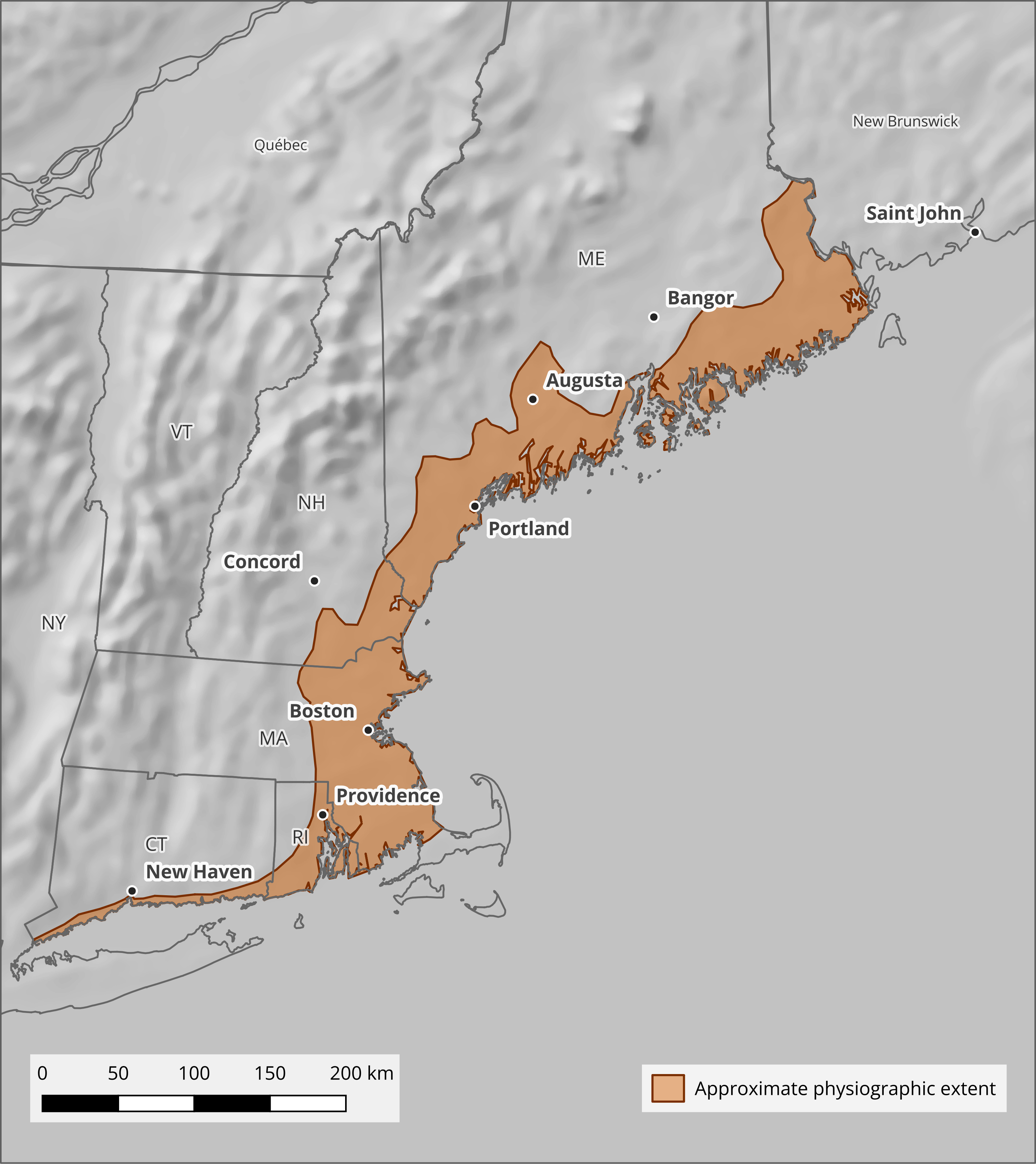
Approximate physiographic extent of the New England Seaboard.

In geology, the New England Seaboard (Lowland) is a physiographic section of the New England province. It includes a thin section of coastal Connecticut, most of Rhode Island, and roughly the coastal counties of Massachusetts, New Hampshire, and Maine. It does not include Long Island, Cape Cod, Martha's Vineyard, Nantucket, the Elizabeth Islands, and smaller islands, which are part of the Outer Lands, a partly submerged extension of the Atlantic coastal plain.

The Seaboard Lowland section is bounded to the northwest by the New England Uplands, and to the southwest by the Atlantic Ocean.
