= Davis Creek (Salt River tributary) =

Stream in the American state of Missouri

Coordinates: 39.1903182°N 91.8762809°W

Davis Creek is a stream in Audrain County in the U.S. state of Missouri. It is a tributary of the Salt River.

Davis Creek has the name of Robert Davis, an early settler.

== See also ==
- List of rivers of Missouri
