= Davis Creek, West Virginia =

Unincorporated community in West Virginia, United States

- Unincorporated community
- Location within West Virginia Location within the United States
- Coordinates: 38°20′14″N 81°42′13″W
- Country: United States
- State: West Virginia
- County: Kanawha
- Elevation: 594 ft (181 m)
- Time zone: UTC-5 (Eastern (EST))
  - Summer (DST): UTC-4 (EDT)
- Area codes: 304 & 681
- GNIS feature ID: 1554264

Davis Creek is an unincorporated community in Kanawha County, West Virginia, United States. Davis Creek is located along a stream with the same name on West Virginia Route 214, 2 miles (3.2 km) south of South Charleston.
