= Appalachian Plateau =

Series of rugged dissected plateaus in the eastern United States

Coordinates: 40°N 78°W

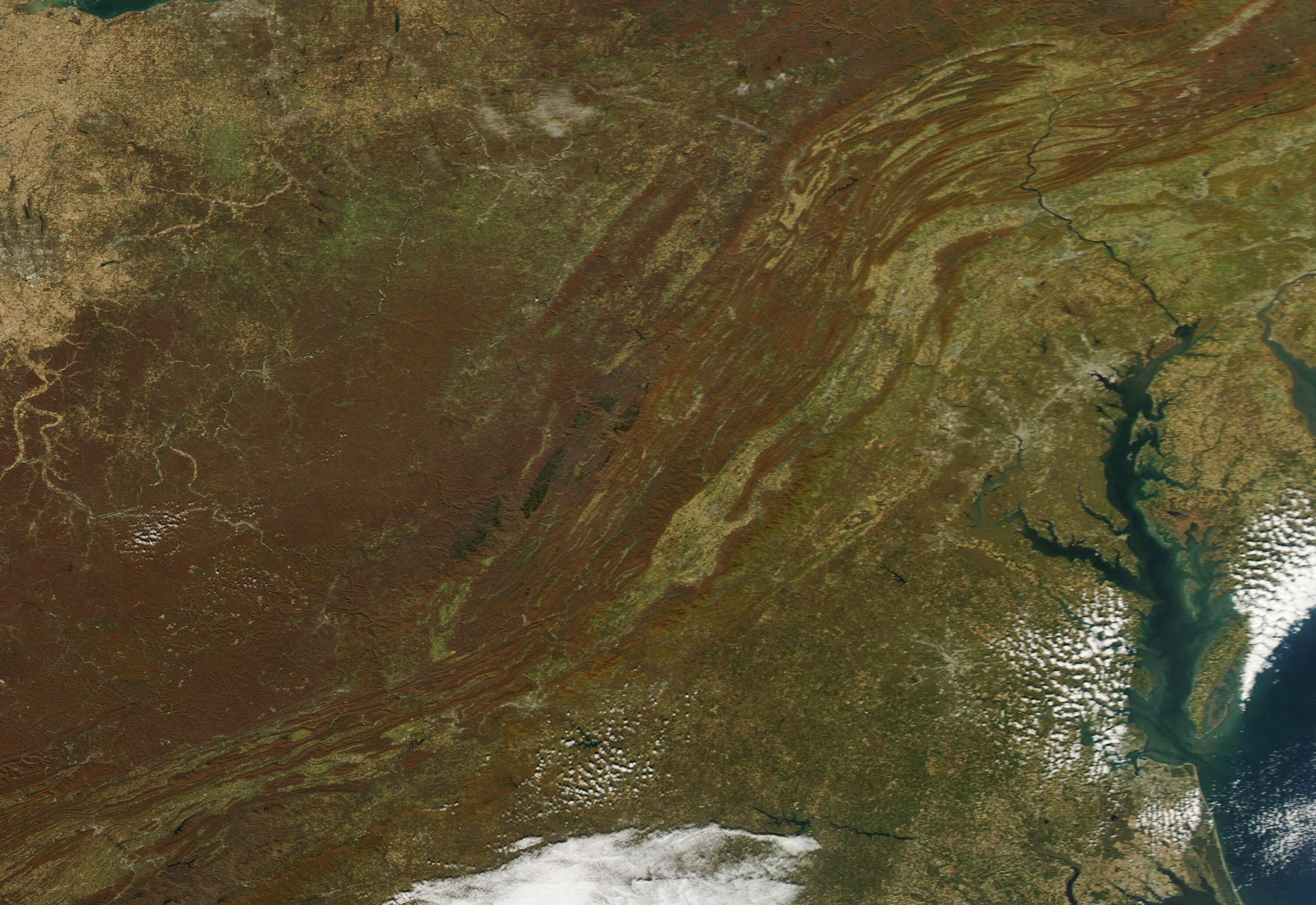
Satellite view of the Appalachian Mountains

The Appalachian Plateau is a series of rugged dissected plateaus located on the western side of the Appalachian Mountains. The Appalachian Mountains are a range that run from Newfoundland in Canada to Alabama in the United States.

The Appalachian Plateau is the northwestern part of the Appalachian Highlands physiographic division of the United States, stretching from New York state to Alabama. The plateau is a second level United States physiographic region, covering parts of the states of New York, Pennsylvania, Ohio, Maryland, West Virginia, Virginia, Kentucky, Tennessee, Alabama, and Georgia.

== Geography and physical features ==
The formation of the plateau began during the Paleozoic Era. Regional uplift during this time caused the area to rise altogether without changing the topography of the land. The eastern side of the plateau appears as a mountain range. This false appearance is due to a very steep slope on the eastern side known as the Allegheny Front. The eastern edge is the highest part of the Appalachian Plateau. In Pennsylvania, the elevation ranges from 1,750 to 3,000 feet and continues to rise toward West Virginia, where the elevation is around 4,800 feet. From West Virginia to Tennessee, the elevation lowers to 3,000 feet and continues slanting downward to 1,000 feet in Alabama. On the western side of the plateau, the elevation is 1500 feet in Ohio, increasing to about 4000 feet in Kentucky. From Kentucky the elevation drops down to 2000 feet in northwestern Alabama. The plateau has a slight slant towards the northwest, making it higher on the eastern side.

A large portion of the plateau is a coalfield, which was formed approximately 320 million years ago during the Pennsylvanian Age. The plateau was subjected to glaciation during the Pleistocene ice age. As a result, the topography of this section of the plateau is relatively flat in comparison to the rest of the physiographic province. This portion of the plateau is marked with evidence of a glaciated past including bogs, lakes, and small hills of sand and gravel. The topography of the rest of the plateau was created mainly from stream erosion. The result is a rugged landscape, unlike many other plateaus, that includes many narrow stream valleys surrounded by steep ridges.

The region in Kentucky is known as the Eastern Kentucky Coalfield. It includes 35 counties and covers around 30% of Kentucky's land. Major sections include the Allegheny Plateau, the Cumberland Plateau and the Cumberland Mountains, with the highest peaks located in the Cumberland Mountains.

=== Physiographic regions ===
A physiographic region is a large portion of land that is grouped by several factors. Each region has similar geology, topography, and groups of plants and animals. There are eight physiographic regions in the United States. Each region is divided into provinces, there are 25 provinces in the United States. Each region is then divided into sections, creating 85 different physiographic sections in the United States. The Appalachian Plateau is a province of the physiographic region of the Appalachian Highlands. The Appalachian Plateau province is divided into seven physiographic sections: Mohawk, Catskill, Southern New York, Allegheny Mountains, Kanawha, Cumberland Plateau, and the Cumberland Mountains. Each section is classified under the Appalachian Plateau province because of its similarities in geologic makeup, topography, and wildlife. Likewise, the Appalachian Plateau falls under the classification of Appalachian Highlands because of those similar characteristics.

== Geology ==
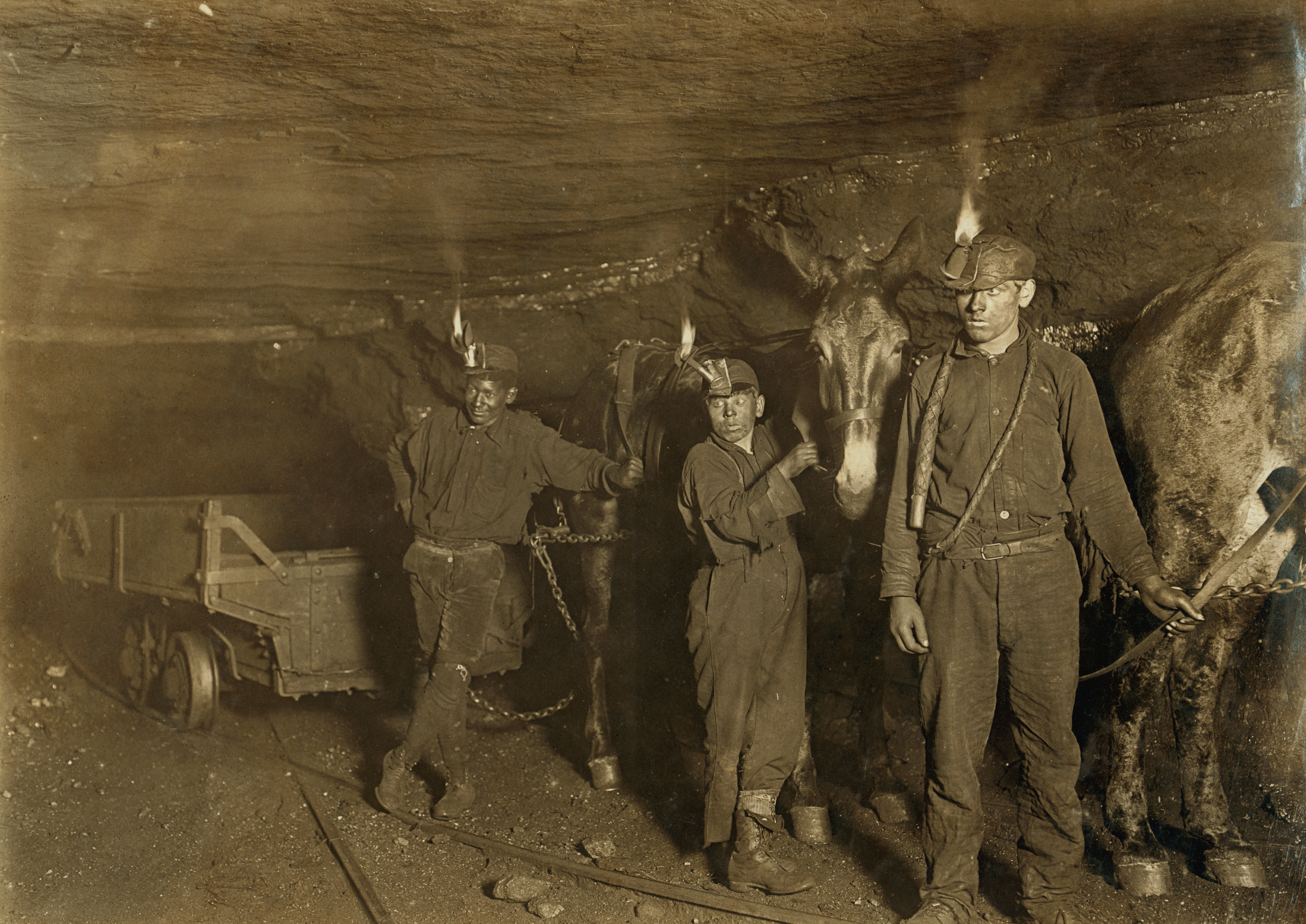
Child coal miners in Gary, West Virginia in 1908

The rock underlying the Appalachian Plateau consists of a base of Precambrian rock, overlain by sedimentary rock from the Paleozoic Era. On top of the basement is a thick layer, approximately 20,000 feet, of a mixture of Cambrian, Ordovician, and Middle Silurian rock. This rock consists of shale, siltstone, and sandstone. Above this layer is the Upper Silurian evaporate basin, or basin of chemically formed sedimentary rocks. The Plateau fold belt consists of structurally complex Paleozoic strata which were thrust faulted over the younger evaporates.

When the Appalachian mountains were formed, the plateau was lifted. Ridges and valleys all die down underneath the plateau. There are multiple valleys throughout the region which consist of exposed areas of limestone and shale.

== History ==
=== Native Americans ===
Archaeologists have evidence that Native Americans in the United States lived in the Appalachian region more than 12,000 years ago; however, it is hard to say exactly when the occupants first inhabited the land. Human artifacts were collected near the Meadowcroft Rockshelter in southern Pennsylvania that were at least 16,000 years old. Because the early Native Americans were hunter-gatherers living off the land, they left little material traces of their lives behind them. This is why it is so hard for researchers to determine when they settled in this area. Much like many historic Native American tribes, the early Appalachian inhabitants survived as nomads, following their food on a seasonal basis.

Around this period, North America was still recuperating from its last glacial period, and the climate was very different from the present. The climate and habitat more closely resembled a tundra, with lower temperatures, numerous conifer trees, and large mammals, such as mammoths and saber-toothed tigers. Eventually, the climate began to warm up again, the large mammals started to disappear, and the vegetation seen more often today began to flourish. These climatic changes made life more sustainable for the Native Americans. They continued to invent new weapons and made advancements in agriculture until the Europeans arrived in North America.

=== European settlement ===
Europeans settled in North America beginning in the seventeenth century. In 1749, Jacob Martin and Steven Sewell were the first Europeans known to settle the Appalachian Plateau, specifically in what is now Pocahontas County, West Virginia. European colonization and competition with the Native Americans resulted in high mortality due to new diseases, as well as more deaths and social disruption due to warfare. After pushing out the Native Americans, the European American settlers developed much of this land for agriculture.

From 1861 to 1865, the Appalachian Plateau suffered from the American Civil War, but in comparison to many other parts of the country, little damage was done. During the war, Union forces gained control over a majority of the plateau, and afterwards that possession was not challenged. Only three noteworthy battles occurred in the plateau region during the war, so not much of the land was destroyed.

After the war, the coal industry boomed. Many counties in the Appalachian Plateau region, such as McDowell County, West Virginia, became dominated by coal mining. Coal mining towns were created, and many immigrants were attracted to the region for work. Although mining was good for the economy, deaths were high in the harsh work of the mines. Among the terrible coal incidents was the Monongah mining disaster of 1907.

== Protected lands ==
Protecting the Appalachian Region from damage of human influence has been important in the modern era. Conservationists have been fighting to preserve the wildlife in the Appalachia region. The region has proved that with good care, the flora and fauna can be very resilient. However, back in 1890, the destruction of the Appalachian region's forest was at full-scale with the invention of the railroad, saw-mills, and clear-cutting of trees. This caused major flooding and wildfires to the region and destroyed keystone species across the region. Realizing that the destruction of the forest was becoming a major issue, the government passed the Weeks Act of 1911, which allowed the federal government to purchase private land in order to protect rivers and watersheds in the eastern United States.

The first purchase under this act was the Pisgah National Forest. In 1964, the Wilderness Act expanded protections for millions of acres of federal land, such as the Shining Rock and Linville Gorge. The 1975 Eastern Wilderness Act created expanded protected areas in North Carolina, Virginia, and Tennessee. Today, close to 21% of the region is protected. Conservation groups that are dedicated to preserving the Appalachian Plateau region include the Southern Appalachian Forest Coalition and the Northern Forest Alliance. Ultimately, experts and researchers say the best way to continue protecting the Appalachian region is to incorporate conservation into public education so that people understand and support the benefits of conserving the lands.

== Wildlife ==
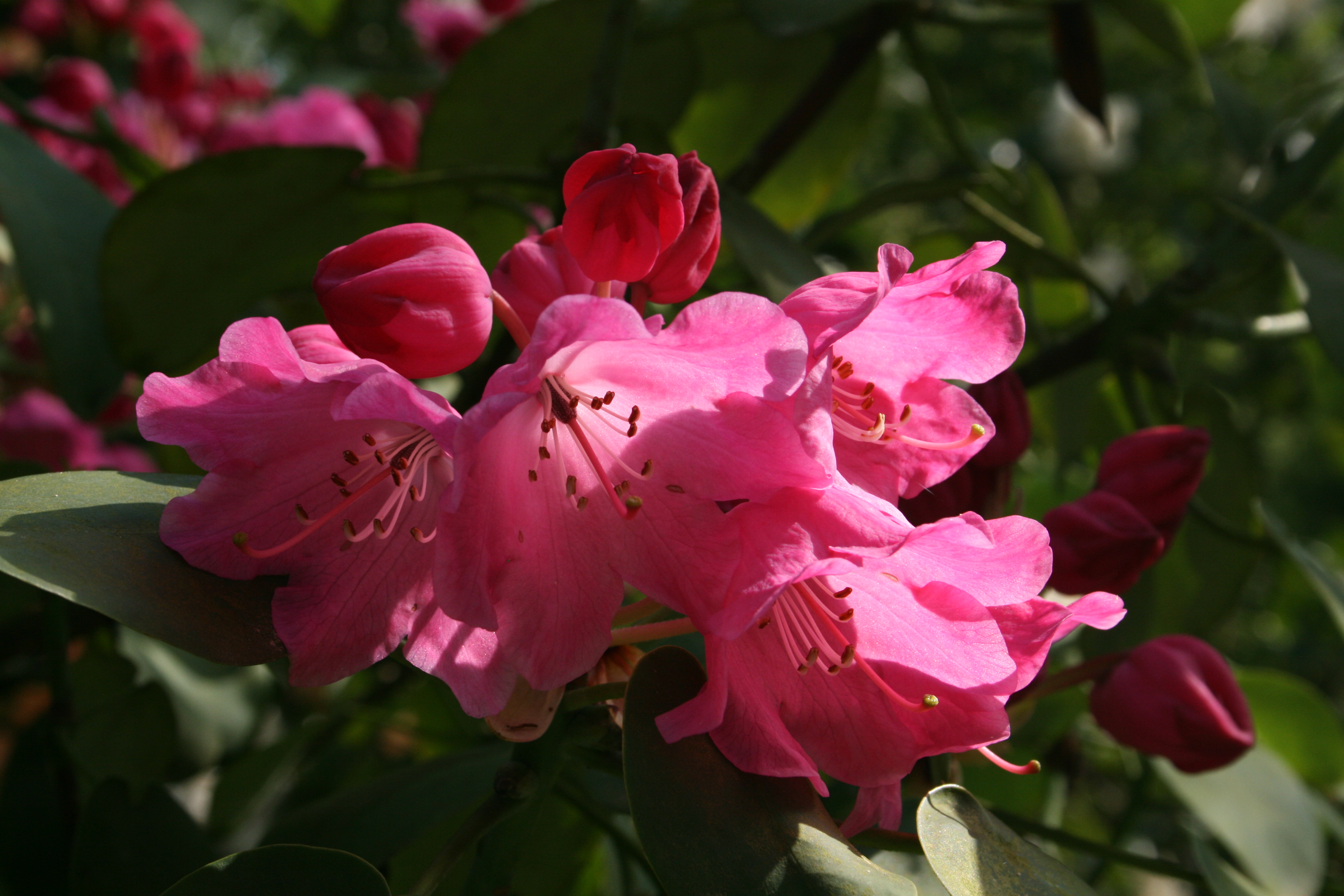
Rhododendron, a plant family common to the Appalachian Plateau

=== Plants ===
The Appalachian region is home to a wide variety of plant and animal life due to its vast array of climate and conditions giving the Appalachian Plateau region great biodiversity. To the north are many conifers, such as red spruce and balsam fir which can be seen growing at the northernmost latitudes of the Appalachian region. In the northern sections of the plateau at lower elevations you can find northern hardwoods, such as sugar maple and white oak. In southern Appalachia, growth of sycamore, walnut, and hickory trees are common. It is estimated that there is around 2,000 species of flora within the Appalachia region. Flowers vary due to elevation and climate of the area of Appalachia region. Different types of flowers in the northern and southern sections of the Appalachia. Flowers such as rhododendron, azalea and mountain laurel can be found in southern regions while up north trees will bear serviceberry, redbud, sourwood, and many others.

=== Animals ===
Fauna such as bison and eastern wolves used to be native to the Appalachian region but have vanished. Elk have been reintroduced in some regions, having died out due to overhunting and habitat destruction previously. Throughout all of the Appalachian Plateau region there is an abundance of fox, raccoon, wild boar, black bears, white-tailed deer, and beaver. Researchers also found there to be over 200 species of game and songbirds including wild turkey, heron, geese, hawks, ducks and many more.

Fungi are also prominent in the Appalachia region. Abundant mushroom and lichen can be found including chanterelle, oyster mushroom and rock tripe.

== Natural resources ==
The Appalachian Plateau has a vast array of natural resources throughout its rugged landscape. Within these resources, there are many sedimentary substances. In the valleys of the Appalachian Plateau there is an abundance of limestone. This limestone is still mined for cement and aggregate. Due to excessive mining over time, limestone fields are depleted in many areas but some are still relatively plentiful. Ironstone and coal are also among the plentiful natural resources found. In different regions of the Appalachian Plateau, enough plant debris accumulated to form peat, which upon burial, compaction and heating was made into the coal of the Appalachian coalfields. Due to the abundant coal in the Appalachian Plateau, coal mining has been a staple of the area and has proved to be a very successful mining hub. Iron ore was once an extremely abundant natural resource but due to the thin layer of iron, over time it was mostly depleted. A very well-known natural resource of the Appalachian Plateau is its land and soil. The soil is rich and it is ideal for farmland. Within the limestone found throughout the Appalachian Plateau there are many fossilized substances such as old plant and stems, which may help to explain why the plateau also has a rich amount of natural gases and petroleum.

== Landmarks and state parks ==
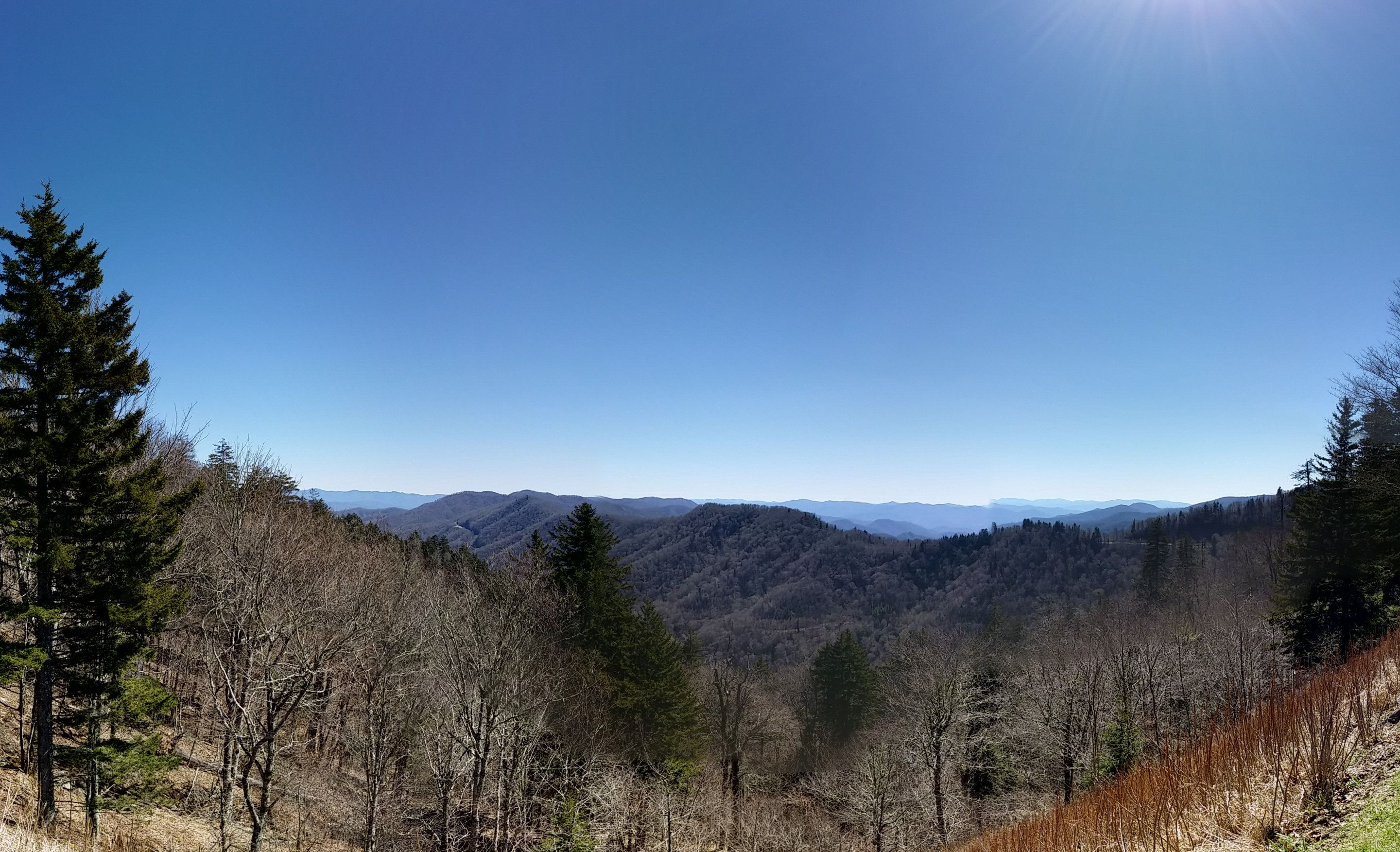
The Great Smoky Mountains in Tennessee

The Appalachian Plateau has many landmarks and public spaces to camp out, go hiking, and sight see. Allegany State Park in New York, Ohiopyle State Park in Pennsylvania, Hocking Hills State Park in Ohio, Cooper's Rock State Forest in West Virginia, and Cloudland Canyon State Park in Georgia are notable state parks on or along the edge of the plateau; there are many more state parks and state forests throughout the region, and Wayne National Forest and Allegheny National Forest lie on the Appalachian plateau as well.

== See also ==
- Geology of the Appalachians
