= Kent Creek (Washington) =

- Location of the mouth of Kent Creek in Washington Kent Creek (Washington) (the United States)

Location
- Country: United States
- State: Washington
- County: Pend Oreille

Physical characteristics
- Source
  - coordinates: 48°11′57″N 117°13′26″W
- Mouth
  - coordinates: 48°13′58″N 117°12′34″W
  - elevation: 2,044 feet (623 m)

Kent Creek is a stream in the U.S. state of Washington. The creek was named after Fred Kent, a local land owner. Its main source is Mountain Meadows Lake (a.k.a. Kent Meadows Lake) in the Pend Oreille/Deer Creek watershed, however the earthen dam at the lake's outlet means that it only discharges water into Kent Creek when inflows are sufficient to reach an overflow pipe, which mainly occurs during March and April. Under normal circumstances, the creek is fed by small tributaries and springs.

== Fauna ==
Kent Creek has had eastern brook trout, and was identified in 2003 as a recoverable habitat for bull trout. In 1999, a group of eight active nests at the creek's mouth was identified as one of two double-crested cormorant colonies in the Pend Oreille watershed.

== See also ==
- List of rivers of Washington (state)
