= South Mountain (New York) =

Mountain in New York State, USA

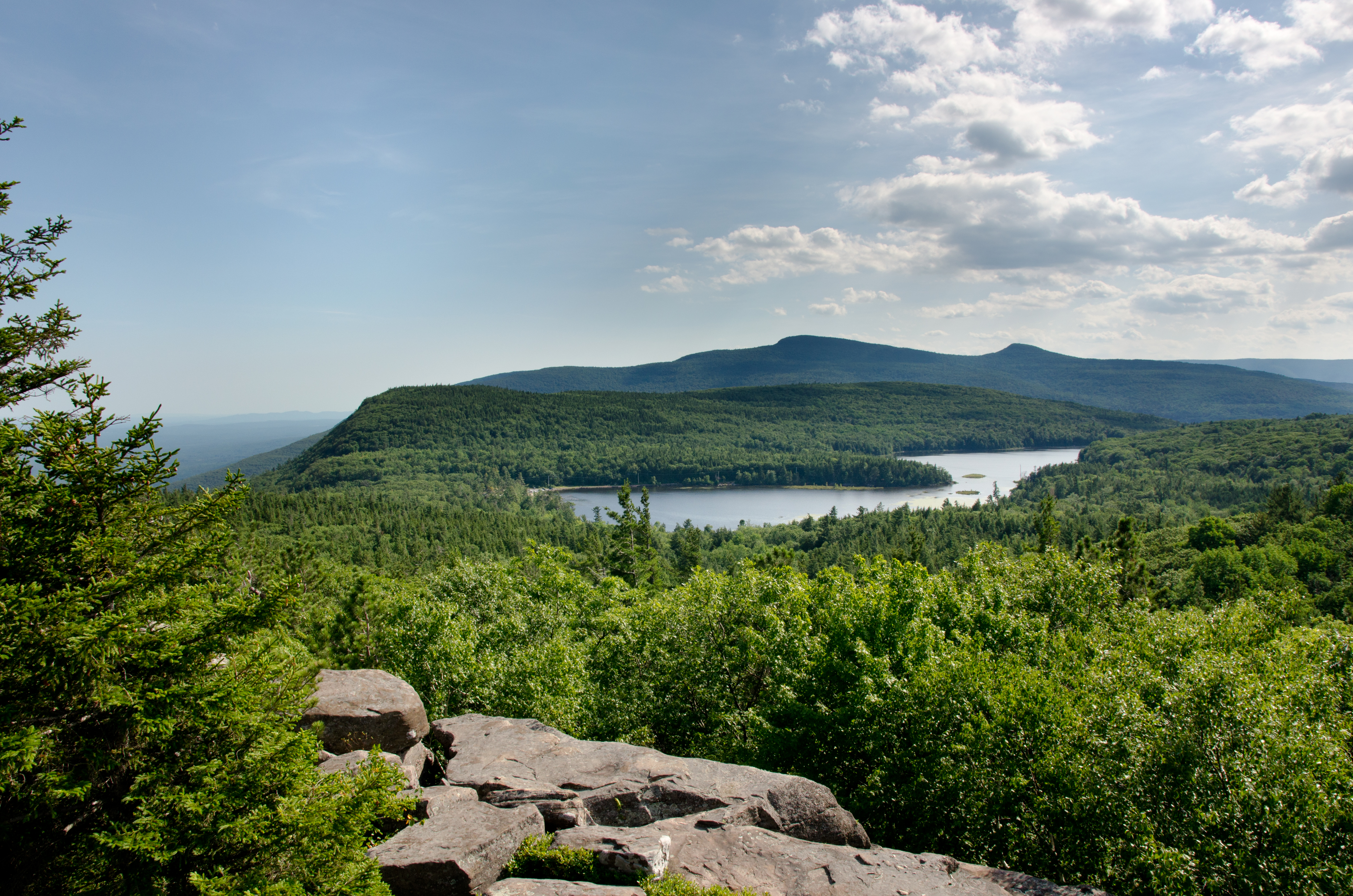
- North-South Lake with South Mountain behind it, in the far back on the right is Roundtop Mountain and the left is High Peak.

Highest point
- Elevation: 2,467 ft (752 m)
- Coordinates: 42°11′21″N 74°03′06″W

Geography
- Location within New York Location within the United States
- Location: E of Haines Falls, New York, U.S.
- Topo map: USGS Kaaterskill Clove

South Mountain is a mountain located in Greene County, New York east of Haines Falls, New York. Located to the southwest is Roundtop Mountain. High Peak drains south into Kaaterskill Creek and north into North-South Lake.
