= Trenton Prong =

Subprovince in the Appalachian Mountains

The Trenton Prong is a physiographic subprovince of the Piedmont Uplands section of the Piedmont province of the Appalachian Mountains. The prong consists of crystalline metamorphic rock.

== Location ==
The Trenton Prong stretches from near Norristown, Pennsylvania, through northern Philadelphia and southern Bucks County, reaching its northern terminus in West Windsor Township, New Jersey. The prong underlies much of the City of Trenton, and forms a series of rapids known as the Falls of the Delaware River.

== Geology ==
The Trenton Prong is part of the Precambrian basement which is discontinuously exposed in the north-central Appalachians. The rocks that make up the prong are mostly Ediacaran and Cambrian aged rocks, that includes the Wissahickon Formation. Other rocks present include metabasalt, gabbro, gneiss, migmatite and granofels. The prong is heavily eroded, presenting as low, gently rolling hills.
