= Atlantic Upland =

Coordinates: 44°35′16.5″N 65°16′53.1″W

The Atlantic Upland, which is cut by lowlands, stretches over most of southern Nova Scotia, Canada. The surface of the Atlantic Upland rises from sea level on the Atlantic shore to about 180 to 200 metres (about 600 to 700 feet) at the southern side of the Annapolis Valley.

Most of the rivers on the mainland part of the province radiate outward in the Atlantic Upland. The rivers are generally short and narrow. Examples of these rivers include the LaHave, Shubenacadie, and Mersey.
