= Allegheny Plateau =

Dissected plateau in the eastern United States

Coordinates: 41°N 80°W

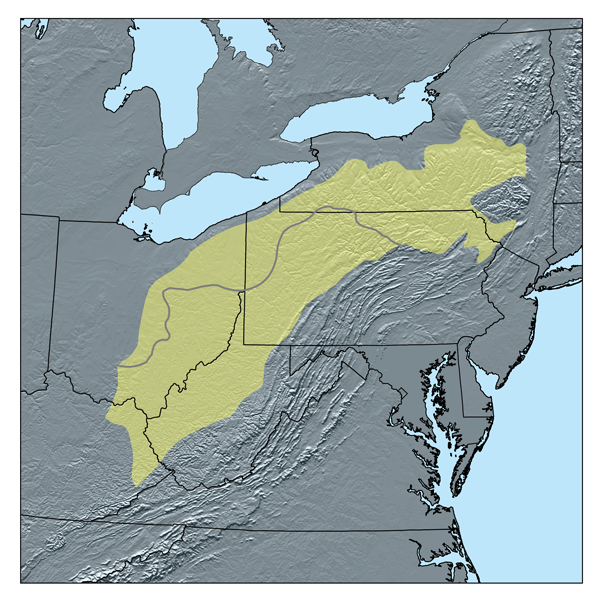
Map of the Allegheny Plateau with the gray line differentiating the glaciated (northern) and unglaciated (southern) sections of the plateau

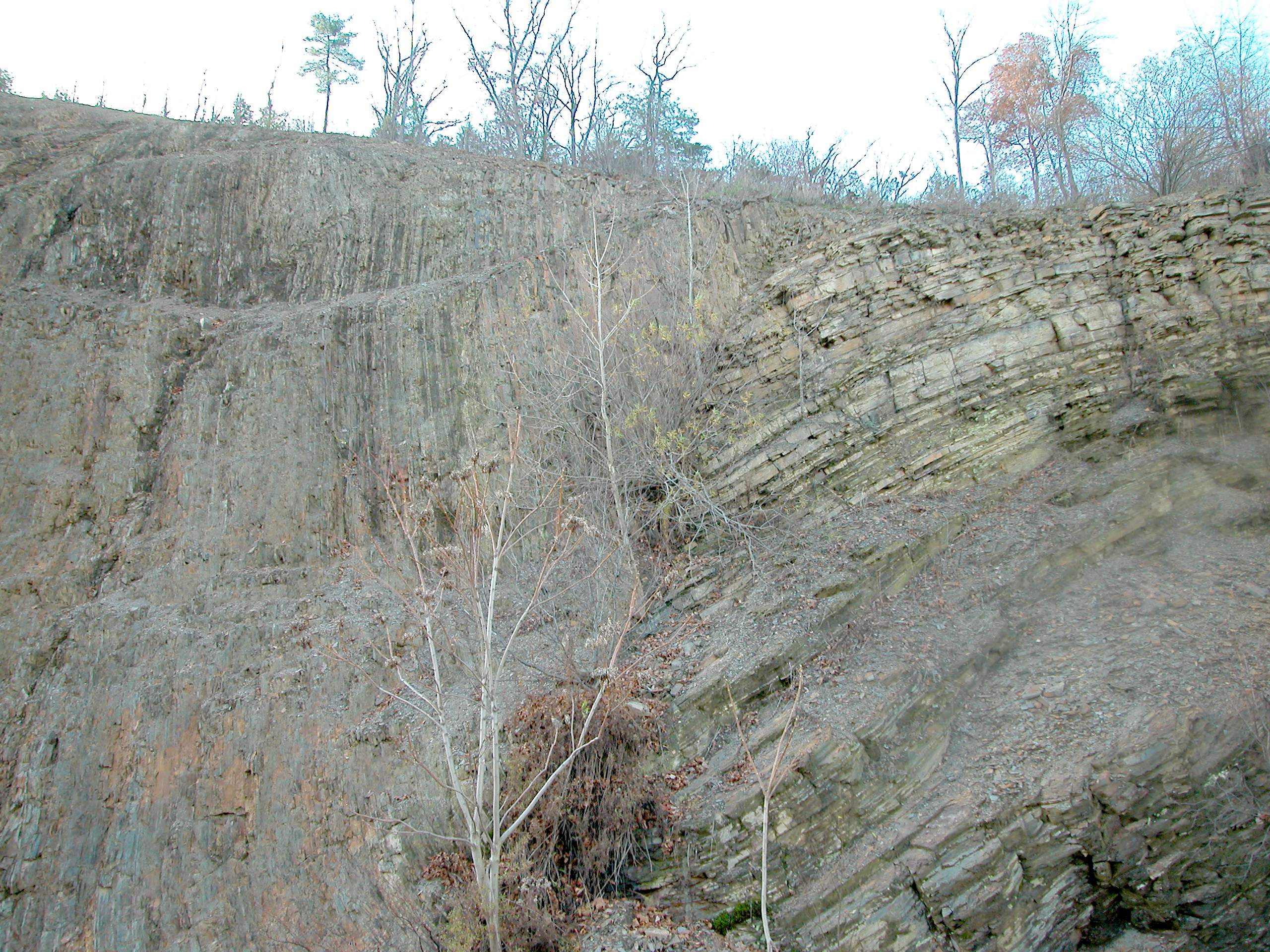
Major fault at the dividing line between the Allegheny Plateau and the Appalachian Mountains along U.S. Route 15 near Williamsport, Pennsylvania

The Allegheny Plateau (/ˌælɪˈɡeɪni/ AL-ig-AY-nee) is a large dissected plateau area of the Appalachian Mountains in western and central New York, northern and western Pennsylvania, northern and western West Virginia, and eastern Ohio. It is divided into the unglaciated Allegheny Plateau and the glaciated Allegheny Plateau.

The plateau extends southward into western West Virginia, eastern Kentucky, and Tennessee, where it is instead called the Cumberland Plateau.

The plateau terminates in the east at the Allegheny Mountains, which are the highest ridges just west of the Allegheny Front. The Front extends from central Pennsylvania through Maryland and into eastern West Virginia.

The plateau is bordered on the west by glacial till plains in the north, generally north of the Ohio River, and the Bluegrass Region south of the Ohio River.

Elevations vary greatly. In the glaciated Allegheny Plateau, relief may only reach one hundred feet or less. In the unglaciated Allegheny Plateau in southeastern Ohio and westernmost West Virginia, relief is typically in the range of two hundred to four hundred feet. Absolute highest elevations in this area are often in the range of 900 to 1,500 feet (270 to 460 m). By the Allegheny Front, however, elevations may reach well over 4,000 feet (1,200 m), with relief of up to 2,000 feet (610 m).

== Geology and physiography ==
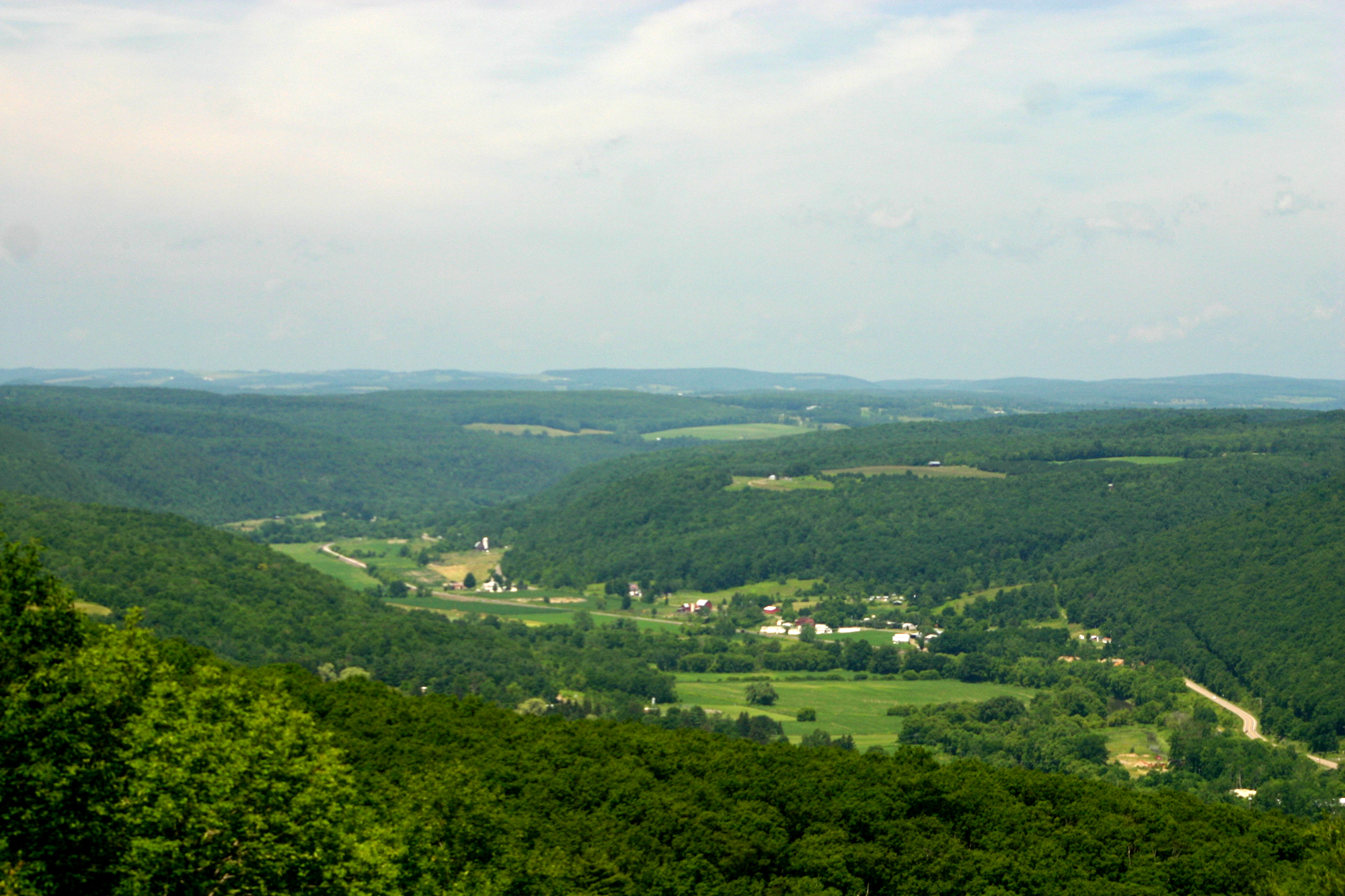
Canisteo River Valley from Pinnacle State Park in Steuben County, New York. Glaciation in this area of the plateau removed the sharp relief that is seen in the plateau's unglaciated areas. The line of the distant peaks approximates the level of a peneplain that was uplifted to form the plateau.

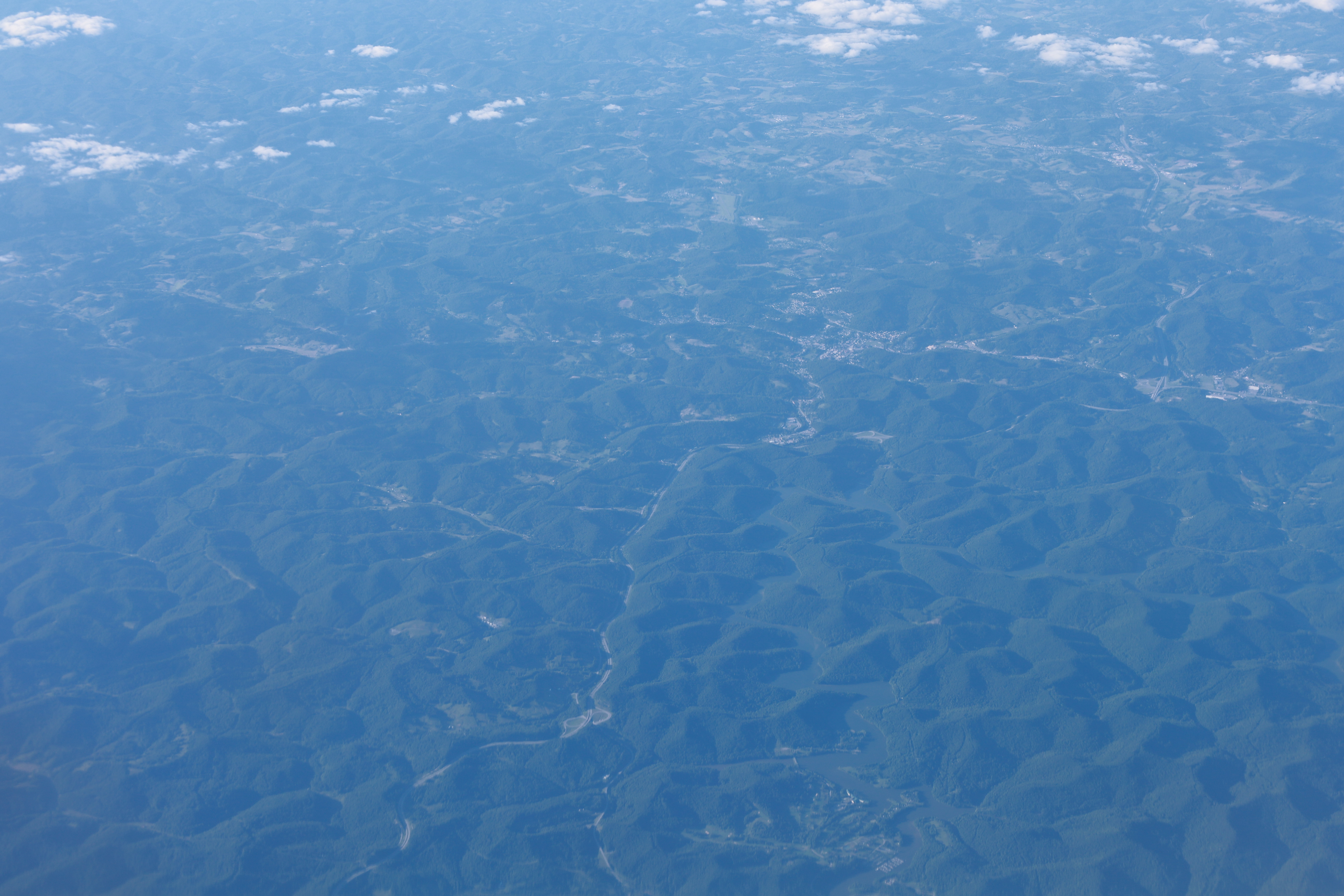
Aerial view of Allegheny Plateau terrain surrounding Weston, West Virginia

The Allegheny Plateau is a physiographic section of the larger Appalachian Plateau province, which in turn is part of the larger Appalachian physiographic division.

== See also ==
- Allegheny Front, the transition escarpment from the Allegheny Plateau to the Ridge-and-Valley Appalachians
- List of subranges of the Appalachian Mountains
- Ridge-and-Valley Appalachians

== Bibliography ==
- Faill, Rodger T. (June 1997). "A Geologic History of the North-Central Appalachians, Part 1: Orogenesis from the Mesoproterozoic through the Taconic Orogeny". American Journal of Science. 297 (6): 551–619. Bibcode:1997AmJS..297..551F. doi:10.2475/ajs.297.6.551.
- Faill, Rodger T. (September 1997). "A Geologic History of the North-Central Appalachians, Part 2: The Appalachian Basin from the Silurian through the Carboniferous". American Journal of Science. 297 (7): 729–761. Bibcode:1997AmJS..297..729F. doi:10.2475/ajs.297.7.729.
- Faill, Rodger T. (February 1998). "A Geologic History of the North-Central Appalachians, Part 3: The Alleghany Orogeny". American Journal of Science. 298 (2): 131–179. Bibcode:1998AmJS..298..131F. doi:10.2475/ajs.298.2.131.
