= Notre Dame and Mégantic Mountains =

Physiographic province of the larger Appalachian division

The Notre Dame and Mégantic Mountains in Canada are a physiographic province of the larger Appalachian division, and also contain the Chic-Choc Mountains. The Notre Dame Mountains rise to a level of approximately 610 m (2000 ft) above sea level and extend southwest to northeast, south of the Saint Lawrence River. The abundant mineral resources in this region have resulted in a unique mining landscape. The Notre Dame Mountains extend 800 km (500 mi) from the Green Mountains of Vermont into the Gaspé Peninsula, Quebec.
