= Kent Creek (Lake Erie) =

River in Ontario, Canada

Kent Creek is a tributary of the Lynn River, one of the watersheds administered by the Long Point Region Conservation Authority. It is considered a cold-water stream, and hosts a population of Brook Trout. It drains 38.24 square kilometres (14.76 sq mi).
