= Maritime Plain =

Physiographic province of the larger Appalachian division

Coordinates: 46°7′34.8″N 64°10′46.6″W

The Maritime Plain is a physiographic province of the larger Appalachian division. The Maritime Plain runs around the coast of New Brunswick and Nova Scotia from the south shore of Chaleur Bay and includes Prince Edward Island and the Magdalen Islands. The Kouchibouguac National Park lies in the New Brunswick lowlands, part of the Maritime Plain.

== Geology ==
Much of the Maritime Plain consists of Pennsylvanian and earlier sandstone, siltstone and conglomerates.
