= New England Uplands =

Geologic region in the eastern US

The topography of the New England Uplands section is that of a maturely-dissected plateau with narrow valleys, and the entire area is greatly modified by glaciation. It is the most widespread of the geomorphic sections in the New England Province, extending from Canada through New England down to the Seaboard section and extending southwestward through New York and New Jersey as two narrow upland projections, the Reading Prong and the Manhattan Prong. Numerous hills and mountains rise above the general level of the upland; except in the presence of mountains, the horizon of the regional landscape is fairly level. Glaciation has resulted in the erosion and rounding off of the bedrock topography and numerous rock basin lakes. Glacial drift is thin, patchy, and stony, and ice-contact features such as kames, kame terraces, and eskers are abundant. The surface of the New England Uplands slopes southeast from maximum inland altitudes around 670 meters (2,200 feet), excluding the other mountainous sections of the province, to about 122 to 152 meters (400 to 499 ft) along its seaward edge at the narrow coastal Seaboard section, which goes down to sea level.

In the New York Bight watershed, the New England Uplands section is represented by a portion of the Taconic Mountains and its foothills, and by the Reading and Manhattan Prongs that extend southwestward from the New England states. Although geologists refer to the larger of these extensions as the Reading Prong, in this region it is more commonly known as the New York - New Jersey Highlands, and locally as the Hudson Highlands, the New Jersey Highlands, the Ramapo Mountains, or simply the Highlands. The Highlands are bounded on the southeast and on the northwest by the lowlands of the Piedmont and Great Valley provinces, respectively. The mountains and valleys that make up the Highlands are part of a relatively long, linear, and narrow regional geological feature that averages 16 to 32 kilometers (9.9 to 19.9 miles) in width, with a maximum width of 40 kilometers (25 miles), and extends in a southwest–northeast trending direction for nearly 225 kilometers (140 miles), from southeastern Pennsylvania near Reading to southwestern Connecticut near Danbury, where it joins the Taconic Mountains and Housatonic Highlands of the New England Uplands plateau. The Hudson River cuts a deep gorge through the Highlands in New York in the stretch of river between Peekskill on the south and Newburgh on the north.
