= New England province =

The New England province is a physiographic province of the larger Appalachian Highlands division of the United States. The province consists of the Seaboard Lowland, New England Upland, White Mountain, Green Mountain, and Taconic sections.

== Geology ==
Much of the New England province's bedrock aquifers are in consolidated rocks of sedimentary, igneous, and metamorphic origin. Some of these aquifers, mainly in the western portion of Vermont, consist of carbonate rocks, primarily limestone, dolomite, and marble. These consolidated rocks yield water primarily from bedding planes, fractures, joints, and faults, rather than from intergranular pores.

Like the adjacent physiographic provinces, a large part of the New England province was peneplained during the Jurassic and Cretaceous periods, then uplifted, extensively dissected, and finally glaciated.
