= Unglaciated Allegheny Plateau =

Coordinates: 40°N 80°W

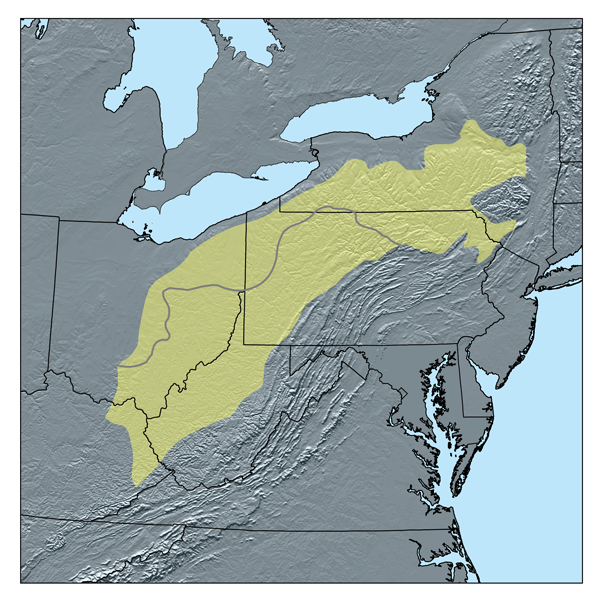
Map of the Allegheny Plateau. The gray line differentiates the glaciated (northern) and unglaciated (southern) sections of the plateau. The unglaciated plateau extends southwestward into eastern Kentucky and Tennessee, where it is called the Cumberland Plateau.

The Unglaciated Allegheny Plateau is located in an arc around southeastern Ohio, West Virginia, into western Pennsylvania and a small portion of southwestern New York State.

This area is a dissected plateau, characterized by sandstone, shale, and many coal seams. This is the part of the Allegheny Plateau that lies outside the continental glaciation of the ice age.

== Geography ==
One of the most spectacular and scenic areas in this region is located in southeast Ohio, and is known as the Hocking Hills region. This area, similar to but smaller than the Red River Gorge in the Cumberland Plateau in Kentucky, features cliffs, rock shelters and waterfalls.

The largest city in the Unglaciated Allegheny Plateau is Pittsburgh, Pennsylvania.

=== Rivers ===
The Ohio River roughly bisects the Unglaciated Allegheny Plateau in generally a north-northeast to south-southwest direction.

Other significant rivers in the plateau include the Muskingum River and Tuscarawas River in Ohio, the Youghiogheny River and Allegheny River in Pennsylvania, and the Monongahela River and Kanawha River in West Virginia. The Kanawha River is formed by the confluence of the New River and the Gauley River. All three rivers are known for their spectacular deep gorges.

== Ecology ==
A variety of species live in the Unglaciated Allegheny Plateau that are different from adjoining four ecological regions of the Appalachian Basin.

For example, the Sugar maple grows well in the Unglaciated Allegheny's middle and lower slopes.

== See also ==
- Geography of Appalachia
