= Judaism in North America =

Judaism in North America includes:

- Judaism in Canada
- Judaism in Mexico
- Judaism in the United States
- Judaism in Greenland
- Judaism in Central America
- Judaism in the Caribbean

== See also ==
- Index of Jewish history–related articles
