= North America =

Continent

- Area: 24.709 million km^{2} (9.54 million sq mi) (3rd)
- Population: ▲592,296,233 (2021; 4th)
- Population density: 25.7/km^{2} (66.4/sq mi) (2021) (Note: This North American density figure is based on a total land area of 23,090,542 km^{2} only, considerably less than the total combined land and water area of 24.709 million km^{2}.)
- GDP (PPP): US$36.6 trillion (2025 est.; 2nd)
- GDP (nominal): US$34.61 trillion (2025 est.; 2nd)
- GDP per capita: US$67,000 (2025 est.; 2nd)
- Religions: Christianity (74.6%); No religion (19.2%); Judaism (1.6%); Islam (1.3%); Hinduism (0.9%); Buddhism (0.9%); Other (1.3%)
- Demonym: North American
- Countries: 23 sovereign states
- Dependencies: 23 non-sovereign territories
- Languages: English, Spanish, French, Dutch, Danish, indigenous languages, and many others
- Time zone: UTC−10:00 to UTC+00:00
- Largest cities: List of urban areas: Mexico City; New York City; Los Angeles; Chicago; San Francisco; Boston; Toronto; Washington; Dallas; Philadelphia
- UN M49 codes: 003 – North America; 019 – Americas; 001 – World

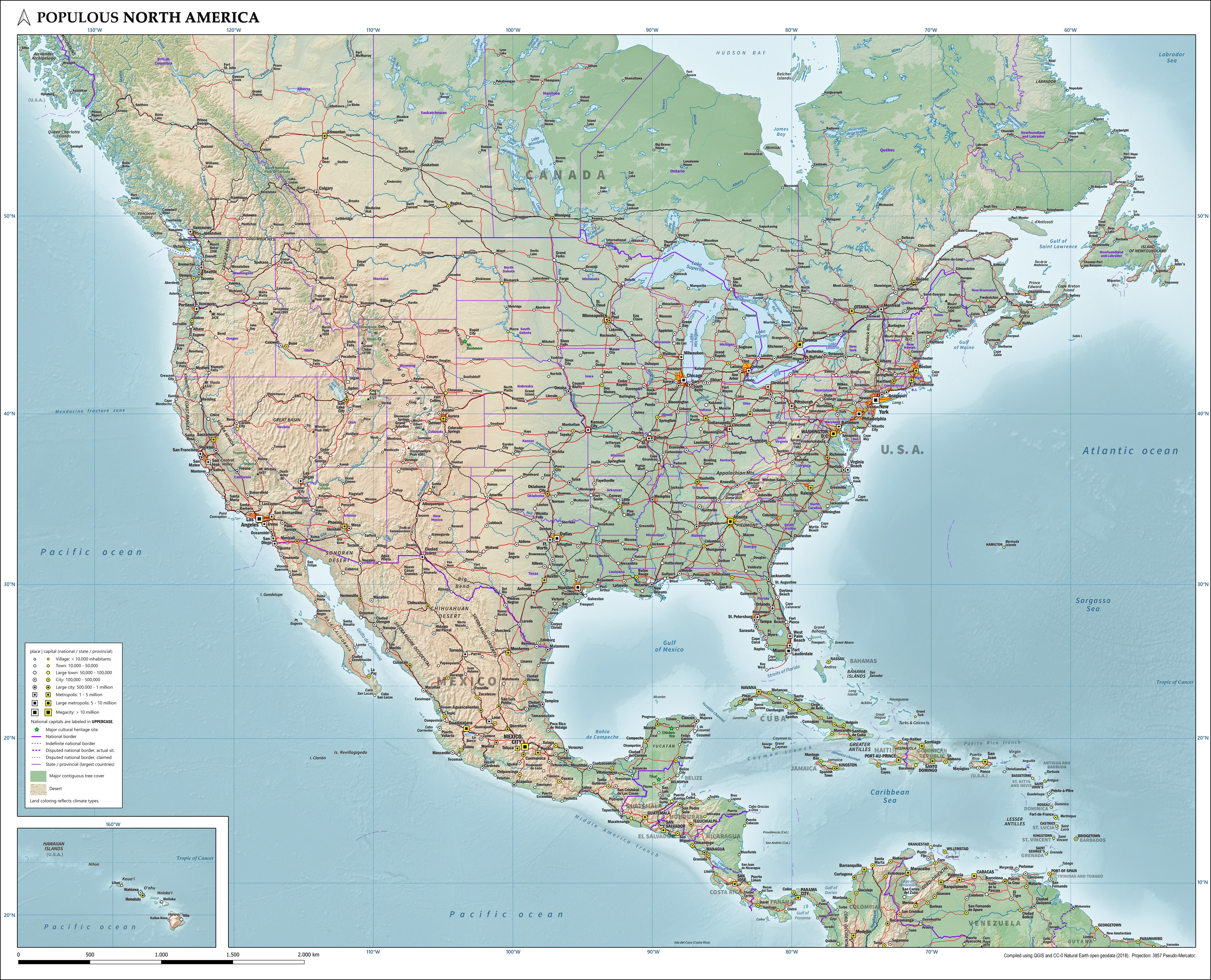
A map of North America's physical, political, and population characteristics as of 2018

North America is a continent (Note: Some countries view the Americas as a single continent, comprising North America and South America.) in the Northern and Western hemispheres. (Note: The Aleutian Islands of Alaska extend into the Eastern Hemisphere.) It is bordered to the north by the Arctic Ocean, to the east by the Atlantic Ocean, to the southeast by South America and the Caribbean Sea, and to the south and west by the Pacific Ocean.

North America covers an area of around 24,709,000 square kilometers (9,540,000 square miles), representing approximately 16.5% of Earth's land area and 4.8% of its total surface area. It is the third-largest continent by size after Asia and Africa, and the fourth-largest continent by population after Asia, Africa, and Europe. As of 2021, North America's population is estimated at over 592 million people in 23 independent states and territories, or about 7.5% of the world's population.

The continent includes the subregions of Northern America (comprising Canada, Greenland, and the continental United States as well as the insular territories of Bermuda and Saint Pierre and Miquelon) and Middle America (comprising Mexico, Central America and the Caribbean). In human geography, the terms "North America" and "North American" often refer to just Northern America.

It is unknown exactly how and when the first human populations reached North America. People are known to have lived in the Americas at least 20,000 years ago, but various evidence points to possibly earlier dates. The Paleo-Indian period in North America followed the Last Glacial Period, and it lasted until about 10,000 years ago when the Archaic period began. The classic stage followed the Archaic period, and lasted from approximately the 6th to 13th centuries. Norse exploration and colonization began in the late 10th century; the Norse built several settlements in Greenland and at least one settlement in Newfoundland.

Beginning in 1492, the voyages of Christopher Columbus led to a transatlantic exchange, including migrations of European settlers during the Age of Discovery and the early modern period. Present-day cultural and ethnic patterns reflect interactions between early European colonists, indigenous peoples, enslaved Africans, later immigrants from Europe and Asia, and descendants of these respective groups. European colonization has led to most North Americans speaking European languages (such as English, Spanish, and French), and the cultures of the region commonly reflect Western traditions. However, there remain significant indigenous populations that continue to adhere to their respective pre-colonial cultural and linguistic traditions.

== Name ==
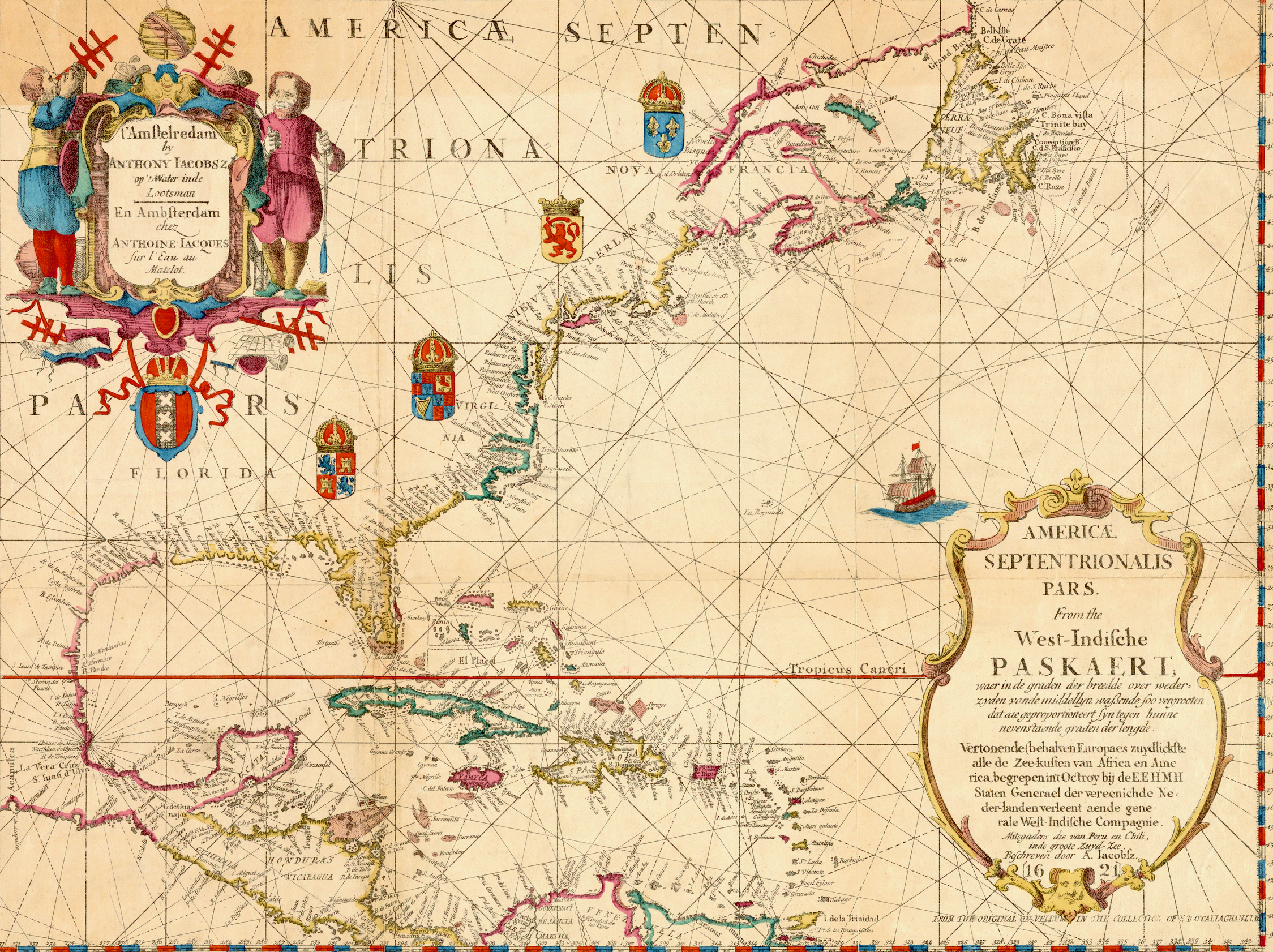
A 1621 map of North America

A 1908 map of North America, published in The Harmsworth atlas and Gazetteer

The Americas were named after the Italian explorer Amerigo Vespucci by German cartographers Martin Waldseemüller and Matthias Ringmann. Vespucci explored South America between 1497 and 1502, and was the first European to suggest that the Americas represented a landmass then unknown to the Europeans. In 1507, Waldseemüller published a world map, and he placed the word "America" on the continent of present-day South America. The continent north of present-day Mexico was then referred to as Parias. On a 1553 world map published by Petrus Apianus, North America was called "Baccalearum", meaning "realm of the Cod fish", in reference to the abundance of cod on the East Coast.

Waldseemüller used the Latinized version of Vespucci's name, Americus Vespucius, in its feminine form of "America", following the examples of "Europa", "Asia", and "Africa". Americus originated from Medieval Latin Emericus (see Saint Emeric of Hungary), coming from the Old High German name Emmerich. Map makers later extended the name America to North America.

In 1538, Gerardus Mercator used the term America on his world map of the entire Western Hemisphere. On his subsequent 1569 map, Mercator called North America "America or New India" (America sive India Nova).

The Spanish Empire called its territories in North and South America "Las Indias", and the name given to the state body that oversaw the region was called the Council of the Indies.

== Definition ==
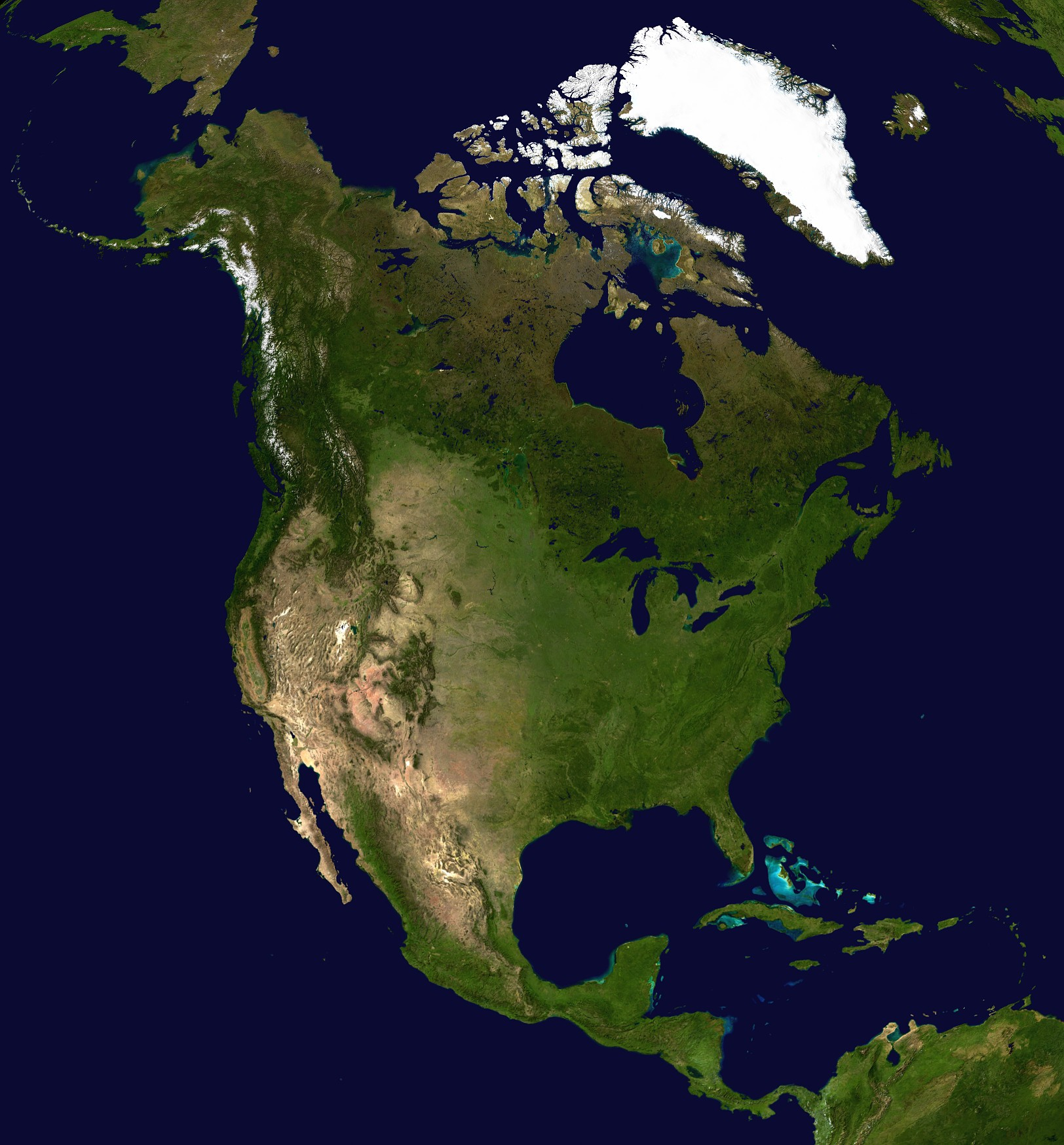
A 2005 NASA satellite image of North America

The United Nations and its statistics division recognize North America as comprising three subregions: Northern America, Central America (which includes Mexico), and the Caribbean. In the limited context of regional trade agreements such as NAFTA, the term is used to reference three countries: Canada, Mexico, and the United States.

According to the six-continent model, which is prevalent in Latin America and across the Romance-speaking world as well as in Greece, "North America" designates a subregion comprising Canada, Mexico, Saint Pierre and Miquelon, and the United States; and often Bermuda, Clipperton Island, and Greenland.

North America has historically been known by other names, including Spanish North America, New Spain, New France, British North America and América Septentrional, the first official name given to Mexico.

=== Regions ===
North America includes several regions and subregions, each of which have its own respective cultural, economic, and geographic regions. Economic regions include several regions formalized in 20th- and 21st-century trade agreements, including NAFTA between Canada, Mexico, and the United States, and CAFTA between Central America, the Dominican Republic, and the United States.

North America is divided linguistically and culturally into two primary regions, Anglo-America and Latin America. Anglo-America includes most of North America, Belize, and Caribbean islands with English-speaking populations. There are also regions, including Louisiana and Quebec, with large Francophone populations; in Quebec and Saint Pierre and Miquelon, French is the official language.

The southern portion of North America includes Central America and non-English-speaking Caribbean nations. The north of the continent maintains recognized regions as well. In contrast to the common definition of North America, which encompasses the whole North American continent, the term "North America" is sometimes used more narrowly to refer only to four nations, Canada, Greenland, Mexico, and the U.S. The U.S. Census Bureau includes Saint Pierre and Miquelon, but excludes Mexico from its definition.

The term Northern America refers to the northernmost countries and territories of North America: the U.S., Bermuda, Canada, Greenland, and St. Pierre and Miquelon. Although the term does not refer to a unified region, Middle America includes Mexico, Central America, and the Caribbean.

North America's largest countries by land area are Canada and the U.S., both of which have well-defined and recognized subregions. In Canada, these include (from east to west) Atlantic Canada, Central Canada, the Canadian Prairies, the British Columbia Coast, Western Canada, and Northern Canada. In the U.S., they include New England, the Mid-Atlantic, and the South Atlantic, East North Central, West North Central, East South Central, West South Central, Mountain, and Pacific states. The Great Lakes region and the Pacific Northwest include areas in both the U.S. and Canada.

== History ==
=== Pre-Columbian era ===
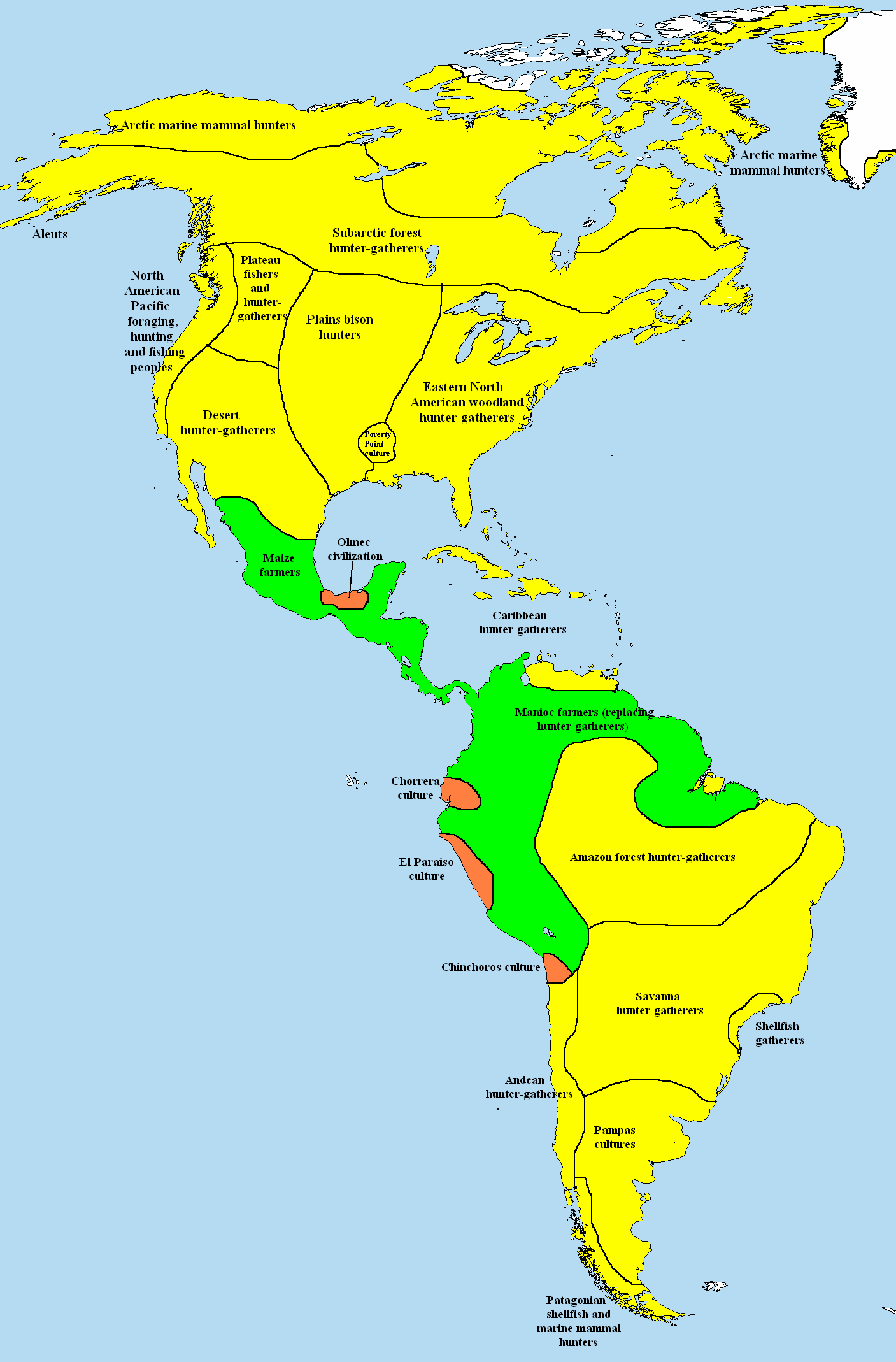
A map of subsistence methods in the Americas, including North America, as of 1000 BCE Hunter-gatherers Simple farming societies Complex agricultural societies, including tribal chiefdoms and civilizations

The indigenous peoples of the Americas have many creation myths, some of which assert that they have been present on the land since its creation, but there is no evidence that humans evolved there. The specifics of the initial settlement of the Americas by ancient Asians are subject to ongoing research and discussion. The traditional theory has been that hunters entered the Bering Land Bridge between eastern Siberia and present-day Alaska from 27,000 to 14,000 years ago. (Note: The receding of oceans during successive ice ages may have enabled migrants to cross the land bridge as far back as 40,000 years.) A growing viewpoint is that the first American inhabitants sailed from Beringia some 13,000 years ago, with widespread habitation of the Americas during the end of the Last Glacial Period, in what is known as the Late Glacial Maximum, around 12,500 years ago. The oldest petroglyphs in North America date from 15,000 to 10,000 years before present. Genetic research and anthropology indicate additional waves of migration from Asia via the Bering Strait during the Early-Middle Holocene.

Prior to the arrival of European explorers and colonists in North America, the natives of North America were divided into many different polities, ranging from small bands of a few families to large empires. They lived in several cultural regions, which roughly correspond to geographic and biological zones that defined the representative cultures and lifestyles of the indigenous people who lived there, including the bison hunters of the Great Plains and the farmers of Mesoamerica. Native groups are also classified by their language families, which included Athabaskan and Uto-Aztecan languages. Indigenous peoples with similar languages did not always share the same material culture, however, and were not necessarily always allies. Anthropologists speculate that the Inuit of the high Arctic arrived in North America much later than other native groups, evidenced by the disappearance of Dorset culture artifacts from the archaeological record and their replacement by the Thule people.

During the thousands of years of native habitation on the continent, cultures changed and shifted. One of the oldest yet discovered is the Clovis culture (c. 9550–9050 BCE) in modern New Mexico. Following the early Archaic period, major regional developments included the Mississippian culture (spanning the Mississippi River valley with platform-mound urban centers) and the Ancestral Puebloans of the Four Corners region. The more southern cultural groups of North America were responsible for the domestication of many common crops now used around the world, such as tomatoes, squash, and maize. As a result of the development of agriculture in the south, many other cultural advances were made there. The Mayans developed a writing system, built huge pyramids and temples, had a complex calendar, and developed the concept of zero around 400 CE.

The first recorded European references to North America are in Norse sagas where it is referred to as Vinland. The earliest verifiable instance of pre-Columbian trans-oceanic contact by any European culture with the North American mainland has been dated to around 1000 CE. The site, situated at the northernmost extent of the island named Newfoundland, has provided unmistakable evidence of Norse settlement. Norse explorer Leif Erikson (c. 970–1020 CE) is thought to have visited the area. (Note: Descriptions of sites Erikson explored seem to correspond to Baffin Island, the Labrador coast near Cape Porcupine, as well as Belle Isle, and a site which led him to name the country Vinland ('Wineland').) Erikson was the first European to make landfall on the continent (excluding Greenland).

The Mayan culture was still present in southern Mexico and Guatemala when the Spanish conquistadors arrived. However, political dominance in the area had shifted to the Aztec Empire, whose capital city, Tenochtitlan, was located further north in the Valley of Mexico. The Aztecs were conquered in 1521 by Hernán Cortés.

=== Post-contact, 1492–1910 ===
World map of German cartographer Martin Waldseemüller (Germany, 1507), which first used the name America

A 1702 map of North America showing forts, towns, and (in solid colors) areas occupied by European colonial settlements

During the so-called Age of Discovery, Europeans explored overseas and staked claims to various parts of North America, much of which was already settled by indigenous peoples. Upon Europeans' arrival in the "New World", indigenous peoples had a variety of reactions, including curiosity, trading, cooperation, resignation, and resistance. The indigenous population declined substantially following European arrival, primarily due to the introduction of Eurasian diseases, such as smallpox, to which the indigenous peoples lacked immunity, and because of violent conflicts with Europeans. Indigenous culture changed significantly, and their affiliation with political and cultural groups also changed. Several linguistic groups died out, and others changed quite quickly.

On North America's southeastern coast, Spanish explorer Juan Ponce de León, who had accompanied Columbus's second voyage, visited and named La Florida in 1513. As the colonial period unfolded, Spain, England, and France appropriated and claimed extensive territories on North America's eastern and southern coastlines. Spain established permanent settlements on the Caribbean islands of Hispaniola and Cuba in the 1490s, building cities, putting the resident indigenous populations to work, raising crops for Spanish settlers, and panning for gold to enrich the Spaniards. Much of the indigenous population died due to disease and overwork, spurring the Spaniards on to claim new lands and peoples. An expedition under the command of Spanish settler Hernán Cortés sailed westward in 1519 to what turned out to be the mainland in Mexico. With local indigenous allies, the Spanish conquered the Aztec empire in central Mexico in 1521. Spain then established permanent cities in Mexico, Central America, and Spanish South America in the sixteenth century. Once Spaniards conquered the high civilization of the Aztecs and Incas, the Caribbean was a backwater of the Spanish empire.

Other European powers began to intrude on areas claimed by Spain, including the Caribbean islands. France took the western half of Hispaniola and developed Saint-Domingue as a cane sugar-producing colony worked by black slave labor. Britain took Barbados and Jamaica, and the Dutch and Danes took islands previously claimed by Spain. Britain did not begin settling on the North American mainland until a hundred years after the first Spanish settlements, since it sought first to control nearby Ireland.

=== English settlements ===
The first permanent English settlement was in Jamestown, Virginia, in 1607, followed by additional colonial establishments on the east coast from present-day Georgia in the south to Massachusetts in the north, forming the Thirteen Colonies of British America. The English did not establish settlements north or east of the St. Lawrence Valley in present-day Canada until after the conclusion of the American Revolutionary War. Britain's early settlements in present-day Canada included St. John's, Newfoundland, in 1630 and Halifax, Nova Scotia, in 1749. The first permanent French settlement was in Quebec City, Quebec, established in 1608.

=== Seven Years' War ===
With the British victory in the Seven Years' War, France in 1763 ceded to Britain its claims to North American territories east of the Mississippi River. Spain, in turn, gained rights to the territories west of the Mississippi, which then served as a border between Spain and Britain's territorial claims. French colonists settled Illinois Country after several generations of experience in North America, migrating over the Mississippi River to regions where Spain was not present and where they were able to leverage their earlier Louisiana French settlements around the Gulf of Mexico. These early French settlers partnered with Midwest indigenous tribes, and their mixed-ancestry descendants later followed a westward expansion all the way to the Pacific Ocean on the present-day U.S. West Coast.

=== American Revolution ===
In 1776, after various attempts to reconcile differences with the British, the Thirteen Colonies in British America sent delegates to the Second Continental Congress in Philadelphia, which unanimously adopted the Declaration of Independence on July 4, 1776, written primarily by Thomas Jefferson, a member of the Committee of Five charged by the Second Continental Congress with authoring it. In the Declaration, the thirteen colonies declared their independence from the British monarchy, then governed by King George III, and detailed the factors that contributed to their decision. With the signing and issuance of the Declaration of Independence, the thirteen colonies formalized and escalated the American Revolutionary War, which had begun the year before at the Battles of Lexington and Concord on April 19, 1775. Gathered in Philadelphia following the war's outbreak, delegates from the thirteen colonies established the Continental Army from various patriot militias then engaged in resisting the British, and appointed George Washington as the Continental Army's military commander.

As the American Revolutionary War progressed, France and Spain—both then enemies of Britain—began to see the promise of a potential American victory in the war, and they began supporting Washington and the American Revolutionary cause. The British Army, in turn, was supported by Hessian military units from present-day Germany.

In 1783, after an eight-year attempt to defeat the American rebellion, King George III acknowledged Britain's defeat in the war, leading to the signing of the Treaty of Paris on September 3, 1783, which solidified the sovereign establishment of the United States.

=== Westward expansion ===
European colonization of North America and the Territorial evolution of the United States by Gustav Droysen

By the late 18th century, Russia was established on the Pacific Northwest northern coastline, where it was engaged in maritime fur trade and was supported by various indigenous settlements in the region. As a result, the Spanish were showing more interest in controlling the trade on the Pacific coast and mapped most of its coastline. The first Spanish settlements were attempted in Alta California during that period. Numerous overland explorations associated with voyageurs, fur trade, and U.S. led expeditions, including the Lewis and Clark, Frémont, and Wilkes expeditions, reached the Pacific.

In 1803, during the presidency of Thomas Jefferson, the third U.S. president, Napoleon Bonaparte sold France's remaining North American territorial claims, which included regions west of the Mississippi River, to the U.S. in the Louisiana Purchase. Spain and the U.S. settled their western boundary dispute in 1819 in the Adams–Onís Treaty. Mexico fought a lengthy war for independence from Spain, winning it for Mexico (which included Central America at the time) in 1821. The U.S. sought further westward expansion and fought the Mexican–American War, gaining a vast territory that first Spain and then Mexico claimed but which they did not effectively control. Much of the area was in fact dominated by indigenous peoples, who did not recognize the claims of Spain, France, or the U.S. Russia sold its North American claims, which included the present-day U.S. state of Alaska, to the U.S. in 1867.

=== Canada and Panama Canal ===
In 1867, colonial settlers north of the United States, unified as the Dominion of Canada. The U.S. sought to dig a canal across the Isthmus of Panama in present-day Panama in Central America, then a part of present-day Colombia. The U.S. aided Panamanians in a war that resulted in its separation from Colombia. The U.S. subsequently carved out the Panama Canal Zone and claimed sovereignty over it. After decades of work, the Panama Canal was completed, which connected the Atlantic and Pacific oceans in 1913 and greatly facilitated global shipping navigation.

== Geography ==
North America's landforms and land cover depicted in a 2021 map

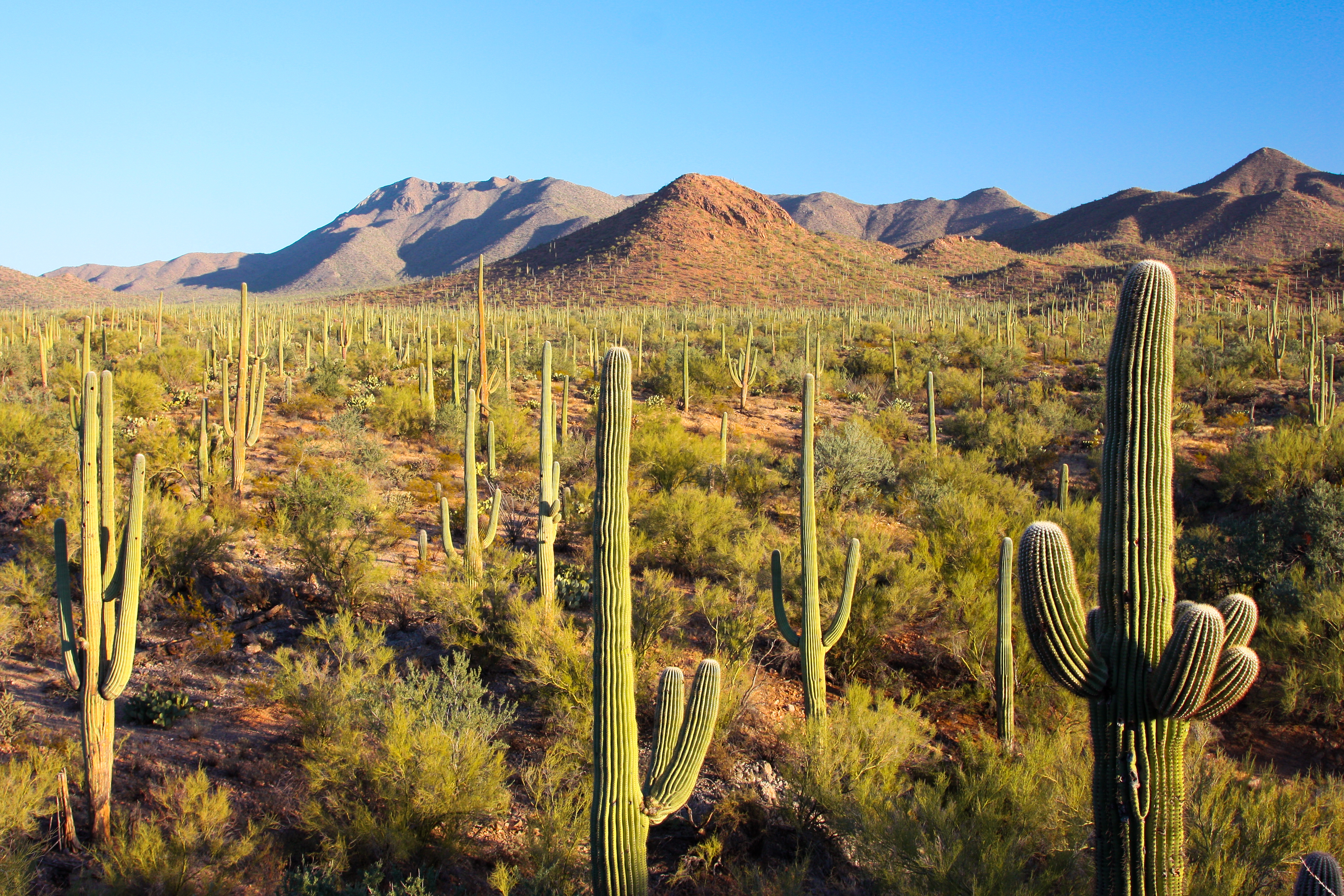
The Sonoran Desert in Arizona

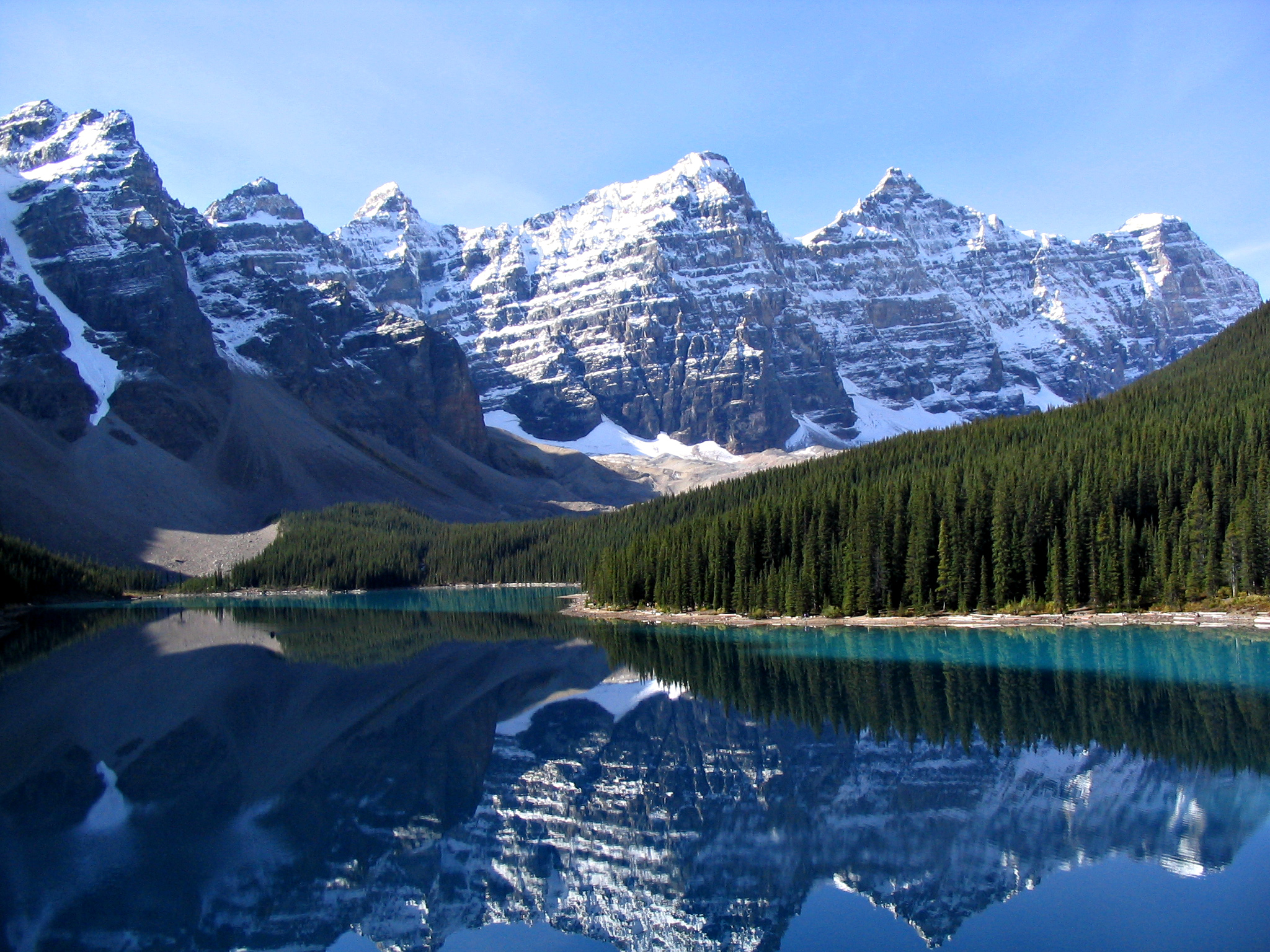
Moraine Lake in Banff National Park in Alberta

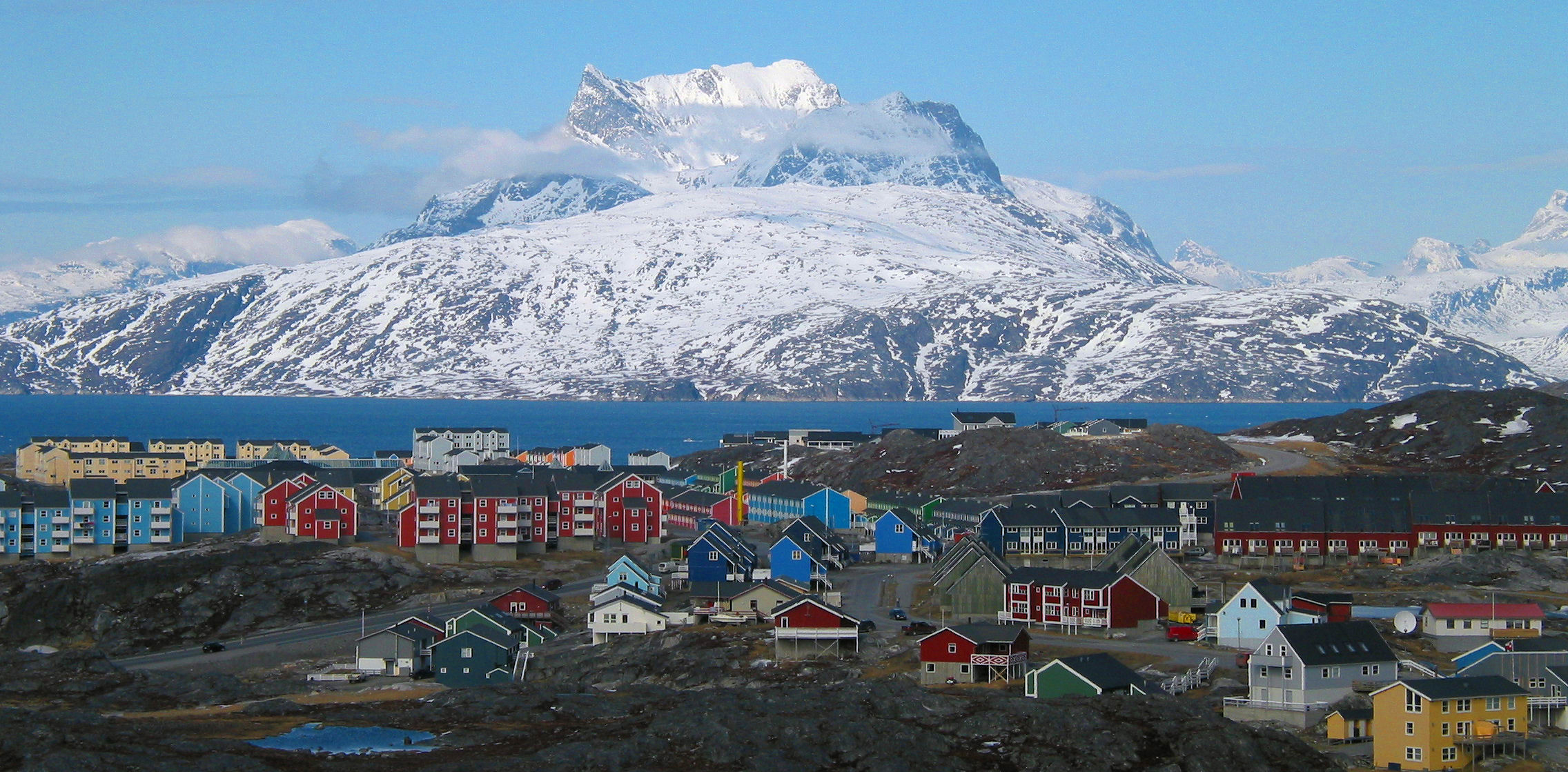
Nuuk, the capital of Greenland

North America occupies the northern portion of the landmass generally referred to as the New World, the Western Hemisphere, the Americas, or simply America, which, in many countries, is considered a single continent with North America a subcontinent. North America is the third-largest continent by area after Asia and Africa.

North America's only land connection to South America is in present-day Panama at the Darien Gap on the Colombia–Panama border, placing almost all of Panama within North America. Alternatively, some geologists physiographically locate its southern limit at the Isthmus of Tehuantepec, Mexico, with Central America extending southeastward to South America from this point. The Caribbean islands, or West Indies, are considered part of North America. The continental coastline is long and irregular. The Gulf of Mexico is the largest body of water indenting the continent, followed by Hudson Bay. Others include the Gulf of Saint Lawrence and the Gulf of California.

Before the Central American isthmus formed, the region had been underwater. The islands of the West Indies delineate a submerged former land bridge, which had connected North and South America via what are now Florida and Venezuela.

There are several islands off the continent's coasts; principally, the Arctic Archipelago, the Bahamas, Turks and Caicos, the Greater and Lesser Antilles, the Aleutian Islands (some of which are in the Eastern Hemisphere proper), the Alexander Archipelago, the many thousand islands of the British Columbia Coast, and Newfoundland. Greenland, a self-governing Danish island and the world's largest, is on the same tectonic plate (the North American Plate) and is part of North America geographically. In a geologic sense, Bermuda is not part of the Americas, but an oceanic island that was formed on the fissure of the Mid-Atlantic Ridge over 100 million years ago (mya). The nearest landmass to it is Cape Hatteras, North Carolina. However, Bermuda is often thought of as part of North America, especially given its historical, political, and cultural ties to Virginia and other parts of the continent.

The vast majority of North America is on the North American Plate. Parts of western Mexico, including Baja California, and of California, including the cities of San Diego, Los Angeles, and Santa Cruz, lie on the eastern edge of the Pacific Plate, with the two plates meeting along the San Andreas Fault. The southernmost portion of the continent and much of the West Indies lie on the Caribbean Plate, whereas the Juan de Fuca Plate and Cocos Plate border the North American Plate on its western frontier.

The continent can be divided into four great regions (each of which contains many subregions): the Great Plains stretching from the Gulf of Mexico to the Canadian Arctic; the geologically young, mountainous west, including the Rocky Mountains, the Great Basin, California, and Alaska; the raised but relatively flat plateau of the Canadian Shield in the northeast; and the varied eastern region, which includes the Appalachian Mountains, the coastal plain along the Atlantic seaboard, and the Florida peninsula. Mexico, with its long plateaus and cordilleras, falls largely in the western region, although the eastern coastal plain does extend south along the Gulf.

The western mountains are split in the middle into the main range of the Rockies and the coastal ranges in California, Oregon, Washington, and British Columbia, with the Great Basin—a lower area containing smaller ranges and low-lying deserts—in between. The highest peak is Denali (also called Mount McKinley) in Alaska.

The U.S. Geological Survey (USGS) states that the geographic center of North America is "6 miles [10 km] west of Balta, Pierce County, North Dakota" at about 48°10′N 100°10′W, about 24 kilometers (15 mi) from Rugby, North Dakota. The USGS further states that "No marked or monumented point has been established by any government agency as the geographic center of either the 50 states, the conterminous United States, or the North American continent." Nonetheless, there is a 4.6-meter (15 ft) field stone obelisk in Rugby claiming to mark the center. The North American continental pole of inaccessibility is located 1,650 km (1,030 mi) from the nearest coastline, between Allen and Kyle, South Dakota, at 43.36°N 101.97°W.

=== Canada ===
Canada can be divided into roughly seven physiographic divisions:

1. The Canadian Shield
2. The Interior Plains
3. The Great Lakes-St. Lawrence Lowlands
4. The Appalachian region
5. The Western Cordillera
6. Hudson Bay Lowlands
7. Arctic Archipelago

=== United States ===
The lower 48 U.S. states can be divided into roughly eight physiographic divisions:

1. The Intermontane Plateaus
2. The Laurentian Upland, part of the Canadian Shield, northern portion of the upper Midwestern U.S.
3. The Interior Plains
4. The Atlantic Plain
5. The Appalachian Highlands
6. The Interior Highlands
7. The Rocky Mountain system
8. The Pacific Mountain system

=== Mexico ===
Mexico can be divided into roughly fifteen physiographic divisions:

1. The Baja California Peninsula
2. The Sonoran Basin and Range
3. The Western Sierra Madre
4. The Northern Mountains and Plains
5. The Eastern Sierra Madre
6. The Great Plain
7. The Pacific Coastal Plain
8. The Northern Gulf Coast Plain
9. The Central Plateau
10. The Volcanic Axis
11. The Southern Sierra Madre
12. The Southern Gulf Coast Plain
13. The Chiapas Sierra Madre
14. The Chiapas Highlands
15. The Yucatán Peninsula

=== Climate ===
A Köppen climate classification map of North America

North America is a very large continent that extends from north of the Arctic Circle to south of the Tropic of Cancer. Greenland, along with the Canadian Shield, is tundra with average temperatures ranging from 10 to 20 °C (50 to 68 °F), but central Greenland is composed of a very large ice sheet. This tundra radiates throughout Canada, but its border ends near the Rocky Mountains (but still contains Alaska) and at the end of the Canadian Shield, near the Great Lakes. Climate west of the Cascade Range is described as temperate weather with average precipitation of 20 inches (510 millimeters). Climate in coastal California is described as being Mediterranean, with average temperatures in cities such as San Francisco ranging from 57 to 70 °F (14 to 21 °C) over the course of the year.

Stretching from the East Coast to eastern North Dakota, and stretching down to Kansas, is the humid continental climate, featuring intense seasons with a large amount of annual precipitation, with places such as New York City averaging 50 in (1,300 mm). Starting at the southern border of the humid continental climate and stretching to the Gulf of Mexico (while encompassing the eastern half of Texas) is the humid subtropical climate. This area has the wettest cities in the contiguous U.S., with annual precipitation reaching 67 in (1,700 mm) in Mobile, Alabama. Stretching from the borders of the humid continental and subtropical climates, and going west to the Sierra Nevada, south to the southern tip of Durango, north to the border with tundra climate, the steppe/desert climates are the driest in the U.S. Highland climates cut from north to south of the continent, where subtropical or temperate climates occur just below the tropics, as in central Mexico and Guatemala. Tropical climates appear in the island regions and in the subcontinent's bottleneck, found in countries and states bathed by the Caribbean Sea or to the south of the Gulf of Mexico and the Pacific Ocean. Precipitation patterns vary across the region, and as such rainforest, monsoon, and savanna types can be found, with rains and high temperatures throughout the year.

=== Ecology ===
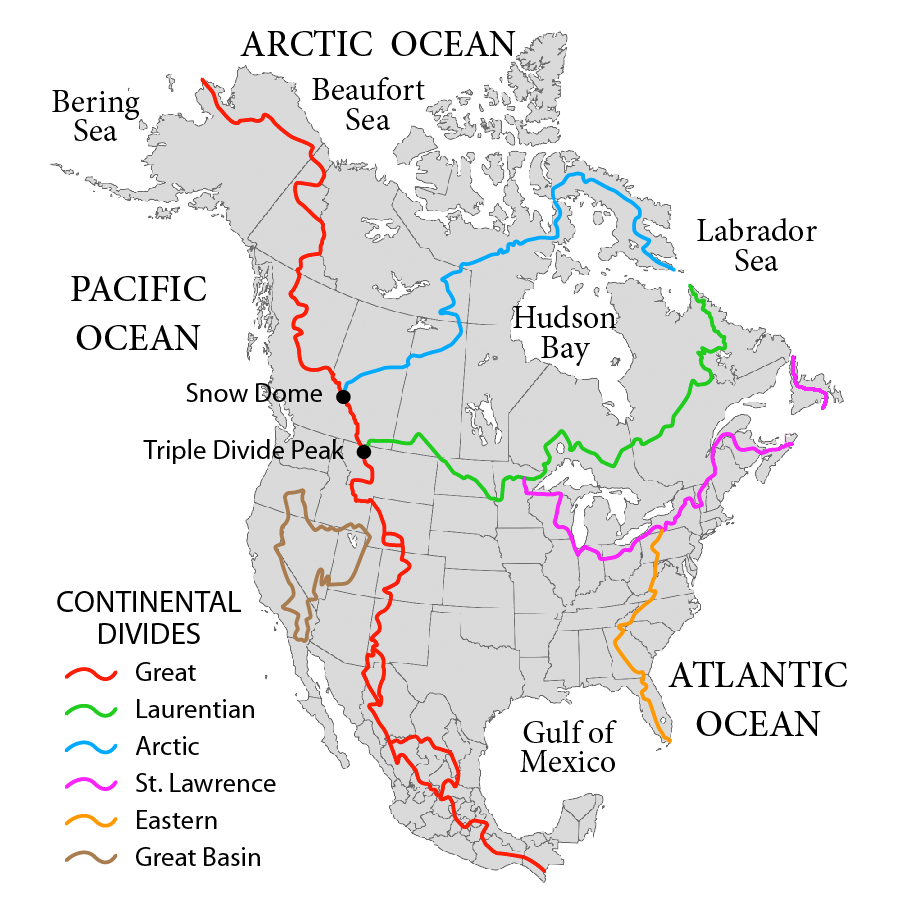
The principal water divisions in Canada, the United States, and Mexico

Notable North American fauna include the bison, black bear, jaguar, cougar, prairie dog, turkey, pronghorn, raccoon, coyote, and monarch butterfly. Notable plants that were domesticated in North America include tobacco, maize, squash, tomato, sunflower, blueberry, avocado, cotton, chile pepper, and vanilla.

=== Geology ===
==== Geologic history ====
Laurentia is an ancient craton that forms the geologic core of North America; it formed between 1.5 and 1.0 billion years ago during the Proterozoic eon. The Canadian Shield is the largest exposure of this craton. From the Late Paleozoic to Early Mesozoic eras, North America was joined with the other modern-day continents as part of the supercontinent Pangaea, with Eurasia to its east. One of the results of the formation of Pangaea was the Appalachian Mountains, which formed some 480 mya, making it among the oldest mountain ranges in the world. When Pangaea began to rift around 200 mya, North America became part of Laurasia, before it separated from Eurasia as its own continent during the mid-Cretaceous period. The Rockies and other western mountain ranges began forming around this time from a period of mountain building called the Laramide orogeny, between 80 and 55 mya. The formation of the Isthmus of Panama that connected the continent to South America arguably occurred approximately 12 to 15 mya, and the Great Lakes (as well as many other northern freshwater lakes and rivers) were carved by receding glaciers about 10,000 years ago.

North America is the source of much of what humanity knows about geologic time periods. The geographic area that would later become the United States has been the source of more varieties of dinosaurs than any other modern country. According to paleontologist Peter Dodson, this is primarily due to stratigraphy, climate and geography, human resources, and history. Much of the Mesozoic Era is represented by exposed outcrops in the many arid regions of the continent. The most significant Late Jurassic dinosaur-bearing fossil deposit in North America is the Morrison Formation of the western U.S.

==== Canada ====
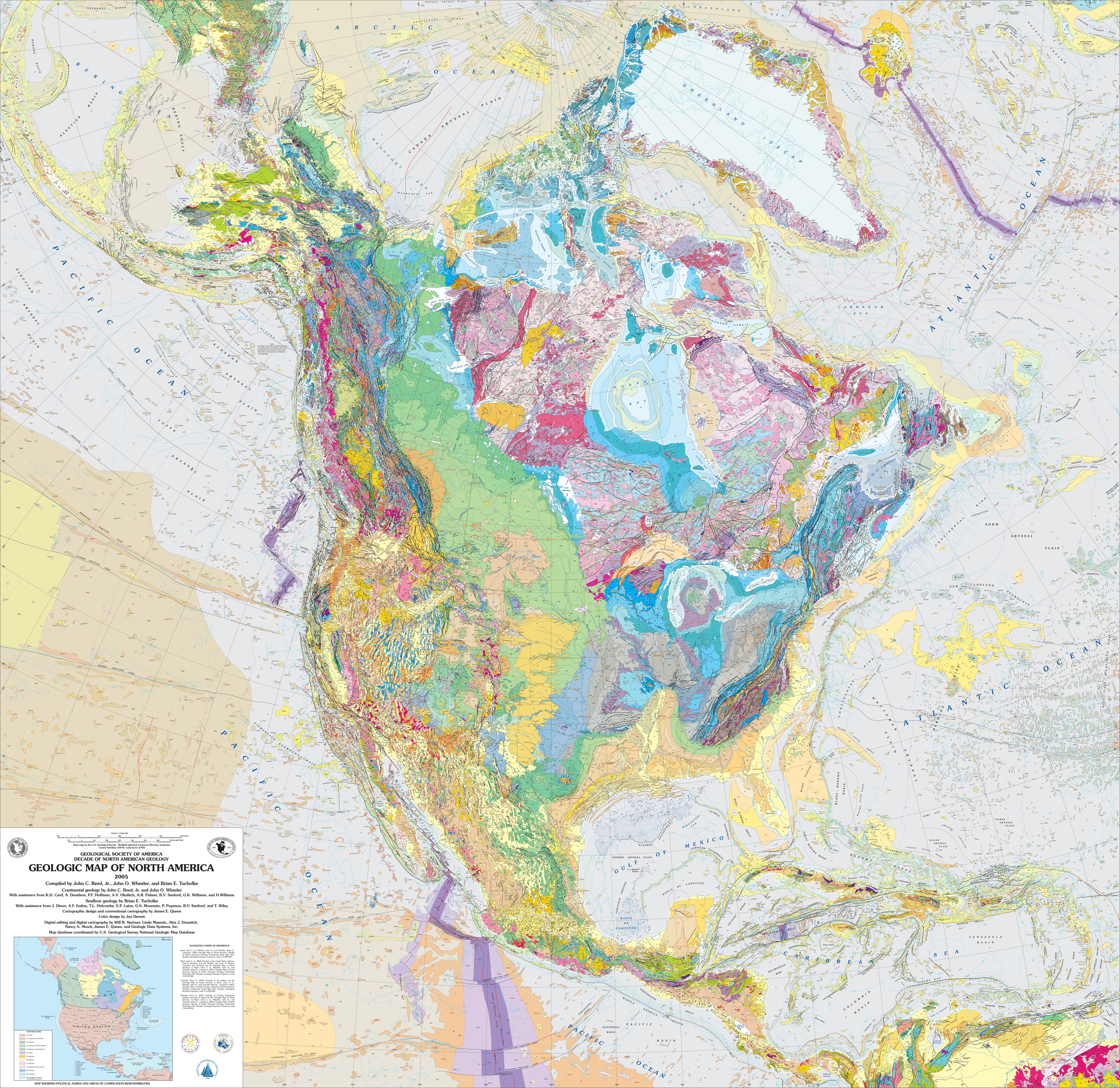
A geologic map of North America published by the U.S. Geological Survey

Canada is geologically one of the oldest regions in the world, with more than half of the region consisting of Precambrian rocks that have been above sea level since the beginning of the Palaeozoic era. Canada's mineral resources are diverse and extensive. Across the Canadian Shield and in the north, there are large iron, nickel, zinc, copper, gold, lead, molybdenum, and uranium reserves. Large diamond concentrations have been recently developed in the Arctic, making Canada one of the world's largest producers. Throughout the Shield, there are many mining towns extracting these minerals. The largest, and best known, is Sudbury, Ontario. Sudbury is an exception to the normal process of forming minerals in the Shield since there is significant evidence that the Sudbury Basin is an ancient meteorite impact crater. The nearby, but less-known Temagami Magnetic Anomaly has striking similarities to the Sudbury Basin. Its magnetic anomalies are very similar to the Sudbury Basin, and so it could be a second metal-rich impact crater. The Shield is also covered by vast boreal forests that support an important logging industry.

==== United States ====
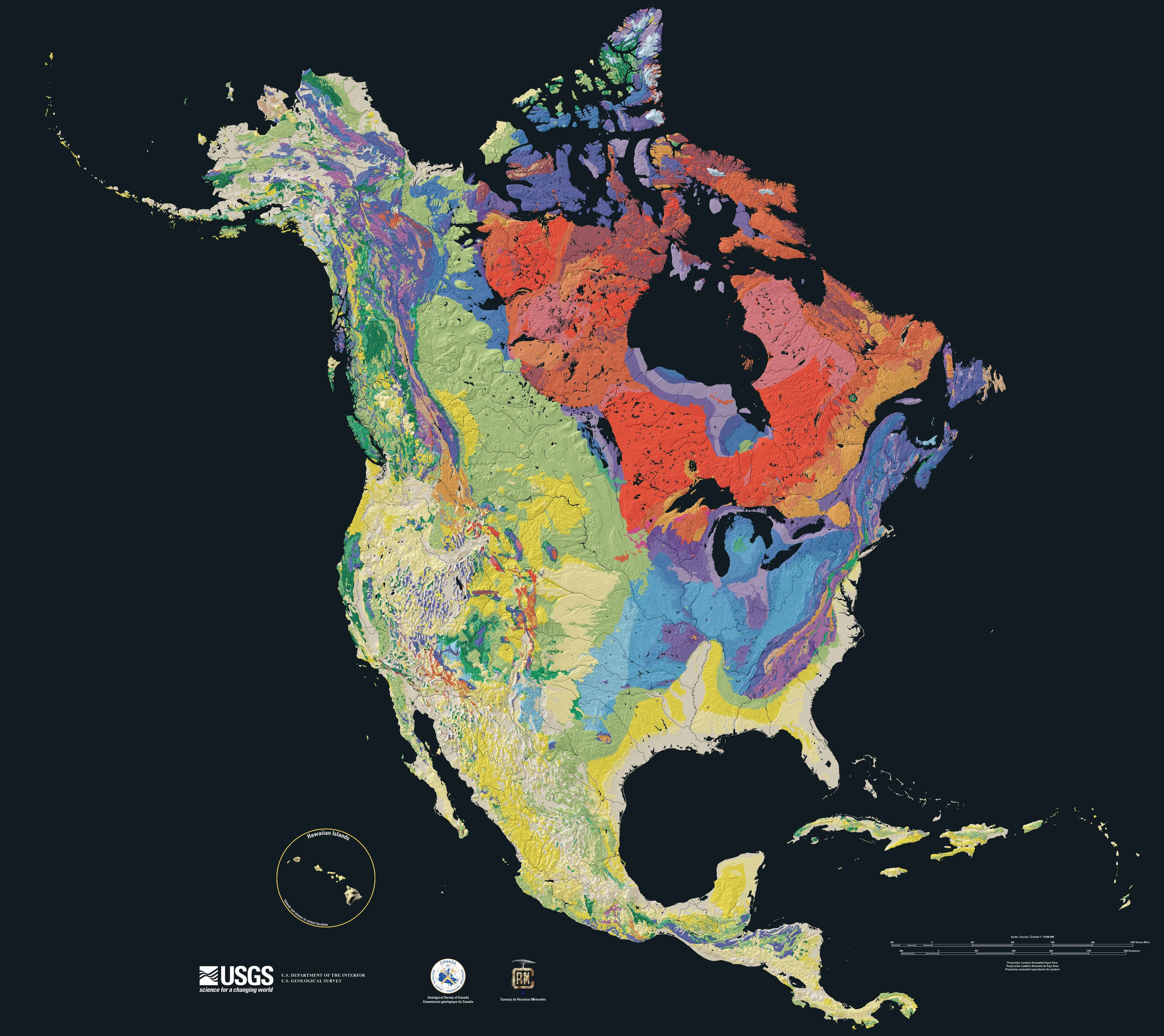
A 2003 image of North America's bedrock and terrain

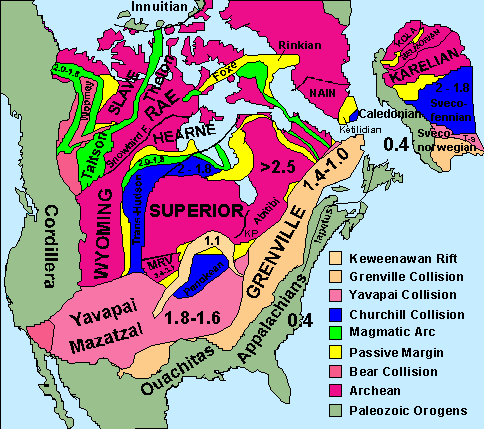
A 2015 map of North America's cratons and basement rocks

The United States can be divided into twelve main geological provinces:

1. Pacific
2. Columbia Plateau
3. Basin and Range
4. Colorado Plateau
5. Rocky Mountains
6. Laurentian Upland
7. Interior Plains
8. Interior Highlands
9. Appalachian Highlands
10. Atlantic Plain
11. Alaskan
12. Hawaiian

Each province has its own geologic history and unique features. The geology of Alaska is typical of that of the cordillera, while the major islands of Hawaii consist of Neogene volcanics erupted over a hot spot.

==== Central America ====
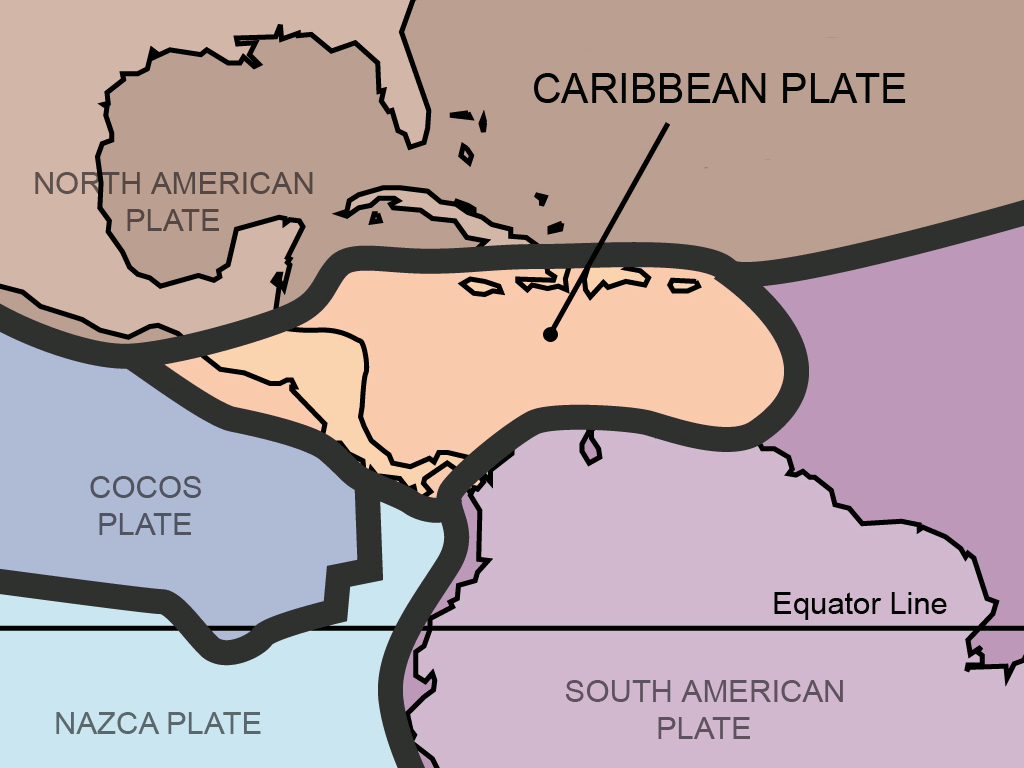
Central America rests on the Caribbean Plate.

Central America is geologically active with volcanic eruptions and earthquakes occurring from time to time. In 1976 Guatemala was hit by a major earthquake, killing 23,000 people; Managua, the capital of Nicaragua, was devastated by earthquakes in 1931 and 1972, the last one killing about 5,000 people; three earthquakes devastated El Salvador, one in 1986 and two in 2001; one earthquake devastated northern and central Costa Rica in 2009, killing at least 34 people; in Honduras a powerful earthquake killed seven people in 2009.

Volcanic eruptions are common in the region. In 1968, the Arenal Volcano, in Costa Rica, erupted and killed 87 people. Fertile soils from weathered volcanic lavas have made it possible to sustain dense populations in agriculturally productive highland areas.

Central America has many mountain ranges; the longest are the Sierra Madre de Chiapas, the Cordillera Isabelia, and the Cordillera de Talamanca. Between the mountain ranges lie fertile valleys that are suitable for the people; in fact, most of the population of Honduras, Costa Rica, and Guatemala live in valleys. Valleys are also suitable for the production of coffee, beans, and other crops.

== List of states and territories ==
Arms	Flag	Country / Territory	Area	Population (2021)	Population density	Capital	Name(s) in official language(s)	ISO 3166-1
Anguilla	Flag of Anguilla	Anguilla (United Kingdom)	91 km^{2} (35 sq mi)	15,753	164.8/km^{2} (427/sq mi)	The Valley	Anguilla	AIA
Antigua and Barbuda	Flag of Antigua and Barbuda	Antigua and Barbuda	442 km^{2} (171 sq mi)	93,219	199.1/km^{2} (516/sq mi)	St. John's	Antigua and Barbuda	ATG
Aruba	Flag of Aruba	Aruba (Kingdom of the Netherlands) (Note: Depending on the definition, Panama could be considered a transcontinental country while the ABC islands (Aruba, Bonaire, and Curaçao) and Trinidad and Tobago could be considered either parts of North America or South America.)	180 km^{2} (69 sq mi)	106,537	594.4/km^{2} (1,539/sq mi)	Oranjestad	Aruba	ABW
Bahamas	Flag of The Bahamas	The Bahamas (Note: Since the Lucayan Archipelago is located in the Atlantic Ocean rather than the Caribbean Sea, the Bahamas are part of the West Indies but are not technically part of the Caribbean, although the United Nations groups them with the Caribbean.)	13,943 km^{2} (5,383 sq mi)	407,906	24.5/km^{2} (63/sq mi)	Nassau	Bahamas	BHS
Barbados	Flag of Barbados	Barbados	430 km^{2} (170 sq mi)	281,200	595.3/km^{2} (1,542/sq mi)	Bridgetown	Barbados	BRB
Belize	Flag of Belize	Belize	22,966 km^{2} (8,867 sq mi)	400,031	13.4/km^{2} (35/sq mi)	Belmopan	Belize	BLZ
Bermuda	Flag of Bermuda	Bermuda (United Kingdom)	54 km^{2} (21 sq mi)	64,185	1,203.7/km^{2} (3,118/sq mi)	Hamilton	Bermuda	BMU
Bonaire	Flag of Bonaire	Bonaire (Kingdom of the Netherlands)	294 km^{2} (114 sq mi)	12,093	41.1/km^{2} (106/sq mi)	Kralendijk	Boneiru	BES
British Virgin Islands	Flag of the British Virgin Islands	British Virgin Islands (United Kingdom)	151 km^{2} (58 sq mi)	31,122	152.3/km^{2} (394/sq mi)	Road Town	British Virgin Islands	VGB
Canada	Flag of Canada	Canada	9,984,670 km^{2} (3,855,100 sq mi)	38,155,012	3.7/km^{2} (9.6/sq mi)	Ottawa	Canada	CAN
Cayman Islands	Flag of the Cayman Islands	Cayman Islands (United Kingdom)	264 km^{2} (102 sq mi)	68,136	212.1/km^{2} (549/sq mi)	George Town	Cayman Islands	CYM
France	Flag of France	Clipperton Island (France)	6 km^{2} (2.3 sq mi)	0	0/km^{2} (0/sq mi)	—	Île de Clipperton	CPT
Costa Rica	Flag of Costa Rica	Costa Rica	51,180 km^{2} (19,760 sq mi)	5,153,957	89.6/km^{2} (232/sq mi)	San José	Costa Rica	CRI
Cuba	Flag of Cuba	Cuba	109,886 km^{2} (42,427 sq mi)	11,256,372	102.0/km^{2} (264/sq mi)	Havana	Cuba	CUB
Curaçao	Flag of Curaçao	Curaçao (Kingdom of the Netherlands)	444 km^{2} (171 sq mi)	190,338	317.1/km^{2} (821/sq mi)	Willemstad	Curaçao (Dutch); Kòrsou (Papiamento)	CUW
Dominica	Flag of Dominica	Dominica	751 km^{2} (290 sq mi)	72,412	89.2/km^{2} (231/sq mi)	Roseau	Dominica	DMA
Dominican Republic	Flag of the Dominican Republic	Dominican Republic	48,671 km^{2} (18,792 sq mi)	11,117,873	207.3/km^{2} (537/sq mi)	Santo Domingo	República Dominicana	DOM
El Salvador	Flag of El Salvador	El Salvador	21,041 km^{2} (8,124 sq mi)	6,314,167	293.0/km^{2} (759/sq mi)	San Salvador	El Salvador	SLV
Venezuela	Flag of Federal Dependencies of Venezuela	Federal Dependencies of Venezuela (Venezuela)	342 km^{2} (132 sq mi)	2,155	6.3/km^{2} (16/sq mi)	Gran Roque	Dependencias Federales de Venezuela	VEN-W
Greenland	Flag of Greenland	Greenland (Kingdom of Denmark)	2,166,086 km^{2} (836,330 sq mi)	56,243	0.026/km^{2} (0.067/sq mi)	Nuuk	Kalaallit Nunaat (Greenlandic); Grønland (Danish)	GRL
Grenada	Flag of Grenada	Grenada	344 km^{2} (133 sq mi)	124,610	302.3/km^{2} (783/sq mi)	St. George's	Gwenad	GRD
	Flag of Guadeloupe	Guadeloupe (France)	1,628 km^{2} (629 sq mi)	396,051	246.7/km^{2} (639/sq mi)	Basse-Terre	Gwadloup	GLP
	Flag of Guatemala	Guatemala	108,889 km^{2} (42,042 sq mi)	17,608,483	128.8/km^{2} (334/sq mi)	Guatemala City	Guatemala	GTM
	Flag of Haiti	Haiti	27,750 km^{2} (10,710 sq mi)	11,447,569	361.5/km^{2} (936/sq mi)	Port-au-Prince	Ayiti/Haïti	HTI
Honduras	Flag of Honduras	Honduras	112,492 km^{2} (43,433 sq mi)	10,278,345	66.4/km^{2} (172/sq mi)	Tegucigalpa	Honduras	HND
Jamaica	Flag of Jamaica	Jamaica	10,991 km^{2} (4,244 sq mi)	2,827,695	247.4/km^{2} (641/sq mi)	Kingston	Jumieka	JAM
	Flag of Martinique	Martinique (France)	1,128 km^{2} (436 sq mi)	368,796	352.6/km^{2} (913/sq mi)	Fort-de-France	Martinique (French); Matinik (Martinican Creole)	MTQ
	Flag of Mexico	Mexico	1,964,375 km^{2} (758,449 sq mi)	126,705,138	57.1/km^{2} (148/sq mi)	Mexico City	México	MEX
Montserrat	Flag of Montserrat	Montserrat (United Kingdom)	102 km^{2} (39 sq mi)	4,417	58.8/km^{2} (152/sq mi)	Plymouth, Brades (Note: Because of ongoing activity of the Soufriere Hills volcano beginning in July 1995, much of Plymouth was destroyed, and government offices were relocated to Brades. Plymouth remains the de jure capital.)	Montserrat	MSR
Nicaragua	Flag of Nicaragua	Nicaragua	130,373 km^{2} (50,337 sq mi)	6,850,540	44.1/km^{2} (114/sq mi)	Managua	Nicaragua	NIC
	Flag of Nueva Esparta	Nueva Esparta (Venezuela)	1,151 km^{2} (444 sq mi)	491,610	427.1/km^{2} (1,106/sq mi)	La Asunción	Nueva Esparta	VEN-O
Panama	Flag of Panama	Panama (Note: Panama is generally considered a North American country, though some authorities divide it at the Panama Canal. Figures listed here are for the entire country.)	75,417 km^{2} (29,119 sq mi)	4,351,267	45.8/km^{2} (119/sq mi)	Panama City	Panamá	PAN
Puerto Rico	Flag of Puerto Rico	Puerto Rico (United States)	8,870 km^{2} (3,420 sq mi)	3,256,028	448.9/km^{2} (1,163/sq mi)	San Juan	Puerto Rico	PRI
Saba (island)	Flag of Saba (island)	Saba (Kingdom of the Netherlands)	13 km^{2} (5 sq mi)	1,537	118.2/km^{2} (306/sq mi)	The Bottom	Saba	BES
	Flag of Archipelago of San Andrés, Providencia and Santa Catalina	San Andrés and Providencia (Colombia)	53 km^{2} (20 sq mi)	77,701	1,468.59/km^{2} (3,803.6/sq mi)	San Andrés	San Andrés	COL-SAP
Saint Barthélemy	Flag of Saint Barthélemy	Saint Barthélemy (France)	21 km^{2} (8.1 sq mi)	7,448	354.7/km^{2} (919/sq mi)	Gustavia	Saint-Barthélemy	BLM
Saint Kitts and Nevis	Flag of Saint Kitts and Nevis	Saint Kitts and Nevis	261 km^{2} (101 sq mi)	47,606	199.2/km^{2} (516/sq mi)	Basseterre	Saint Kitts and Nevis	KNA
Saint Lucia	Flag of Saint Lucia	Saint Lucia	539 km^{2} (208 sq mi)	179,651	319.1/km^{2} (826/sq mi)	Castries	Sainte-Lucie	LCA
Collectivity of Saint Martin	Flag of Collectivity of Saint Martin	Saint Martin (France)	54 km^{2} (21 sq mi)	29,820	552.2/km^{2} (1,430/sq mi)	Marigot	Saint-Martin	MAF
Saint Pierre and Miquelon	Flag of Saint Pierre and Miquelon	Saint Pierre and Miquelon (France)	242 km^{2} (93 sq mi)	5,883	24.8/km^{2} (64/sq mi)	Saint-Pierre	Saint-Pierre-et-Miquelon	SPM
Saint Vincent and the Grenadines	Flag of Saint Vincent and the Grenadines	Saint Vincent and the Grenadines	389 km^{2} (150 sq mi)	104,332	280.2/km^{2} (726/sq mi)	Kingstown	Saint Vincent and the Grenadines	VCT
Sint Eustatius	Flag of Sint Eustatius	Sint Eustatius (Kingdom of the Netherlands)	21 km^{2} (8.1 sq mi)	2,739	130.4/km^{2} (338/sq mi)	Oranjestad	Sint Eustatius	BES
Sint Maarten	Flag of Sint Maarten	Sint Maarten (Kingdom of the Netherlands)	34 km^{2} (13 sq mi)	44,042	1,176.7/km^{2} (3,048/sq mi)	Philipsburg	Sint Maarten	SXM
Trinidad and Tobago	Flag of Trinidad and Tobago	Trinidad and Tobago	5,130 km^{2} (1,980 sq mi)	1,525,663	261.0/km^{2} (676/sq mi)	Port of Spain	Trinidad and Tobago	TTO
	Flag of the Turks and Caicos Islands	Turks and Caicos Islands (United Kingdom) (Note: Since the Lucayan Archipelago is located in the Atlantic Ocean rather than the Caribbean Sea, the Turks and Caicos Islands are part of the West Indies but are not technically part of the Caribbean, although the United Nations groups them with the Caribbean.)	948 km^{2} (366 sq mi)	45,114	34.8/km^{2} (90/sq mi)	Grand Turk (Cockburn Town)	Turks and Caicos Islands	TCA
United States	Flag of the United States	United States (Note: Includes the states of Hawaii and Alaska, which are both separated from the US mainland, with Hawaii distant from the North American landmass in the Pacific Ocean and therefore more commonly associated with the other territories of Oceania, while Alaska is located between Asia (Russia) and Canada.)	9,629,091 km^{2} (3,717,813 sq mi)	336,997,624	32.7/km^{2} (85/sq mi)	Washington, D.C.	United States of America	USA
	Flag of the United States Virgin Islands	United States Virgin Islands (United States)	347 km^{2} (134 sq mi)	100,091	317.0/km^{2} (821/sq mi)	Charlotte Amalie	U.S. Virgin Islands	VIR
Total			24,500,995 km^{2} (9,459,887 sq mi)	583,473,912	22.1/km^{2} (57/sq mi)			

== Economy ==
Rank	Country or territory	GDP (nominal, peak year) millions of USD	GDP (PPP, peak year) millions of USD
1	United States	32,642,373	32,642,373
2	Mexico	2,176,236	3,594,397
3	Canada	2,490,256	2,915,715
4	Cuba (2021, 2015)	545,218	254,865
5	Dominican Republic	145,362	357,746
6	Guatemala	132,270	305,119

North America's GDP per capita was evaluated in October 2016 by the International Monetary Fund (IMF) to be $41,830, making it the richest continent in the world, followed by Oceania.

The U.S. has the largest economy in the world. In 2016, the U.S. had an estimated per capita gross domestic product (PPP) of $57,466 according to the World Bank, and is the most technologically developed economy of the three. The U.S.'s services sector comprises 77% of the country's GDP (estimated in 2010), industry comprises 22%, and agriculture comprises 1.2%. The U.S. economy is also the fastest-growing economy in North America and the Americas as a whole, with the highest GDP per capita in the Americas as well.

Canada shows significant growth in the sectors of services, mining, and manufacturing. Canada's per capita GDP (PPP) was estimated at $44,656, and it had the 11th-largest GDP (nominal) in 2014. Canada's services sector comprises 78% of the country's GDP (estimated in 2010), industry comprises 20%, and agriculture comprises 2%. Mexico has a per capita GDP (PPP) of $16,111; as of 2014, it is the 15th-largest GDP (nominal) in the world. Being a newly industrialized country, Mexico maintains both modern and outdated industrial and agricultural facilities and operations. Its main sources of income are oil, industrial exports, manufactured goods, electronics, heavy industry, automobiles, construction, food, banking, and financial services.

The North American economy is well defined and structured in three main economic areas. These areas are those under the North American Free Trade Agreement (NAFTA), the Caribbean Community and Common Market (CARICOM), and the Central American Common Market (CACM). Of these trade blocs, the U.S. takes part in two. In addition to the larger trade blocs, there is the Canada-Costa Rica Free Trade Agreement among numerous other free-trade relations, often between the larger, more developed countries and Central American and Caribbean countries.

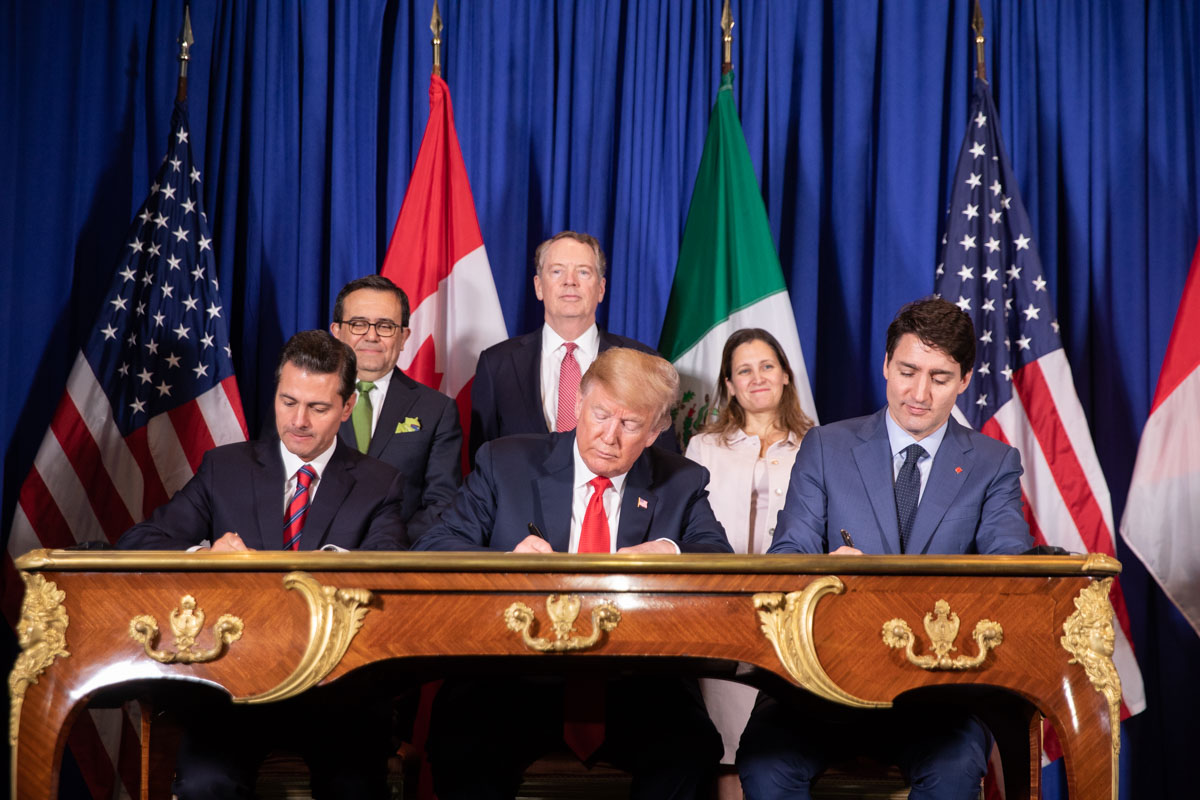
Mexican President Enrique Peña Nieto, U.S. President Donald Trump, and Canadian Prime Minister Justin Trudeau sign the U.S.–Mexico–Canada Agreement during the 2018 G20 Buenos Aires summit

NAFTA formed one of the four largest trade blocs in the world. Its implementation in 1994 was designed for economic homogenization with hopes of eliminating barriers to trade and foreign investment between Canada, the U.S., and Mexico. While Canada and the U.S. already had the largest bilateral trade relationship—and to this day still do—in the world, and Canada–U.S. trade relations already allowed trade without national taxes and tariffs, NAFTA allowed Mexico to experience similar duty-free trade. The free-trade agreement allowed for the elimination of tariffs that had previously been in place on U.S.–Mexico trade. Trade volume has steadily increased annually, and in 2010, surface trade between the three NAFTA nations reached an all-time historical increase of 24.3% or US$791 billion. The NAFTA trade bloc GDP (PPP) is the world's largest, at US$17.617 trillion. This is in part attributed to the fact that the economy of the U.S. is the world's largest national economy; the country had a nominal GDP of approximately $14.7 trillion in 2010. The countries of NAFTA are also some of each other's largest trade partners. The U.S. is the largest trade partner of Canada and Mexico, while Canada and Mexico are each other's third-largest trade partners. In 2018, the NAFTA was replaced by the U.S.–Mexico–Canada Agreement (USMCA).

The Caribbean trade bloc (CARICOM) came into existence in 1973 when an agreement was signed by 15 Caribbean nations. As of 2000, CARICOM trade volume was US$96 billion. CARICOM also allowed for the creation of a common passport for associated nations. In the past decade, the trade bloc focused largely on free-trade agreements; under the CARICOM Office of Trade Negotiations, free-trade agreements have been signed into effect.

Integration of Central American economies occurred under the signing of the Central American Common Market agreement in 1961; this was the first attempt to engage the nations of this area into stronger financial cooperation. The 2006 implementation of the Central American Free Trade Agreement (CAFTA) left the future of the CACM unclear. The Central American Free Trade Agreement was signed by five Central American countries, the Dominican Republic, and the U.S. The focal point of CAFTA is to create a free trade area similar to that of NAFTA. In addition to the U.S., Canada also has relations with Central American trade blocs.

These nations also take part in intercontinental trade blocs. Mexico takes part in the G3 Free Trade Agreement with Colombia and Venezuela and has a trade agreement with the EU. The U.S. has proposed and maintained trade agreements under the Transatlantic Free Trade Area between itself and the European Union; the U.S.–Middle East Free Trade Area between numerous Middle Eastern nations and itself; and the Trans-Pacific Strategic Economic Partnership between Southeast Asian nations, Australia, and New Zealand.

=== Transport ===
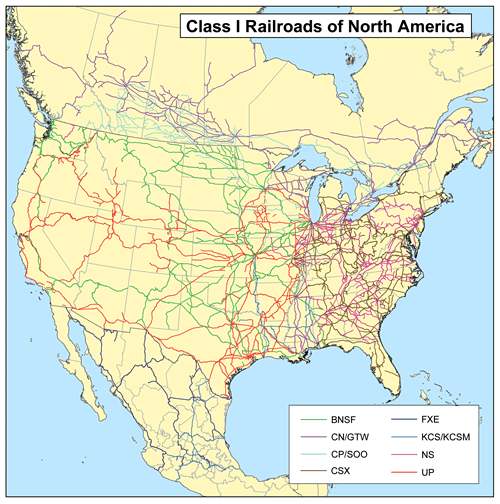
A 2006 map of the North American Class I railroad network

The Pan-American Highway route in the Americas is the portion of a network of roads nearly 48,000 km (30,000 mi) in length which travels through the mainland nations. No definitive length of the Pan-American Highway exists because the U.S. and Canadian governments have never officially defined any specific routes as being part of the Pan-American Highway, and Mexico officially has many branches connecting to the U.S. border. However, the total length of the portion from Mexico to the northern extremity of the highway is roughly 26,000 km (16,000 mi).

The first transcontinental railroad in the U.S. was built in the 1860s, linking the railroad network of the eastern U.S. with California on the Pacific coast. Finished on 10 May 1869 at the famous golden spike event at Promontory Summit, Utah, it created a nationwide mechanized transportation network that revolutionized the population and economy of the American western frontier, catalyzing the transition from the wagon trains of previous decades to a modern transportation system. Although an accomplishment, it achieved the status of the first transcontinental railroad by connecting myriad eastern U.S. railroads to the Pacific and was not the largest single railroad system in the world. The Canadian Grand Trunk Railway had, by 1867, already accumulated more than 2,055 km (1,277 mi) of track by connecting Ontario with the Canadian Atlantic provinces west as far as Port Huron, Michigan, through Sarnia, Ontario.

=== Communications ===
A shared telephone system known as the North American Numbering Plan is an integrated telephone numbering plan of 24 countries and territories: the U.S. and its territories, Canada, Bermuda, and 17 Caribbean nations.

== Demographics ==
Non-native nations' control and claims over North America, c. 1750 to 2008

Canada and the United States are the wealthiest and most developed nations on the continent, followed by Mexico, a newly industrialized country. The countries of Central America and the Caribbean are at various levels of economic and human development. For example, small Caribbean island-nations, such as Barbados, Trinidad and Tobago, and Antigua and Barbuda, have a higher GDP (PPP) per capita than Mexico due to their smaller populations. Panama and Costa Rica have a significantly higher Human Development Index and GDP than the rest of the Central American nations. Additionally, despite Greenland's vast resources in oil and minerals, much of them remain untapped, and the island is economically dependent on fishing, tourism, and subsidies from Denmark. Nevertheless, the island is highly developed.

Demographically, North America is ethnically diverse. Its three largest groups are Whites, Mestizos, and Blacks. There is a significant minority of Indigenous Americans and Asians among other less numerous groups.

=== Languages ===
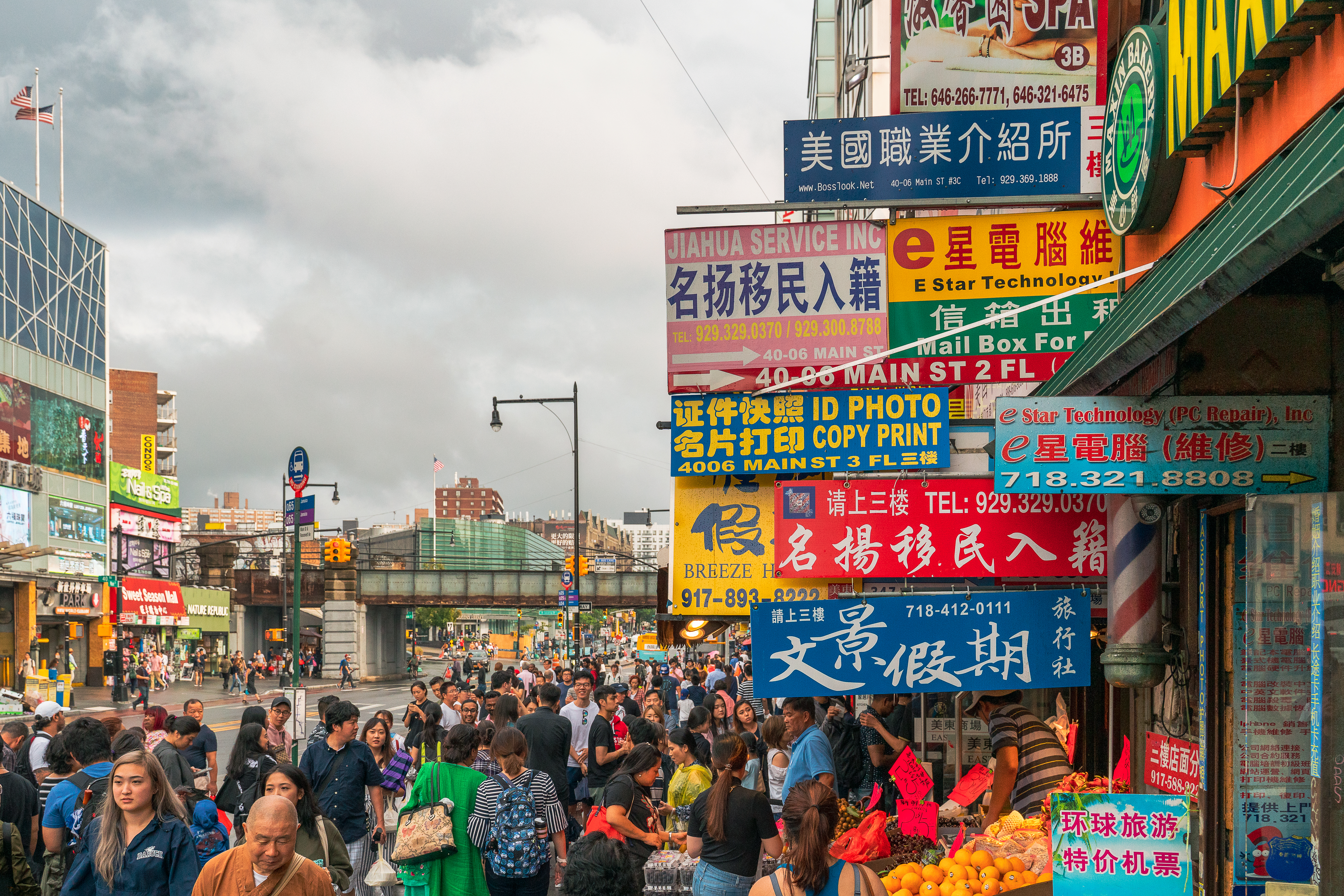
Chinatown, Flushing in Queens, New York City has become the present-day global epicenter receiving Chinese immigration as well as the international control center directing such migration, as numerous languages have become entrenched in North American society.

The dominant languages in North America are English, Spanish, and French. Danish is prevalent in Greenland alongside Greenlandic, and Dutch is spoken side by side with local languages in the Dutch Caribbean. The term Anglo-America is used to refer to the anglophone countries of the Americas: namely Canada (where English and French are co-official) and the U.S., but also sometimes Belize and parts of the tropics, especially the Commonwealth Caribbean. Latin America refers to the other areas of the Americas (generally south of the U.S.) where Spanish and Portuguese—both Romance languages, derived from Latin—predominate (though French-speaking countries are usually excluded): the other republics of Central America (but not always Belize), part of the Caribbean (not the Dutch-, English-, or French-speaking areas), Mexico, and most of South America (except Guyana, Suriname, French Guiana [France], and the Falkland Islands [UK]).

The U.S. has an ethnically diverse population, and 37 ancestry groups have more than one million members. The French language has historically played a significant role in North America and now retains a distinctive presence in some regions. Canada is officially bilingual. French is the official language of the province of Quebec, where 95% of the people speak it as either their first or second language, and it is co-official with English in the province of New Brunswick. Other French-speaking locales include the province of Ontario (the official language is English, but there are an estimated 600,000 Franco-Ontarians), the province of Manitoba (co-official as de jure with English), the French West Indies and Saint-Pierre et Miquelon, as well as the U.S. state of Louisiana, where French is also an official language. Haiti is included with this group based on historical association, but Haitians speak both Creole and French. Similarly, French and French Antillean Creole are spoken in Saint Lucia and the Commonwealth of Dominica alongside English.

=== Indigenous languages ===
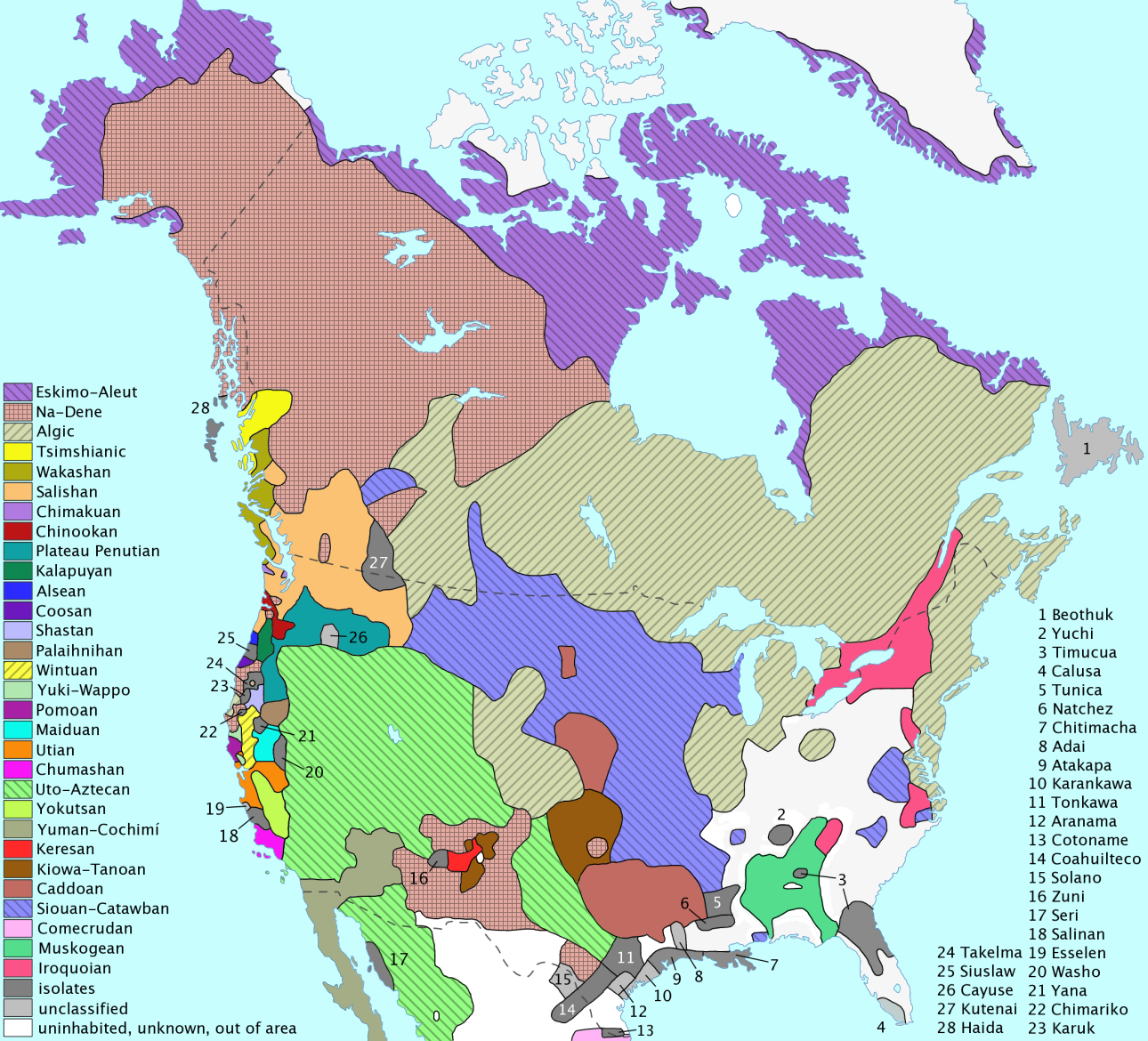
Native languages of the United States, Canada, Greenland, and Northern Mexico

A significant number of indigenous languages are spoken in North America, with roughly 6 million in Mexico speaking an indigenous language at home, 372,000 people in the U.S., and about 225,000 in Canada. In the U.S. and Canada, there are approximately 150 surviving indigenous languages of the 300 spoken prior to European contact.

=== Religions ===
The percentage of people who identify with a religion in North America, according to 2010–2012 data

Christianity is the largest religion in the United States, Canada, and Mexico. According to a 2012 Pew Research Center survey, 77% of the population considered themselves Christians. Christianity is also the predominant religion in the 23 dependent territories in North America. The U.S. has the largest Christian population in the world, with nearly 247 million Christians (70%), although other countries have higher percentages of Christians among their populations. Mexico has the world's second-largest number of Catholics, surpassed only by Brazil.

According to the same study, the religiously unaffiliated (including agnostics and atheists) make up about 17% of the population of Canada and the U.S. Those with no religious affiliation make up about 24% of Canada's total population.

Canada, the U.S., and Mexico host communities of Jews (6 million or about 1.8%), Buddhists (3.8 million or 1.1%), and Muslims (3.4 million or 1.0%). The largest number of Jews can be found in the U.S. (5.4 million), Canada (375,000), and Mexico (67,476). The U.S. hosts the largest Muslim population in North America with 2.7 million or 0.9%, while Canada hosts about one million Muslims or 3.2% of the population. In Mexico, there were 3,700 Muslims in 2010. In 2012, U-T San Diego estimated U.S. practitioners of Buddhism at 1.2 million people, of whom 40% are living in Southern California.

The predominant religion in Mexico and Central America is Christianity (96%). Beginning with the Spanish colonization of Mexico in the 16th century, Roman Catholicism was the only religion permitted by the Spanish crown and the Catholic church. A vast campaign of religious conversion, the so-called "spiritual conquest", was launched to bring the indigenous peoples into the Christian fold. The Inquisition was established to ensure orthodox belief and practice. The Catholic Church remained an important institution, so that even after political independence, Roman Catholicism remained the dominant religion. Since the 1960s, there has been an increase in other Christian groups, particularly Protestantism, as well as other religious organizations, and individuals identifying themselves as having no religion. Christianity is also the predominant religion in the Caribbean (85%). Other religious groups in the region are Hinduism, Islam, Rastafari (in Jamaica), and Afro-American religions such as Santería and Vodou.

=== Population ===
North American cities

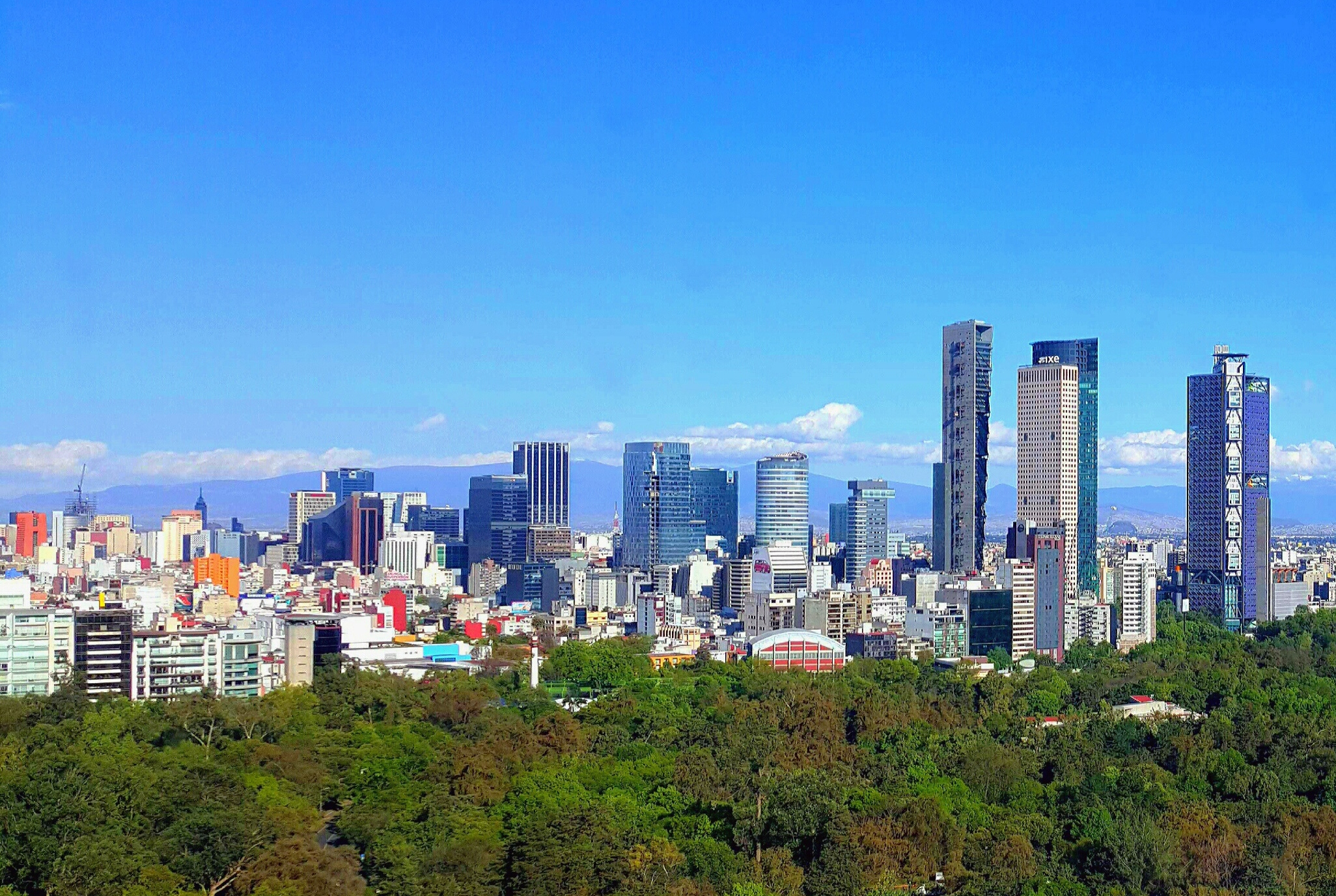
Mexico City

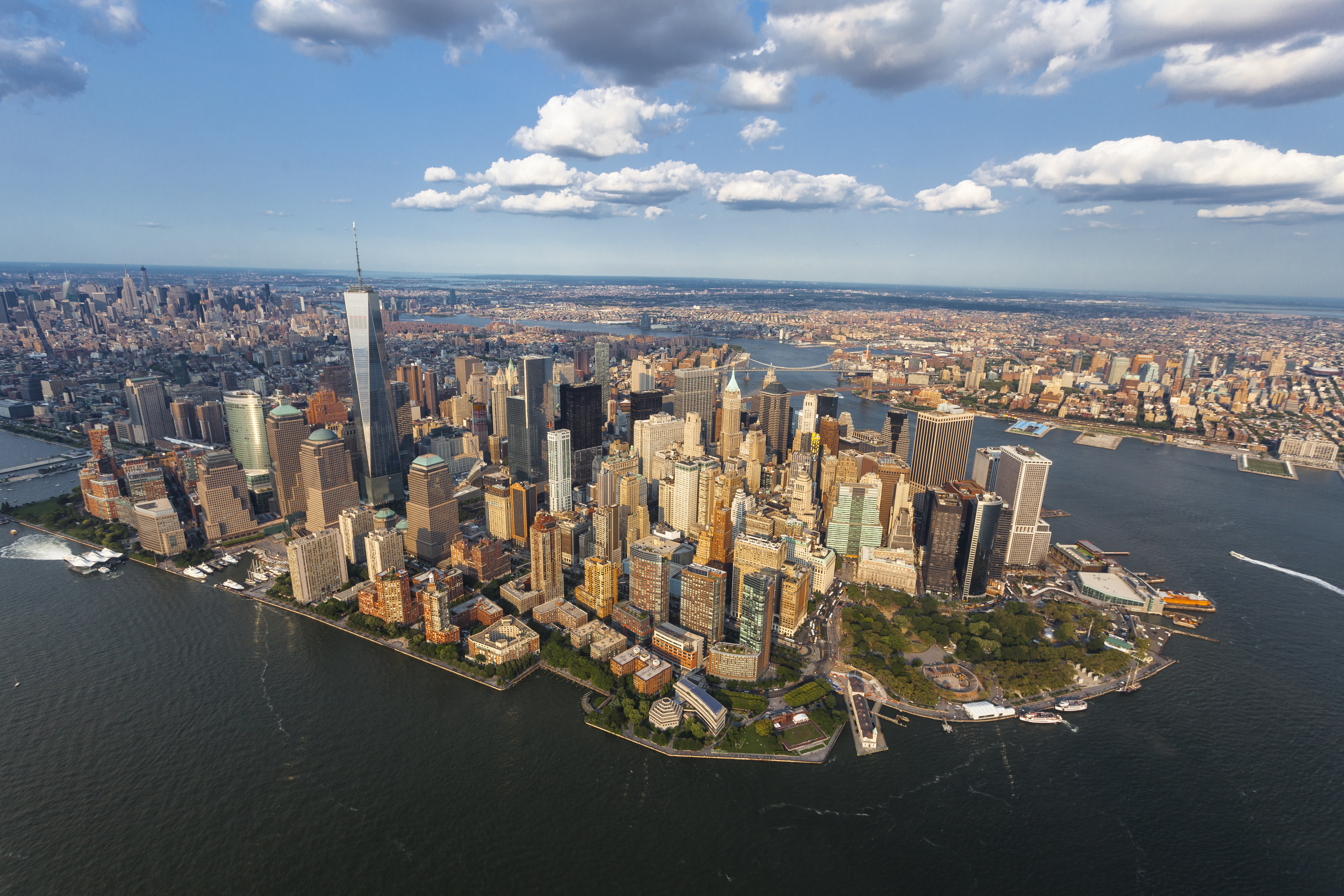
New York City

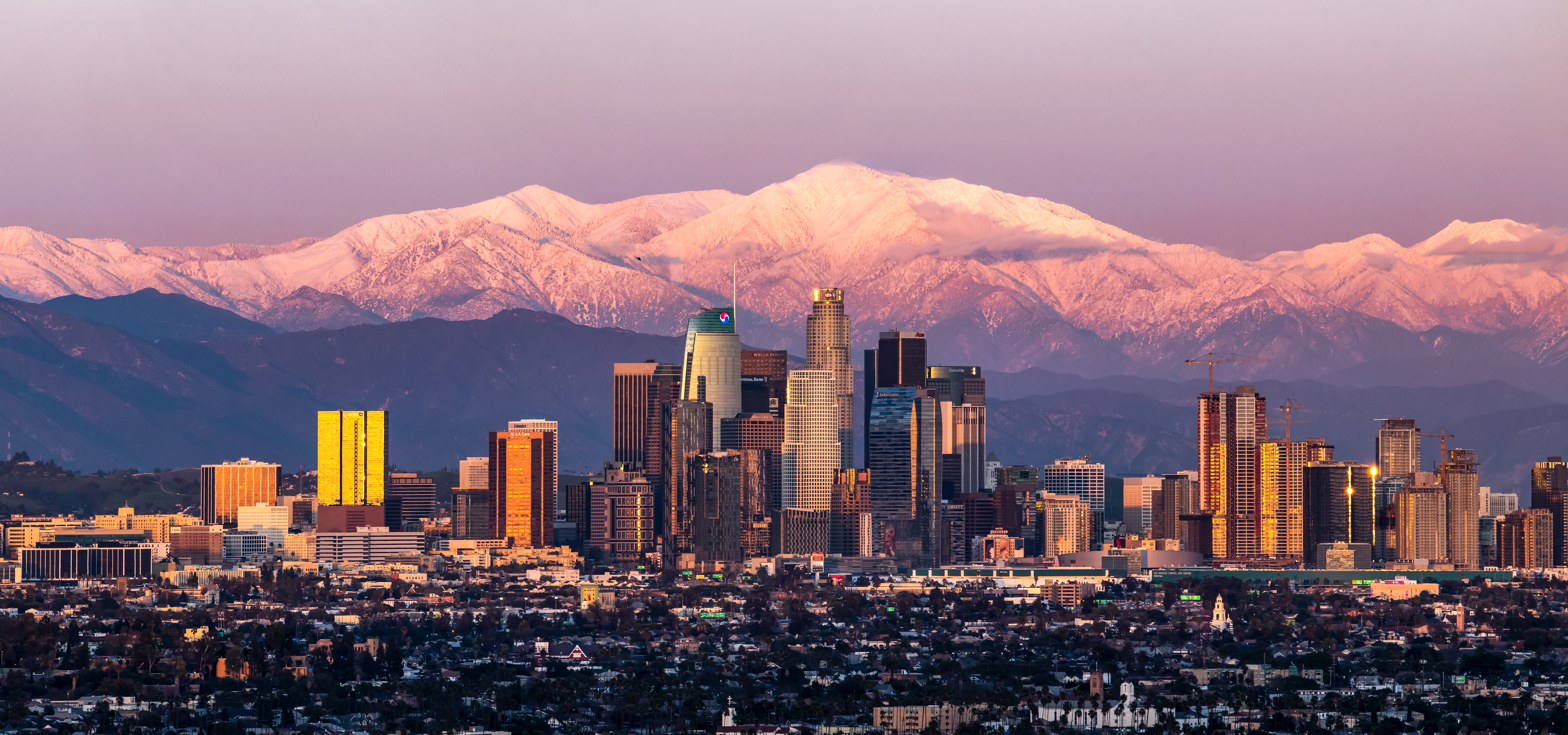
Los Angeles

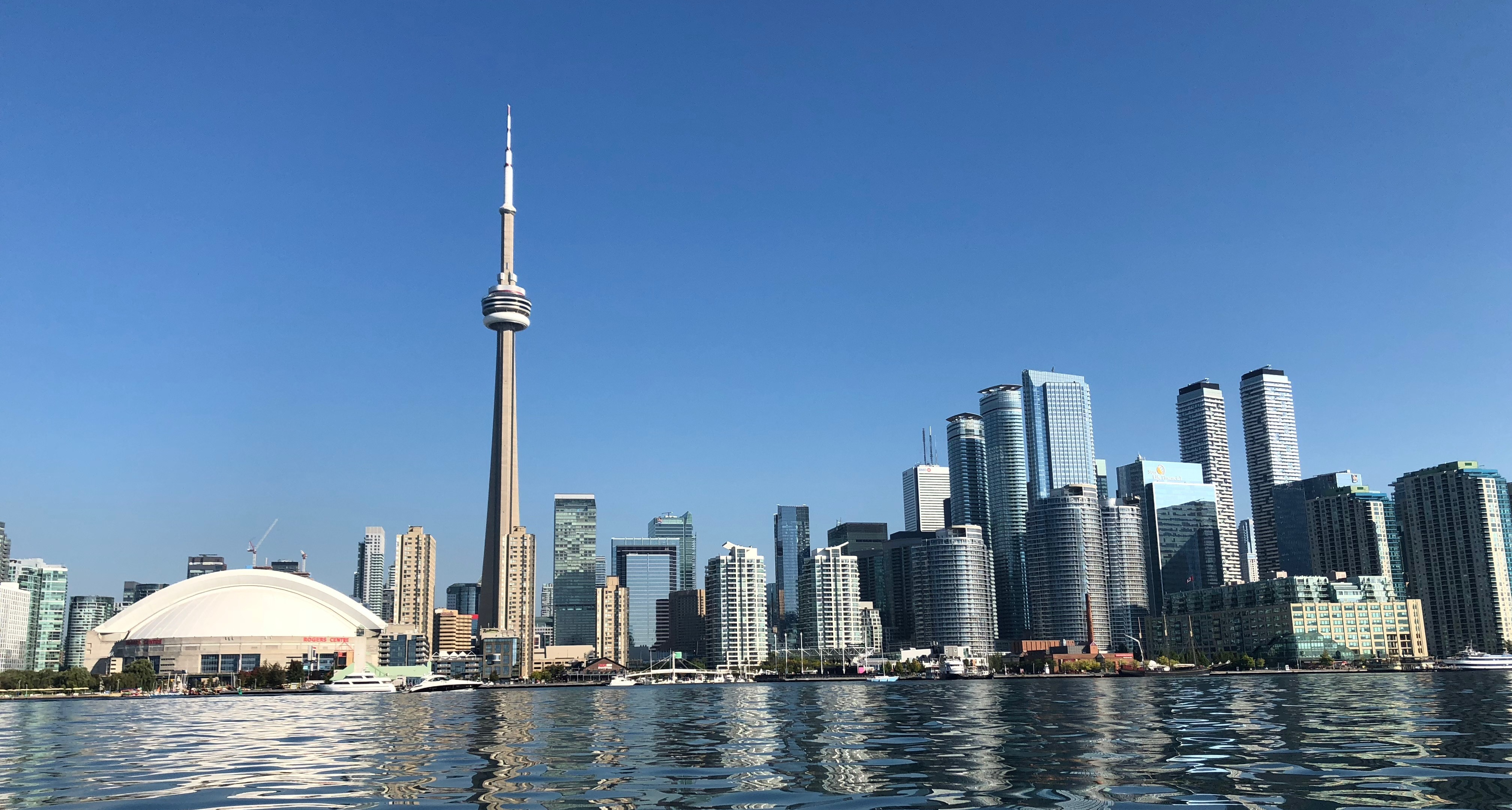
Toronto

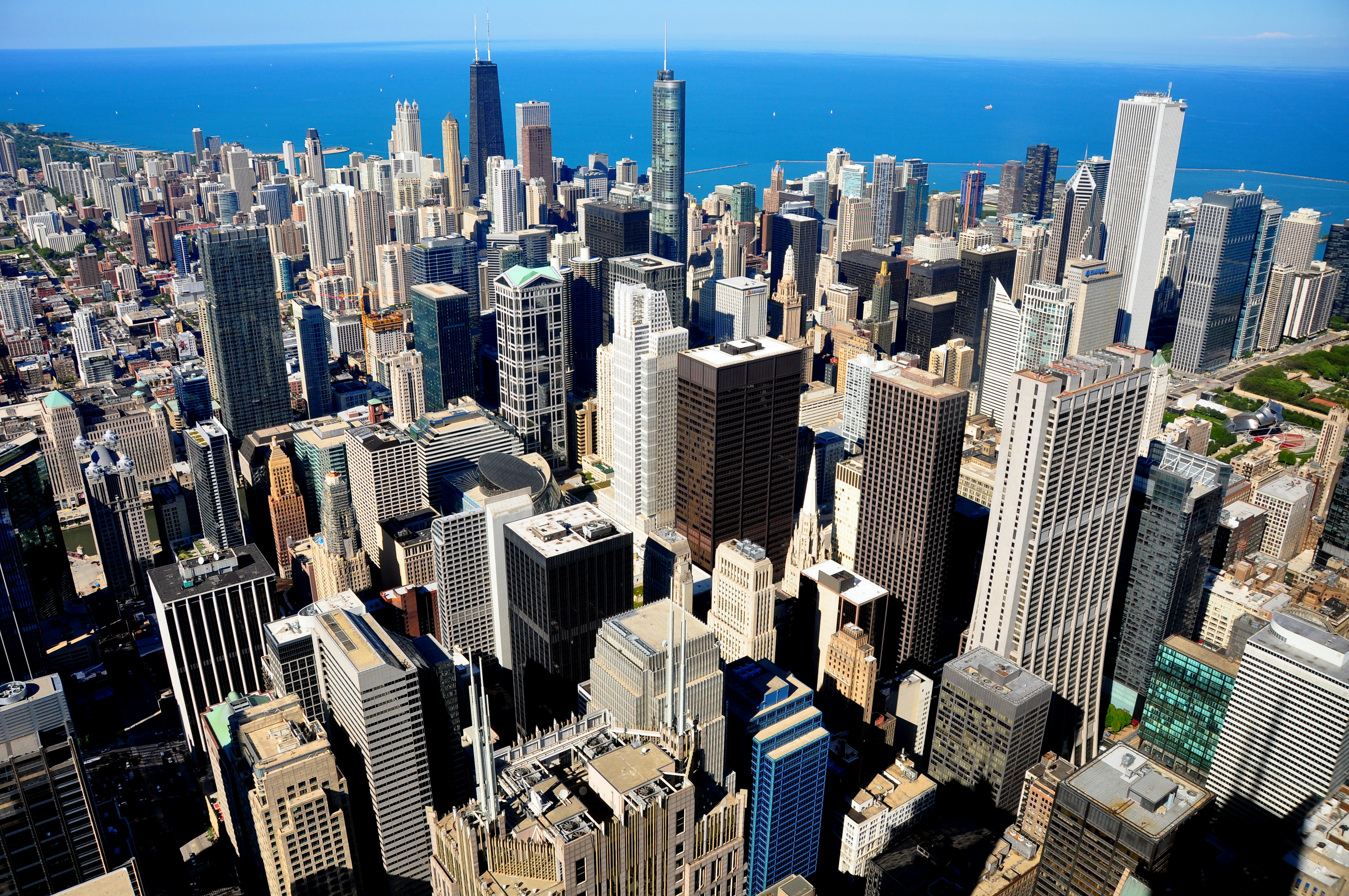
Chicago

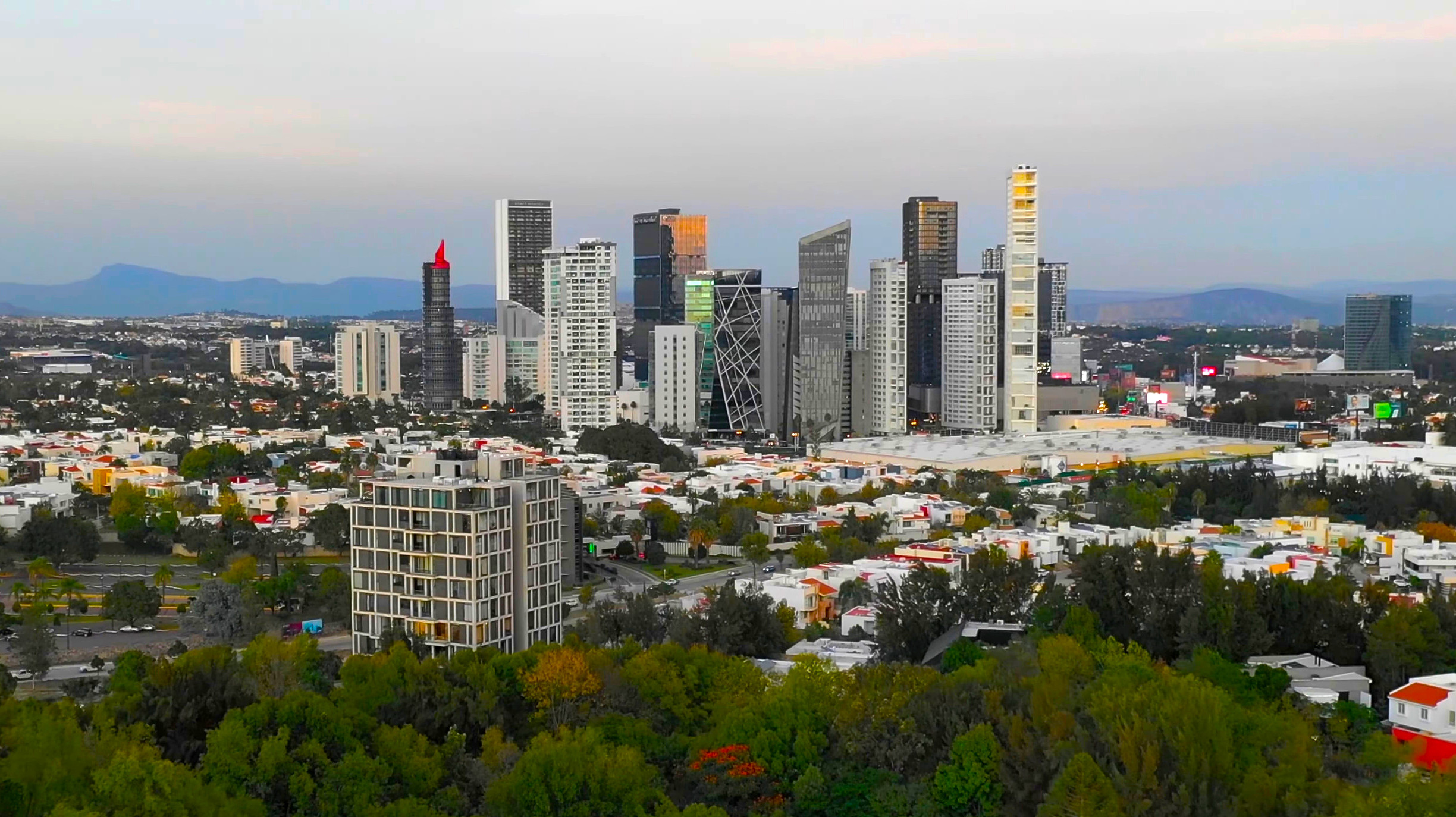
Guadalajara

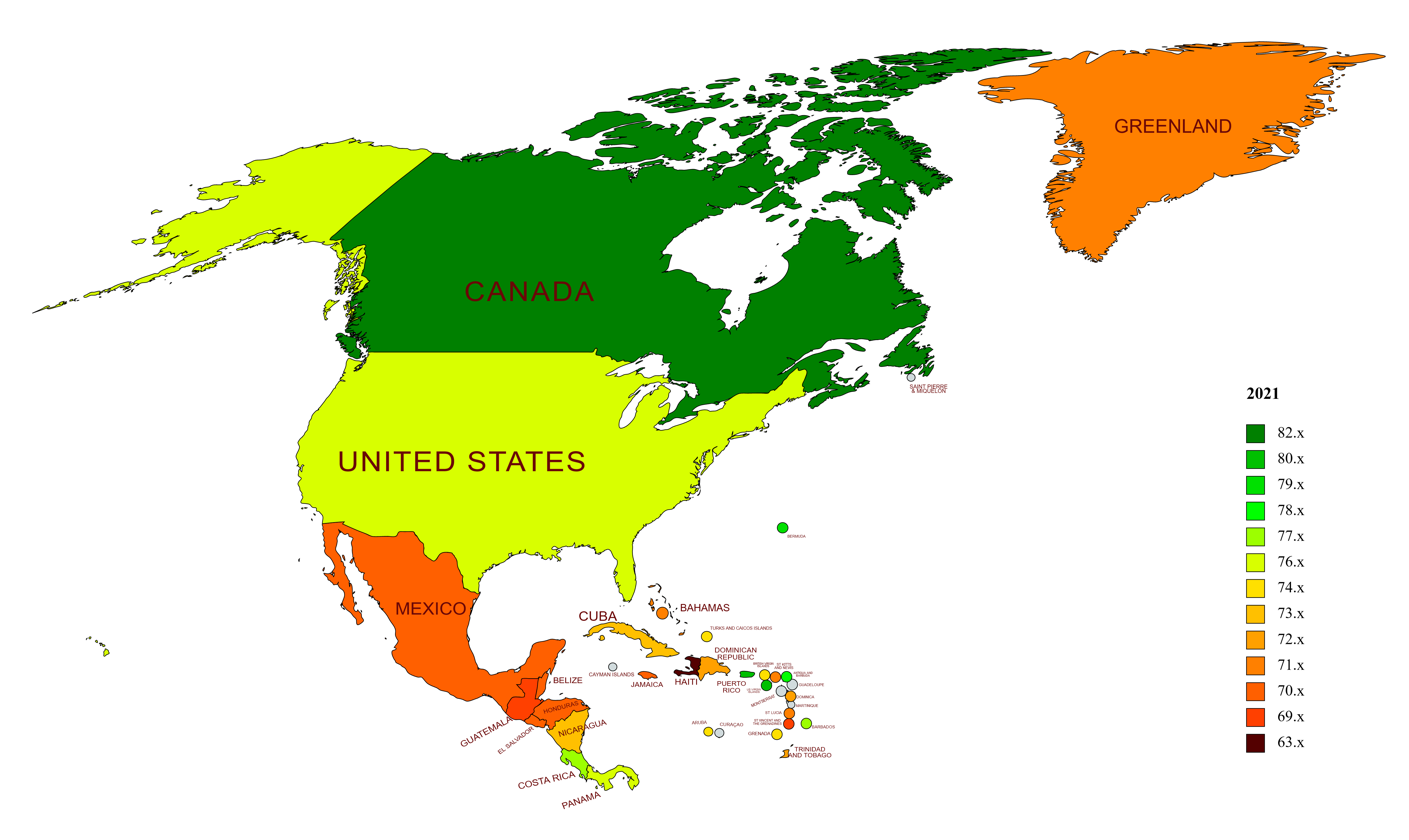
Life expectancy in North America in 2021

North America is the fourth most populous continent after Asia, Africa, and Europe. Its most populous country is the U.S. with 342.9 million persons. The second-largest country is Mexico, with a population of 126 million. Canada is the third-most-populous country with 41.5 million. The majority of Caribbean island-nations have national populations under a million, though Cuba, Dominican Republic, Haiti, Puerto Rico (a territory of the U.S.), Jamaica, and Trinidad and Tobago each have populations higher than a million. (Note: "Anuario Estadístico de Cuba 2009" (in Spanish) (2010 ed.). Oficina Nacional de Estadísticas, República de Cuba. Archived from the original on July 16, 2010. Note: An exchange rate of 1 CUC to US$1.08 was used to convert GDP.) Greenland has a small population of 55,984 for its massive size (2.166 million km^{2} or 836,300 mi^{2}), and therefore, it has the world's lowest population density at 0.026 pop./km^{2} (0.067 pop./mi^{2}).

While the U.S., Canada, and Mexico maintain the largest populations, large city populations are not restricted to those nations. There are also large cities in the Caribbean. The largest cities in North America, by far, are Mexico City and New York City. These cities are the only cities on the continent to exceed eight million, and two of three in the Americas. Next in size are Los Angeles, Toronto, Chicago, Havana, Santo Domingo, and Montreal. Cities in the Sun Belt regions of the U.S., such as those in Southern California and Houston, Phoenix, Miami, Atlanta, and Las Vegas, are experiencing rapid growth. These causes include warm temperatures, the retirement of Baby Boomers, large industries, and the influx of immigrants. Cities near the U.S. border, particularly in Mexico, are also experiencing large amounts of growth. Most notable is Tijuana, a city bordering San Diego that receives immigrants from all over Latin America and parts of Europe and Asia. Yet as cities grow in these warmer regions of North America, they are increasingly forced to deal with the major issue of water shortages.

Eight of the top ten metropolitan areas are located in the U.S. These metropolitan areas all have a population of above 5.5 million and include the New York City metropolitan area, Los Angeles metropolitan area, Chicago metropolitan area, and the Dallas–Fort Worth metroplex. While the majority of the largest metropolitan areas are within the U.S., Mexico is host to the largest metropolitan area by population in North America: Greater Mexico City. Canada also breaks into the top ten largest metropolitan areas, with the Toronto metropolitan area having six million people. The proximity of cities to each other on the Canada–United States border and the Mexico–U.S. border has led to the rise of international metropolitan areas. These urban agglomerations are observed at their largest and most productive in Detroit–Windsor and San Diego–Tijuana and experience large commercial, economic, and cultural activity. The metropolitan areas are responsible for millions of dollars of trade dependent on international freight. In Detroit-Windsor, the Border Transportation Partnership study in 2004 concluded US$13 billion was dependent on the Detroit–Windsor international border crossing, while in San Diego–Tijuana, freight at the Otay Mesa Port of Entry was valued at US$20 billion.

North America has also been witness to the growth of megapolitan areas. The United States includes eleven megaregions.

The top ten largest North American metropolitan areas by population as of 2013, based on national census numbers from the U.S. and census estimates from Canada and Mexico
Metro Area	Population	Area	Country
Mexico City	21,163,226^{†}	7,346 km^{2} (2,836 sq mi)	Mexico
New York City	19,949,502	17,405 km^{2} (6,720 sq mi)	United States
Los Angeles	13,131,431	12,562 km^{2} (4,850 sq mi)	United States
Chicago	9,537,289	24,814 km^{2} (9,581 sq mi)	United States
Dallas–Fort Worth	6,810,913	24,059 km^{2} (9,289 sq mi)	United States
Houston	6,313,158	26,061 km^{2} (10,062 sq mi)	United States
Toronto	6,054,191^{†}	5,906 km^{2} (2,280 sq mi)	Canada
Philadelphia	6,034,678	13,256 km^{2} (5,118 sq mi)	United States
Washington, D.C.	5,949,859	14,412 km^{2} (5,565 sq mi)	United States
Miami	5,828,191	15,896 km^{2} (6,137 sq mi)	United States

^{†}2011 Census figures

== Culture ==
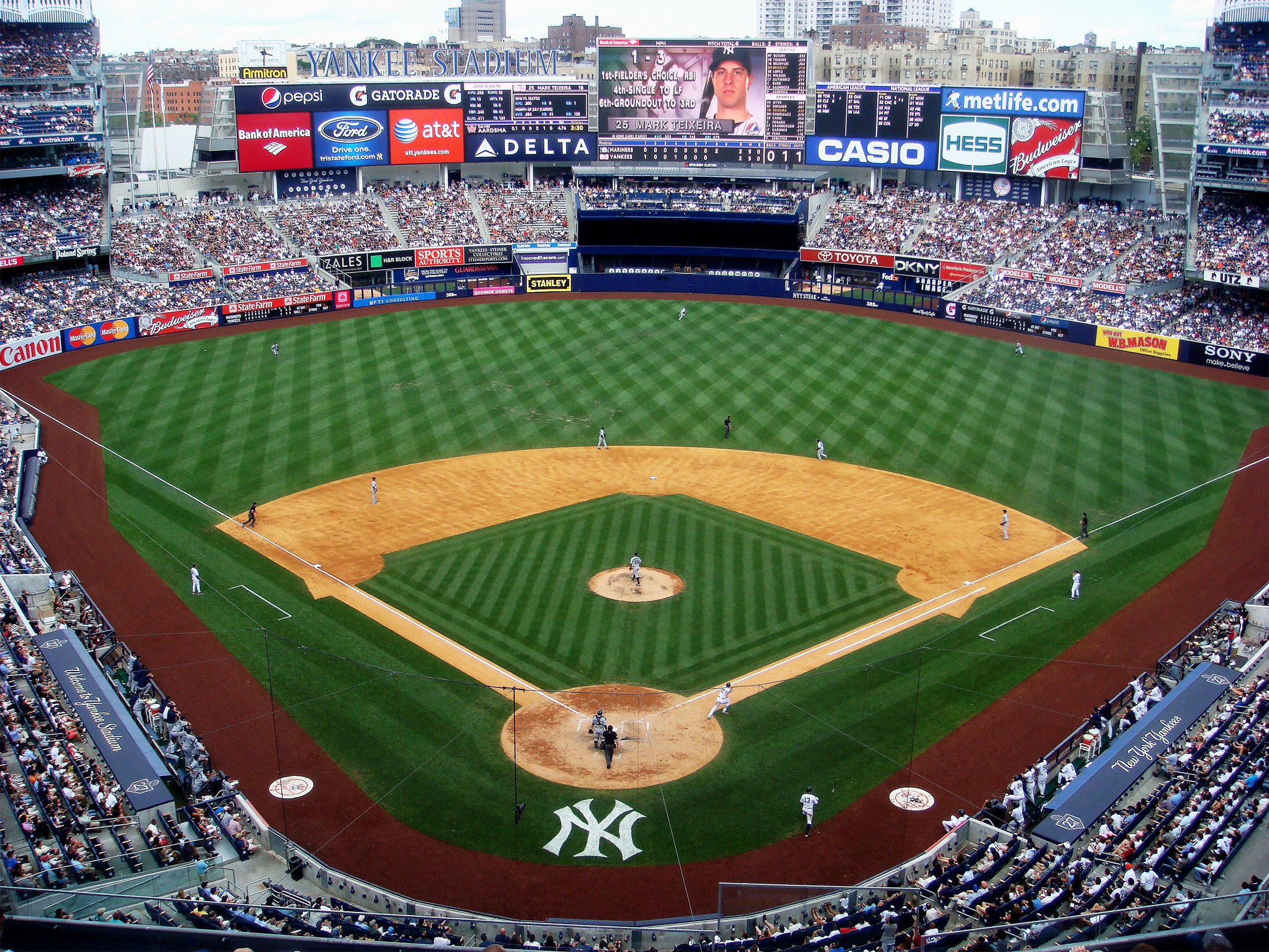
Baseball is known as the national pastime of the United States, and is also played in Canada and many Latin American countries.

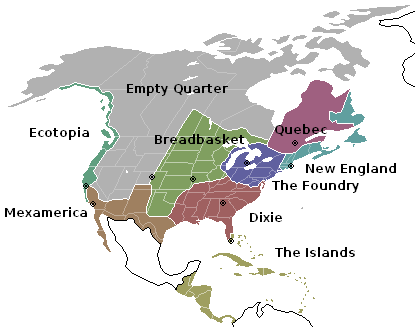
The Nine Nations of North America

The cultures of North America are diverse. The United States and English Canada have many cultural similarities, while French Canada has a distinct culture from Anglophone Canada that is protected by law. Since the United States was formed from portions previously part of the Spanish Empire and then independent Mexico, and since there has been considerable and continuing immigration of Spanish speakers from south of the U.S.–Mexico border, the Southwest of the U.S. exhibits significant Hispanic cultural elements and traditions and considerable bilingualism. Mexico and Central America are part of Latin America and are culturally distinct from anglophone and francophone North America. However, they share with the United States the establishment of post-independence governments that are federated representative republics with written constitutions dating from their founding as nations. Canada is a federated parliamentary democracy under a constitutional monarchy.

Canada's constitution dates to 1867, with confederation under the British North America Act, but not until 1982 did Canada have the power to amend its own constitution. Canada's Francophone heritage has been enshrined in law since the British Parliament passed the Quebec Act of 1774. In contrast to largely Protestant Anglo settlers in North America, French-speaking Canadians were Catholic. The Quebec Act guaranteed the freedom of Catholic Francophone Canadians to practice their religion, restored the right of the Catholic Church to impose tithes for its support, and established French civil law in most circumstances.

The distinctiveness of the French language and culture has been codified in Canadian law, so that both English and French are designated official languages. The U.S. has no official language, but its national language is English.

The Canadian government took action to protect Canadian culture by limiting non-Canadian content in broadcasting, creating the Canadian Radio-television and Telecommunications Commission to monitor Canadian content. In Quebec, the provincial government established the Quebec Office of the French Language, often called the "language police" by Anglophones, which mandates the use of French terminology and signage in French. Since 1968, the unicameral legislature has been called the Quebec National Assembly. Saint-Jean-Baptiste Day, 24 June, is the national holiday of Quebec and is celebrated by francophone Canadians throughout Canada. In Quebec, the school system was divided into Catholic and Protestant, so-called confessional schools. Anglophone education in Quebec has been increasingly undermined.

Latino culture is strong in the southwestern United States, as well as in the New York metropolitan area and Florida, which draw Latin Americans from many countries in the Western Hemisphere. Northern Mexico, particularly in the cities of Monterrey, Tijuana, Ciudad Juárez, and Mexicali, is strongly influenced by the culture and way of life of the U.S. Monterrey, a modern city with a significant industrial group, has been regarded as the most Americanized city in Mexico.

The Anglophone Caribbean states have witnessed and participated in the decline of the British Empire and its influence on the region, as well as the increase in the economic influence of Northern America over the Anglophone Caribbean. This is partly due to the relatively small populations of the English-speaking Caribbean countries, and also because many of them now have more people living abroad than those remaining at home.

Greenland has experienced many immigration waves from Northern Canada, e.g., by the Thule people. Therefore, Greenland shares some cultural ties with the indigenous peoples of Canada. Greenland is also considered Nordic and has strong Danish ties due to centuries of colonization by Denmark.

=== Sport ===
The United States and Canada have major sports teams that compete against each other, including baseball, basketball, hockey, and soccer/football. Canada, Mexico, and the United States jointly hosted the 2026 FIFA World Cup.

The Native American game of lacrosse is considered a national sport in Canada. Curling is an important winter sport in Canada, and the Winter Olympics include it in the roster. The English sport of cricket is popular in parts of anglophone Canada and very popular in parts of the former British Empire, but in Canada is considered a minor sport. Boxing is also a major sport in some countries, such as Mexico, Panama and Puerto Rico, and it is considered one of the main individual sports in the United States. Canada has a separate Canadian Football League from the U.S. teams.

The following table shows the most prominent sports leagues in North America, in order of average revenue.

League	Sport	Primary country	Founded	Teams	Revenue US$ (bn)	Average attendance
National Football League (NFL)	American football	United States	1920	32	$9.0	67,604
Major League Baseball (MLB)	Baseball	United States; Canada	1869	30	$8.0	30,458
National Basketball Association (NBA)	Basketball	United States; Canada	1946	30	$5.0	17,347
National Hockey League (NHL)	Ice hockey	United States; Canada	1917	32	$3.3	17,720
Liga MX	Football (soccer)	Mexico	1943	18	$0.6	25,557
Major League Soccer (MLS)	Football (soccer)	United States; Canada	1994	28	$0.5	21,574
Canadian Football League (CFL)	Canadian football	Canada	1958	9	$0.3	23,890

== See also ==
- Flags of North America
- List of cities in North America
- North American Union – Theoretical Canada-Mexico-US union
- Table manners in North America – Etiquette and practices in North America
