= Grand Wash Cliffs Wilderness =

Protected area in Mohave County, Arizona

- IUCN category Ib (wilderness area)
- Location within the United States
- Location: Grand Canyon-Parashant National Monument, Mohave County, Arizona, US
- Nearest city: Mesquite, NV
- Coordinates: 36°25′43″N 113°14′48″W
- Area: 37,030 acres (150 km^{2})
- Established: 1984
- Governing body: U.S. Department of Interior Bureau of Land Management

Grand Wash Cliffs Wilderness is a protected wilderness area in the Grand Canyon-Parashant National Monument in the U.S. state of Arizona. Established in 1984 under the Arizona Wilderness Act the area is managed by the Bureau of Land Management. This desert wilderness is a 12-mile stretch of the Grand Wash Cliffs encompassing escarpments, canyons, and sandstone buttes that make up the transition zone between the Colorado Plateau and the Basin and Range Province.

The elevation ranges from 2,650 feet (807 m) to 6,700 feet (2042 m). Vegetation includes an assortment of Mojave Desert shrubs below the cliffs as well as a pinyon-juniper woodland above. Wildlife in the area include gila monsters, desert tortoise, and desert bighorn sheep.

== See also ==
- List of Arizona Wilderness Areas
- List of U.S. Wilderness Areas
