= Mount Trumbull Wilderness =

Protected area in Mohave County, Arizona

- IUCN category Ib (wilderness area)
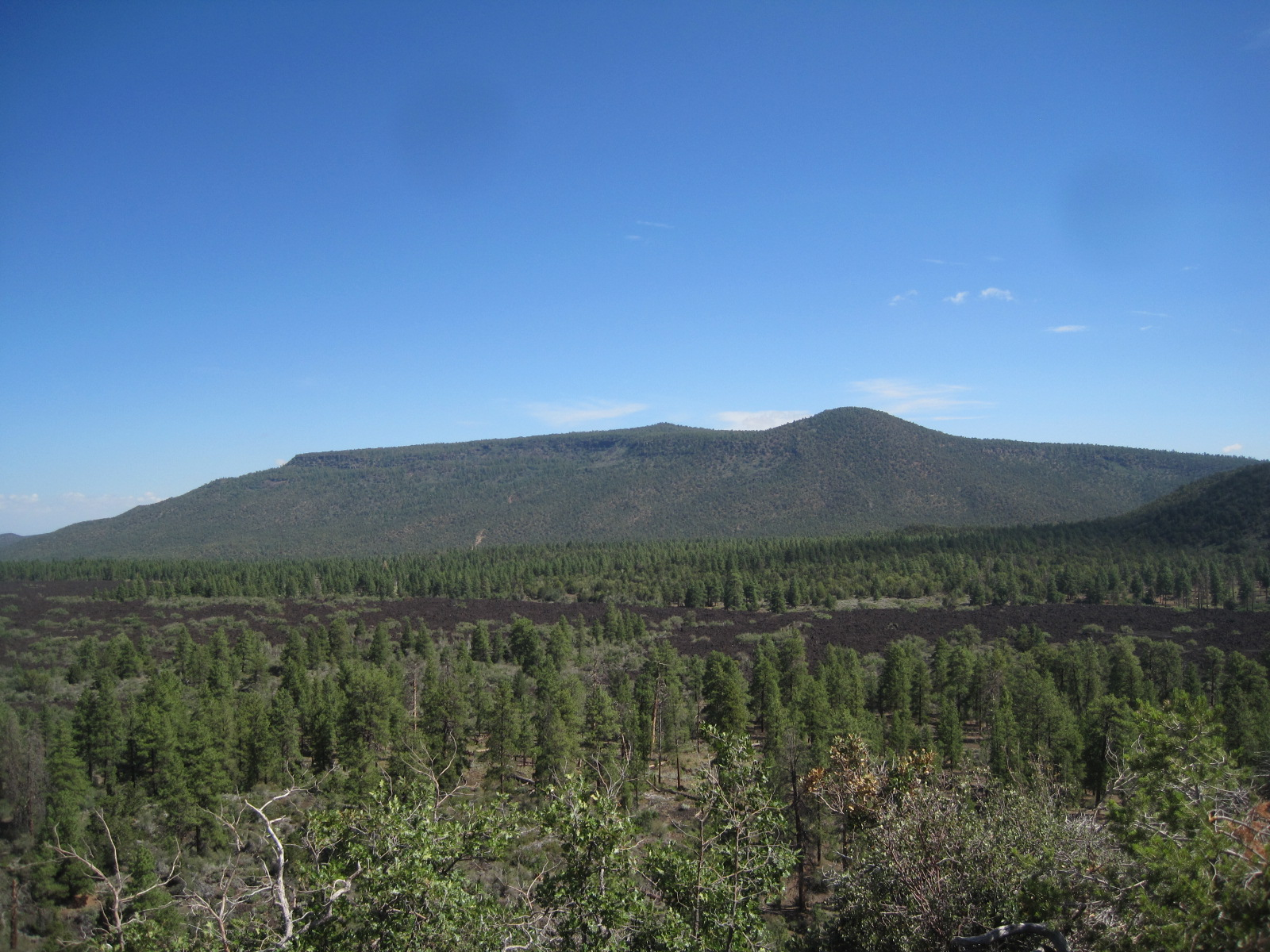
- A view of Mt. Trumbull from a nearby cinder cone
- Location: Mohave County, Arizona, United States
- Nearest city: Fredonia, Arizona
- Coordinates: 36°24′29″N 113°07′41″W
- Area: 7,880 acres (3,190 ha)
- Established: 1984
- Governing body: Bureau of Land Management

The Mount Trumbull Wilderness is a 7,880 acre (31 km^{2}) wilderness area located on the Uinkaret Plateau in the Arizona Strip. It is managed by the Bureau of Land Management.

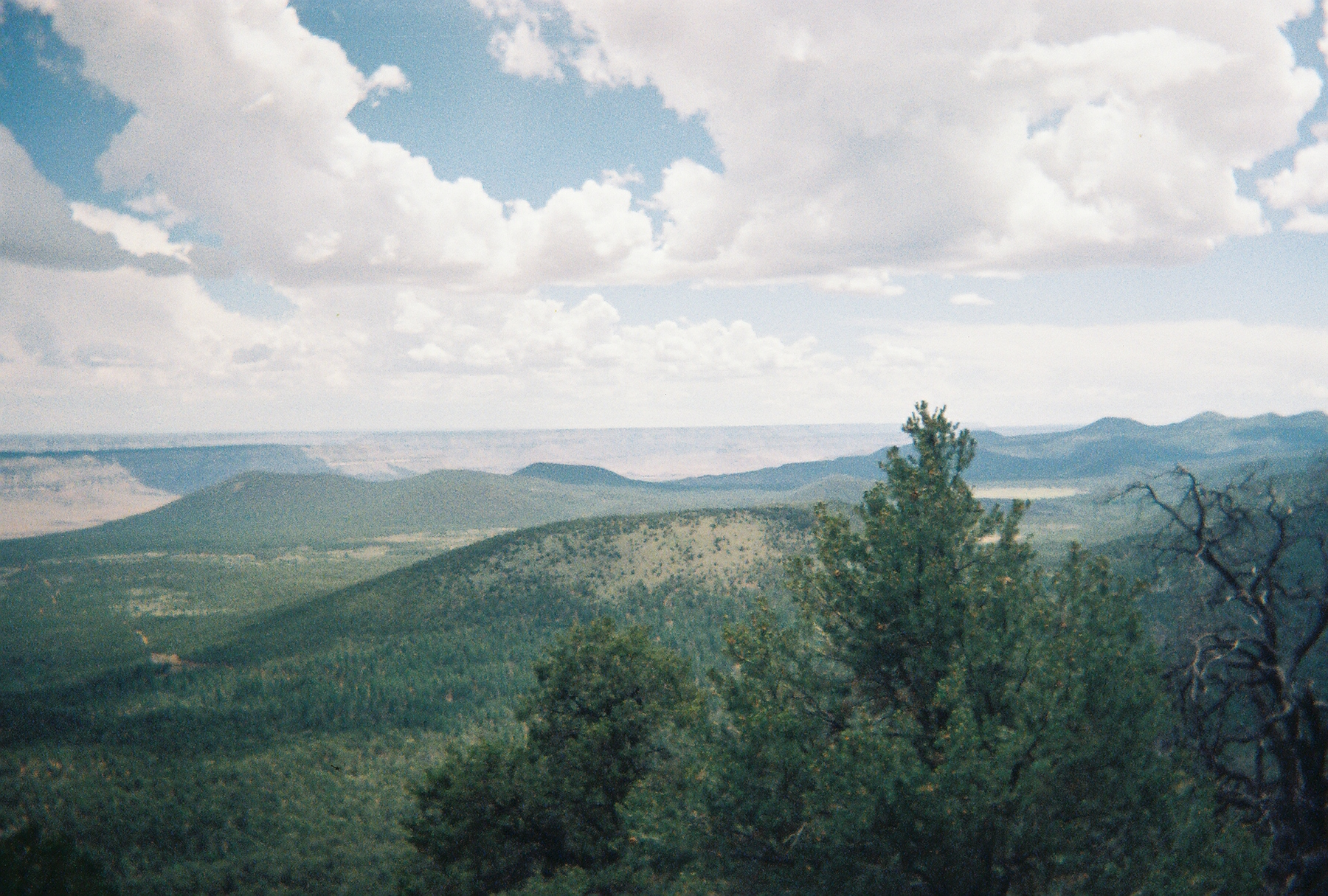
View from the top of Mt. Trumbull

The Mount Trumbull Wilderness is north of Grand Canyon National Park and in the Grand Canyon-Parashant National Monument. It is approximately 60 miles southwest of Fredonia, Arizona and about 60 miles south of St. George, Utah. It is about 7 miles north of the Mount Logan Wilderness.

The namesake of the wilderness, Mt. Trumbull, is 8,028 feet (2,446m) at its highest point. A 2.5 mile trail to the top can be accessed from Mohave County Road 5. The mountain was named by John Wesley Powell after the Illinois Senator Lyman Trumbull.

== Flora ==
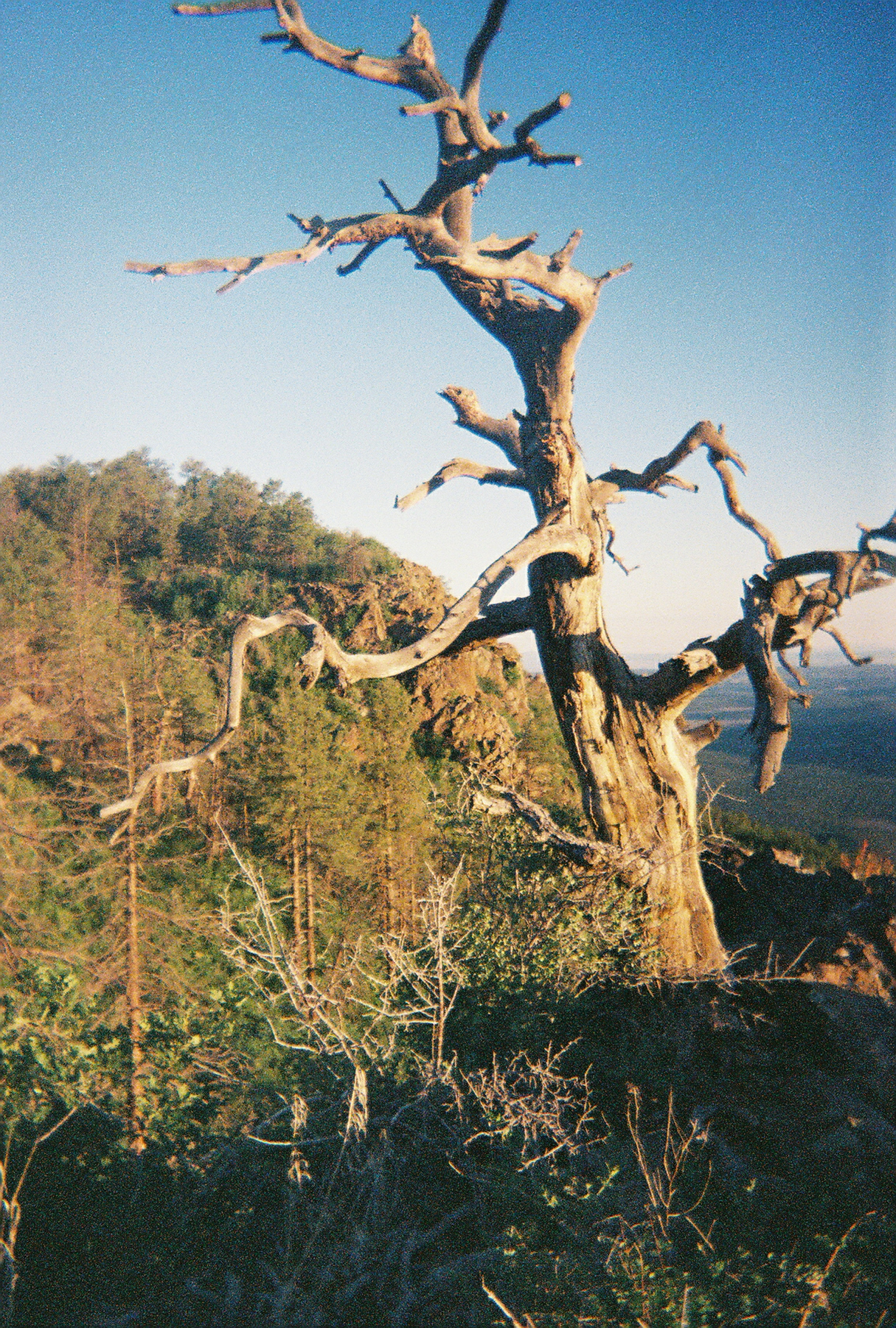
Dead tree at the top of Mt. Trumbull

At lower elevations the vegetation of the wilderness consists of Utah juniper (Juniperus osteosperma), pinyon pine, Mojave yucca (Yucca schidigera), and sagebrush (Artemisia tridentata). Moving up, the vegetation slowly changes into ponderosa pines. The area was heavily logged in the late 19th century resulting in most ponderosas being new growth, thus small, but some towering old growth ponderosa pines can be seen in the Wilderness that are more than 500 years old. There are also various types of grasses which grow intermittently throughout the wilderness.

== Fauna ==
The wilderness is home to a variety of animals. Mule deer are a common sight in the mornings and late afternoons. There are a large number of squirrels including the Kaibab squirrel, transplanted to the area from the south rim of the Grand Canyon in the 1970s. Other more rare animals include pronghorn deer and mountain lions. There are also a variety of lizards in the area including horned lizards. Birds present include red crossbills, Steller's jays, common ravens and many others.

== Geology ==
The Mt. Trumbull mesa is capped by a 3.6 million year old dark grey basalt lava flow, one of the first eruptions in the Uinkaret volcanic field. The volcanic field has spawned at least 213 known eruptions since then, including seventeen lava flows that poured into the Grand Canyon and dammed the Colorado River. The most recent eruption was at Little Springs approximately 960 years ago. Its lava flow can be seen just south of Mt. Trumbull along BLM road 1044. The Mt. Trumbull lava flow cap protects the colorful Moenkopi Formation beneath that would have otherwise been eroded away long ago. An undated and unnamed cinder cone sits on top of the mesa. It erupted through the original 3.6 million year old basalt cap likely in the last few hundred thousand years based on minimal surface erosion. It ejected bright red volcanic cinders and lava bombs which can be seen along the switchback trail.

== Archaeology ==
The wilderness contains both prehistoric and historic archaeological sites. The Ancestral Puebloans are known to have inhabited the area, and an archaeological field school is conducted in and around the area each summer 1. In historic times the members of the Church of Jesus Christ of Latter-Day Saints used the area to harvest lumber to build many of the structures in St George, Utah.

== See also ==
- Wilderness Act
- List of U.S. Wilderness Areas
- List of Arizona Wilderness Areas
