= Mount Logan Wilderness =

Protected area in Mohave County, Arizona

- IUCN category Ib (wilderness area)
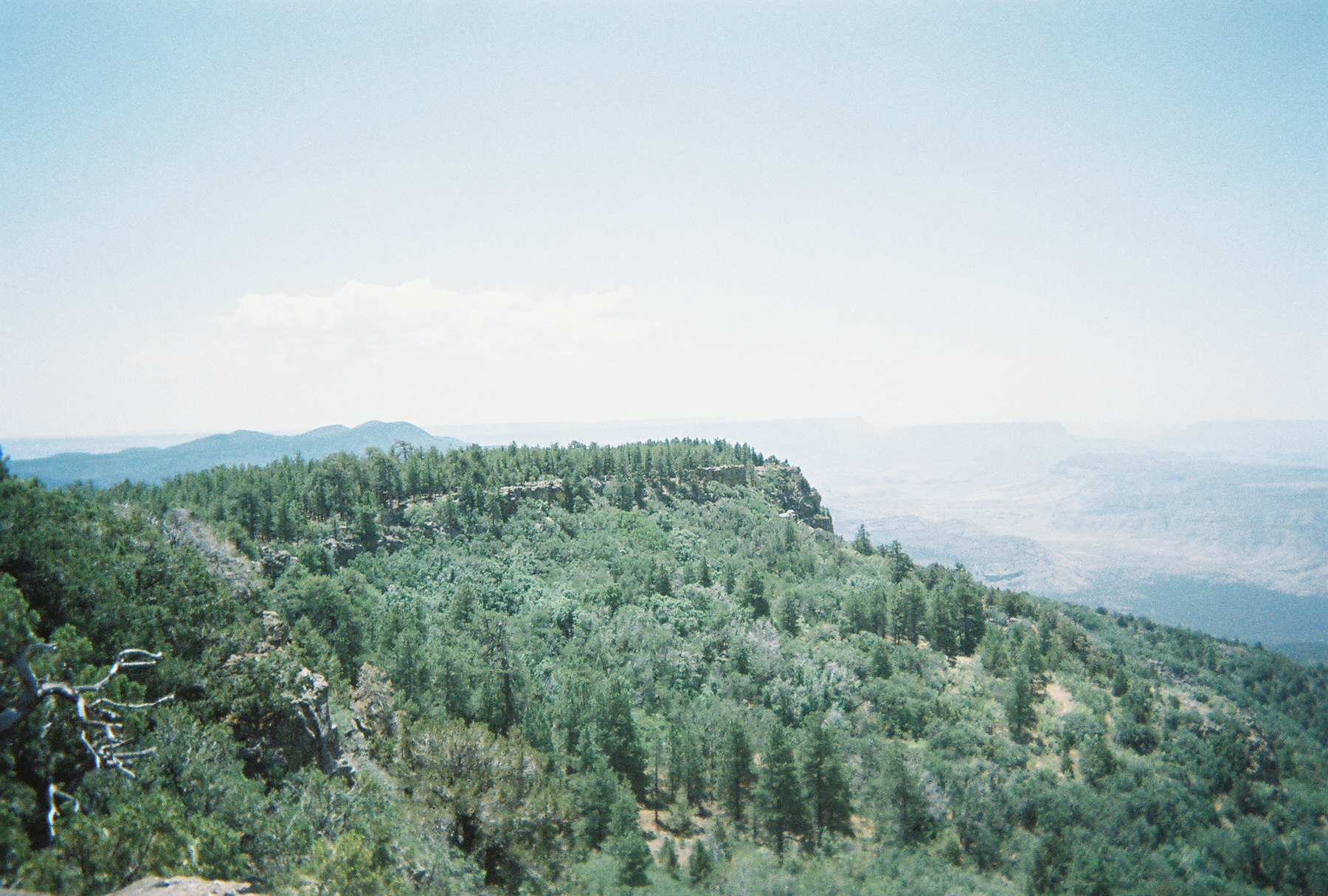
- Interactive map of Mount Logan Wilderness
- Location: Mohave County, Arizona, United States
- Nearest city: Fredonia, Arizona
- Coordinates: 36.318°N 113.204°W
- Area: 14,650 acres (5,930 ha)
- Established: 1984
- Governing body: Bureau of Land Management

The Mount Logan Wilderness is a 14,650 acre (59 km^{2}) U.S. wilderness area on the Arizona Strip and is part of the Uinkaret Mountains, a small regional range. It is located about seven miles south of the Mount Trumbull Wilderness. The wilderness is within the Grand Canyon-Parashant National Monument and is managed by the BLM.

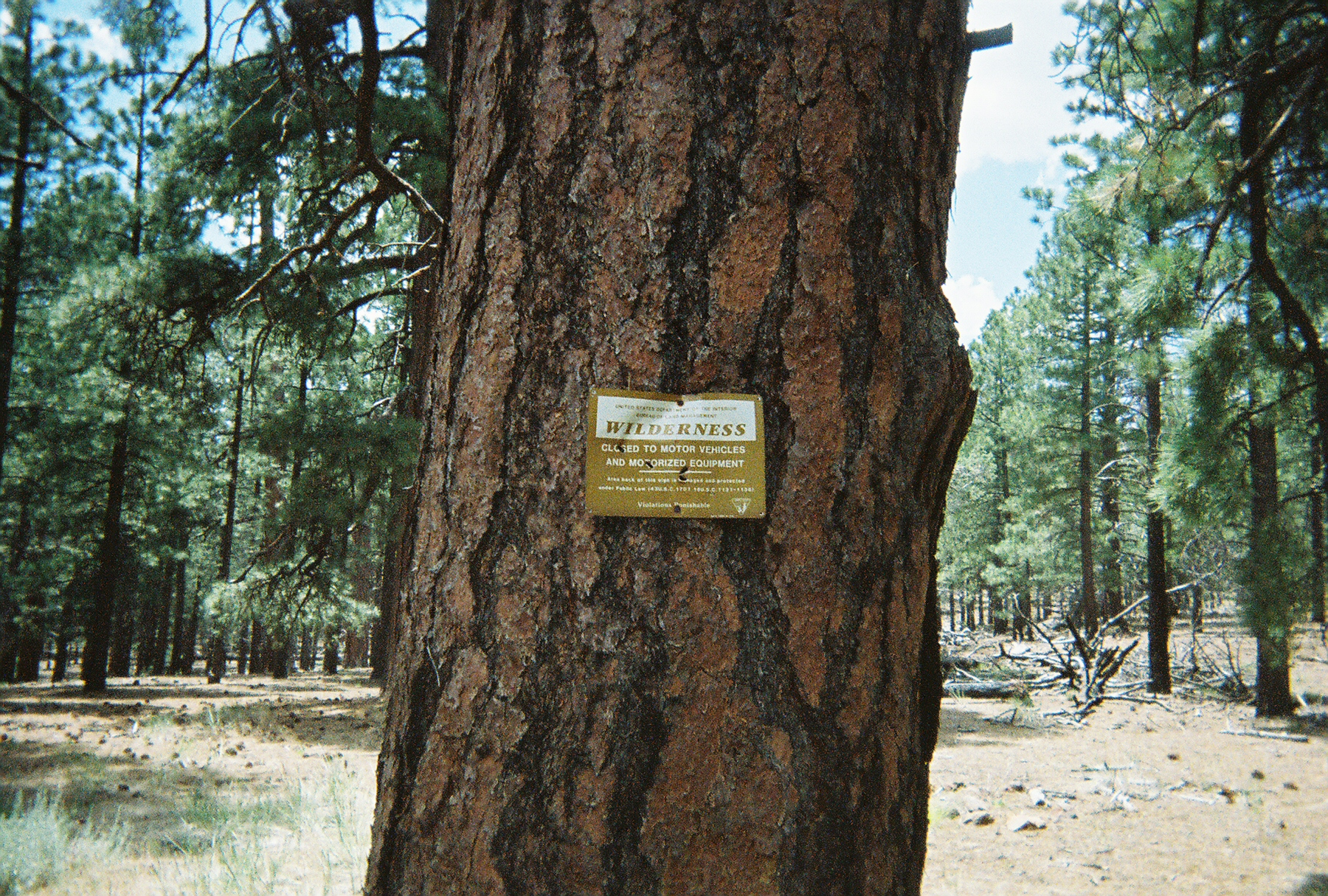
Wilderness sign in the Mt. Logan Wilderness

== See also ==
- List of U.S. Wilderness Areas
- List of Arizona Wilderness Areas
