= Grand Canyon–Parashant National Monument =

Protected area in northern Arizona

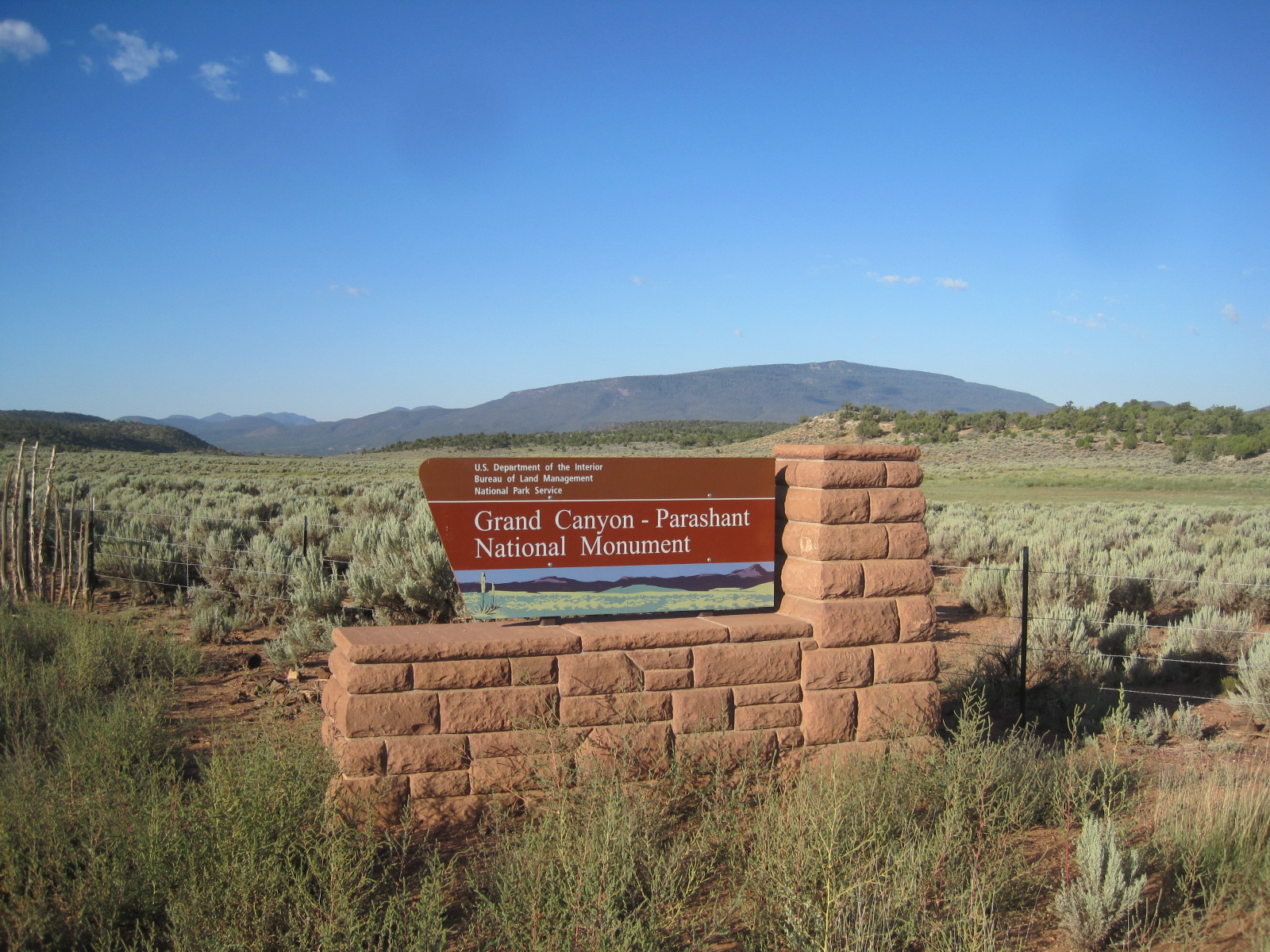
- A sign indicating an entrance to the monument on the Toroweap road
- Interactive map of Grand Canyon–Parashant National Monument
- Location: Mohave County, Arizona, USA
- Nearest city: Las Vegas, Nevada
- Coordinates: 36°24′N 113°42′W
- Area: 1,048,325 acres (4,242.42 km^{2})
- Established: January 11, 2000; 26 years ago
- Governing body: National Park Service and Bureau of Land Management
- Website: Grand Canyon–Parashant National Monument

Grand Canyon–Parashant National Monument (sometimes referred to as Parashant National Monument) is located on the northern edge of the Grand Canyon in northwest Arizona, on the Arizona Strip. The monument was established by Presidential Proclamation 7265 on January 11, 2000.

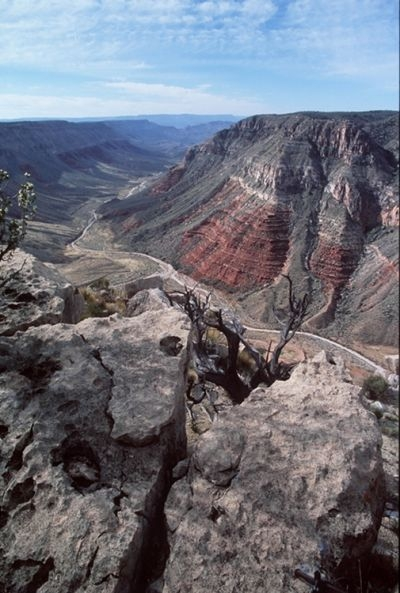
Side canyon in the National Monument

== Description ==
The national monument is a very remote and undeveloped place jointly managed by the National Park Service (NPS) and the Bureau of Land Management (BLM). There are no paved roads into the monument and no visitor services. The 1,048,325-acre (424,242 ha) monument is larger than the state of Rhode Island. The BLM portion of the monument consists of 808,747 acres (327,288 ha). The NPS portion contains 208,453 acres (84,358 ha) of lands that were previously part of Lake Mead National Recreation Area. There are also about 23,205 acres (9,391 ha) of Arizona State Land Department lands and 7,920 acres (3,210 ha) of private lands within the monument boundaries. Grand Canyon–Parashant is not considered a separate unit of the NPS because its NPS area is counted in Lake Mead National Recreation Area.

Elevation ranges from 1,230 feet (370 m) above sea level near Grand Wash Bay at Lake Mead, to 8,029 feet (2,447 m) at Mount Trumbull. The Interagency Information Center is located in the BLM Office in St. George, Utah.

The name Parashant is derived from the Paiute word Pawteh 'ee oasoasant, meaning "tanned elk hide," or "softening of the elk hide."

There are a number of ruins of former Mormon settlements in the area, such as the Oak Grove Dairy.

== Wilderness areas ==
Grand Canyon–Parashant includes the following wilderness areas:

- Grand Wash Cliffs Wilderness
- Mount Logan Wilderness
- Mount Trumbull Wilderness
- Paiute Wilderness (part)

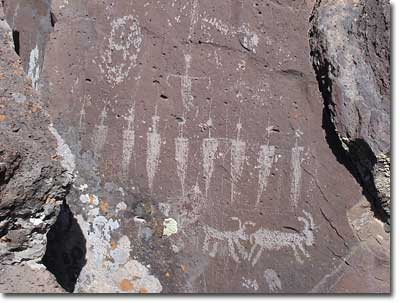
Petroglyphs at Grand Canyon–Parashant

== Cave animals ==
So far, a 2005 expedition to examine 24 caves in the park has produced two new species of millipede, the first barklouse discovered in North America, a whole new genus of cricket and four new cricket species.

== See also ==
- List of national monuments of the United States
