= Ojito Wilderness =

Wilderness Area in New Mexico

- IUCN category Ib (wilderness area)
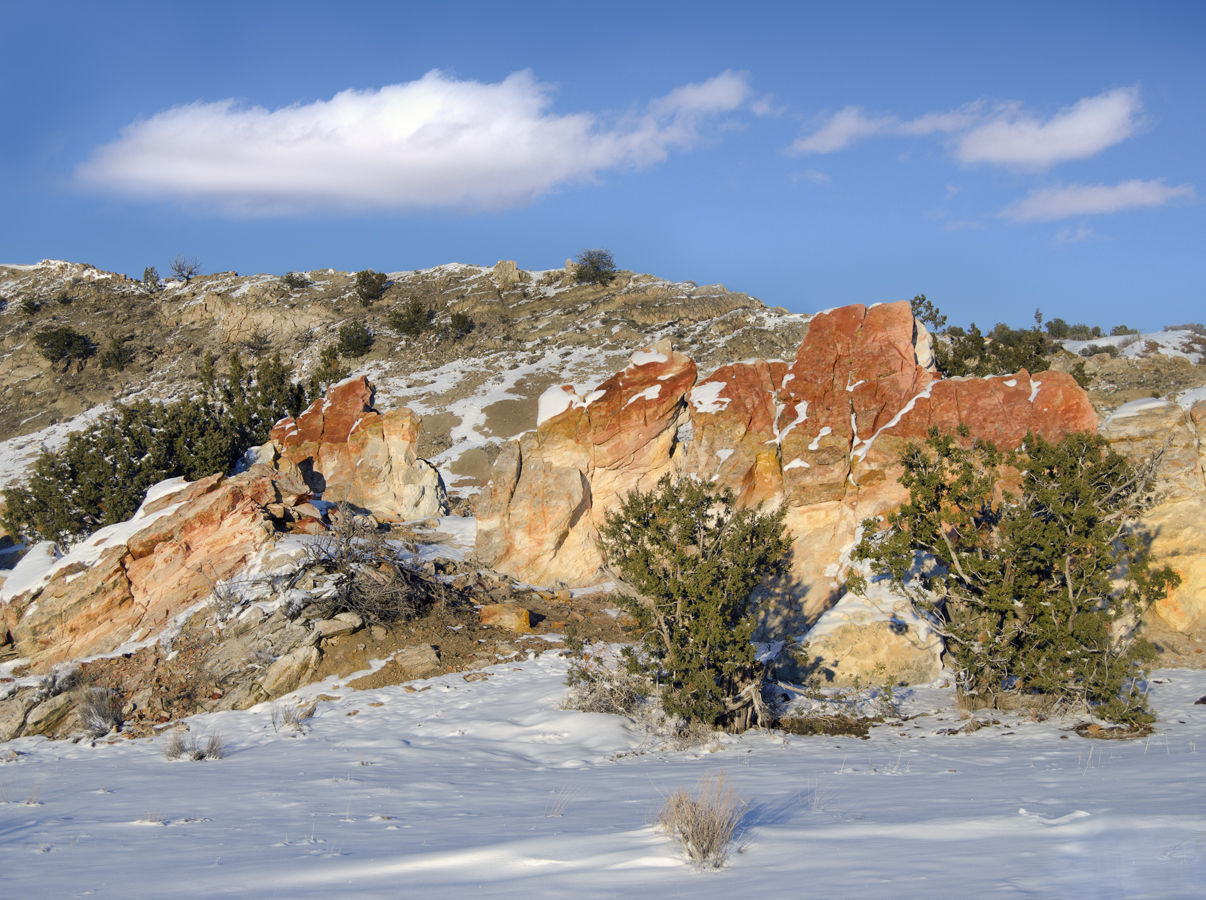
- Ojito Wilderness in winter

- Location within the United States
- Location: Sandoval County, New Mexico, United States
- Nearest city: Bernalillo
- Coordinates: 35°31′47.8″N 106°53′57.6″W
- Area: 11,823 acres (47.85 km^{2})
- Established: 2005
- Governing body: United States Bureau of Land Management
- Website: Ojito Wilderness

Ojito Wilderness is a designated Wilderness Area in Sandoval County, New Mexico, administered by the U. S. Bureau of Land Management. Established in 2005, the 11,823 acre primitive area protects a rugged and austere landscape north of Albuquerque, and is open to primitive camping, hiking, and horseback riding.

== Background ==
Contiguous to the southern end of the Pueblo of Zia, the Wilderness Area was established in 2005 by Public Law 109-94, known as the “Ojito Wilderness Act”, which both created the protected area, and also took lands within the designated area into trust for the Pueblo of Zia Indian Reservation. While the Reservation would pay for both the appraisal of the land and the land itself, the territory in question would be held in trust by the Federal government, to ensure, in the words of the law, the ability of the public to “access the lands for recreational, scenic, scientific, educational, paleontological, and conservation uses”.

== The wilderness ==
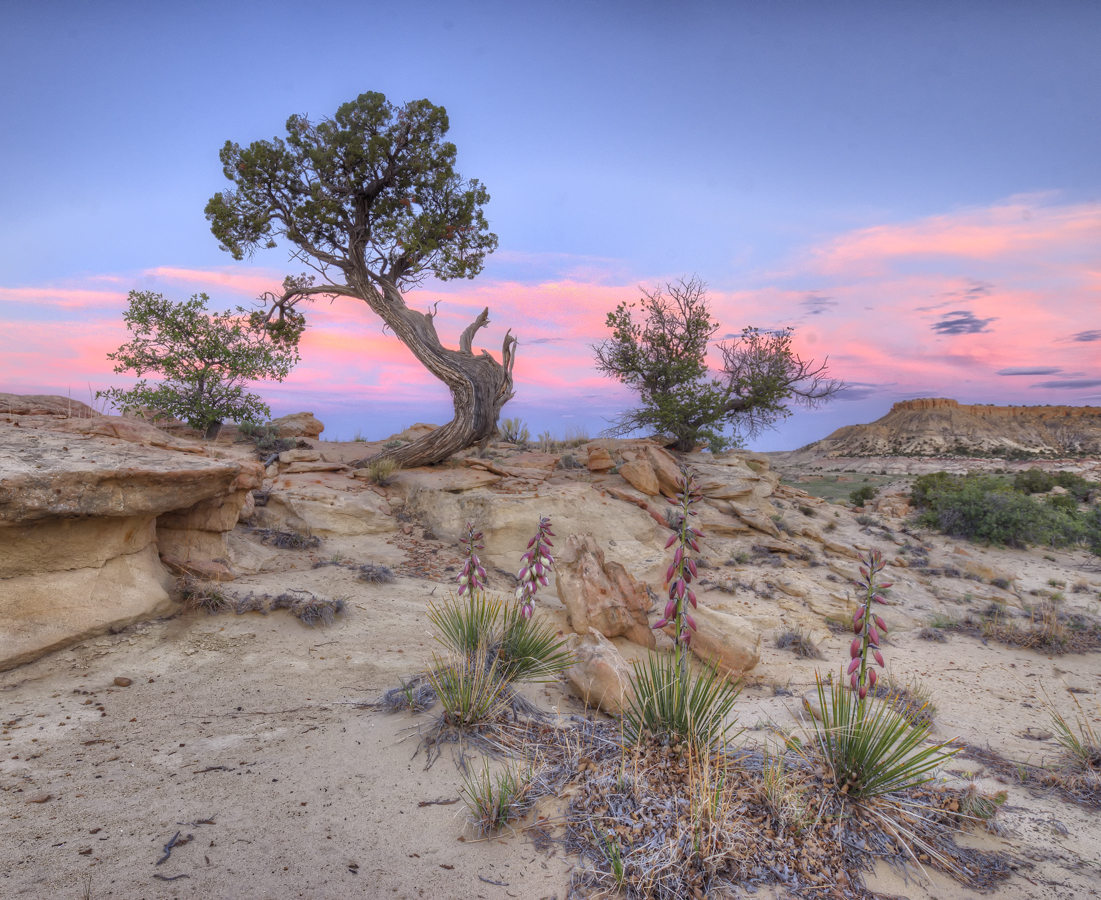
Ojito Wilderness at sunset

Despite its somewhat imposing and desolate appearance, the lands within Ojito Wilderness show evidence of habitation going back millions of years. Many types of fossils are found in the Jurassic-era Morrison Formation sandstone of the area, as well as large sections of petrified trees and one of the largest dinosaur skeletons ever discovered, the Seismosaurus. Evidence of human activity in the area include ruins and artifacts from prehistoric Ancient Puebloans, Spanish, and Navajo, testifying to the ability of these peoples to survive in the hot, waterless environment. Physically, the area is a dry, austere environment of multi-colored sandstone, terraces, box canyons and arroyos. Small amounts of piñon and juniper can be found in the Wilderness, as well as a unique stand of ponderosa pine, the lowest elevation in New Mexico where these trees can be found.

== Location and access ==
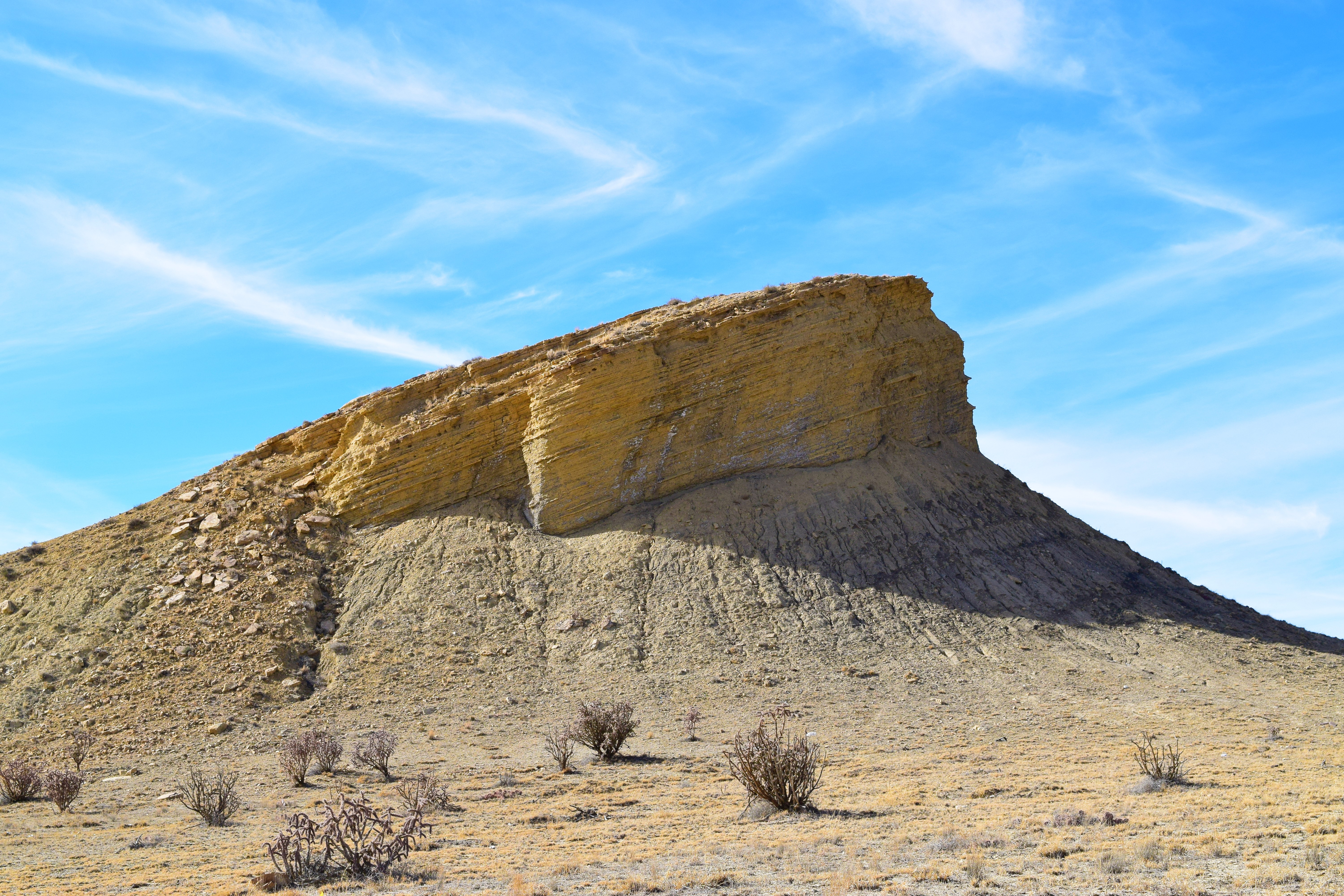
Uplift in Ojito Wilderness

The Ojito Wilderness is located in Sandoval County, north of Bernalillo and can be accessed via U. S. 550 and County Road 906, an unimproved road also known as the Cabezon Road. There are two marked trailheads in the area, the Seismosaurus Trailhead, and the Hoodoo Trailhead, both of which can be accessed by County Road 906. Hiking, Backpacking, horseback riding and primitive camping are allowed in the Wilderness without a permit, though the BLM is quite insistent on reminding visitors to bring in all water required.

== See also ==
- Pueblo of Zia
