= List of people from Fresno, California =

This is a list of people from Fresno, California.

== A ==
- Ron Adams – former basketball coach at Fresno State, NBA assistant coach of Golden State Warriors, 4-time NBA Champion
- Armen Alchian – economist
- Jenifer Alcorn – professional boxer
- Courtney Alexander – former NBA player, Dallas Mavericks
- Rafer Alston – former NBA player, Orlando Magic
- Charles Amirkhanian – composer
- Ron Anderson – former NBA player, Cleveland Cavs
- Maximilian Arfsten – soccer player
- Jeff Atmajian – Hollywood orchestrator
- Phil Austin – writer, actor, The Firesign Theatre
- Alan Autry – actor, former mayor of Fresno
- Brad Avakian – politician and senator

== B ==
- Baeza – rapper
- Ross Bagdasarian, Sr. – actor, singer, musician
- Stephen Baker – former NFL player, New York Giants
- Robert Beltran – actor, Star Trek: Voyager
- Bob Bennett – former head baseball coach at Fresno State
- Don Bennett – Alaska state politician
- Laura Berg – Olympic gold medalist softball player
- Robert Alan Beuth – actor, playwright, and sculptor
- Villyan Bijev – soccer player
- Ewell Blackwell – six-time MLB All-Star pitcher
- Milton Blanco – soccer player
- Heidi Blickenstaff – actor
- Deborah Blum – writer for the Fresno Bee, Pulitzer Prize winner
- DeWitt Bodeen – screenwriter
- Tommy Bond – child actor in Our Gang (Little Rascals) series
- Bobby Bonds – former Fresno Giants player, 3-time MLB All-Star
- John W. Bones – architect
- Frenchy Bordagaray – MLB baseball player
- Bruce Bowen – former NBA player, San Antonio Spurs
- Johnny Boyd – AAA and USAC Champ Car driver
- Gregory "Pappy" Boyington – World War II ace, retired in Fresno
- Ernest K. Bramblett – politician
- Lee Brand – mayor of Fresno
- John Brascia – actor and dancer
- Tyler Bray – NFL quarterback
- Robert B. Brewer – U.S. Army officer

== C ==
- Brian Cage – professional wrestler, TNA Impact, AEW
- Ernie C – musician, guitarist for the rock group Body Count
- David Carr – former NFL player, Houston Texans
- Derek Carr – NFL player, formerly with Las Vegas Raiders
- Mike Chabala – soccer player
- Frank Chance – Baseball Hall of Famer
- Christian Chaney – soccer player
- Luke Chueh – artist
- Andrew Christian – underwear designer
- Chris Colfer – actor, Kurt Hummel on TV series Glee
- Lorraine Collett – Sun-Maid Raisin Girl
- Harold Comstock – World War II fighter ace
- Mike Connors (aka Krekor Ohanian) – actor, Mannix
- Victor Conte – BALCO founder
- Dick Contino – musician, accordionist
- Ryan Cook – MLB pitcher, Oakland A's
- Terry Cooney – former MLB umpire
- Joe Cooper – NFL player
- William John Cooper – served as U.S. Commissioner of Education, 1929–33
- Young Corbett III – professional boxer
- Pat Corrales – former MLB player and manager
- Jim Costa – U.S. House of Representatives
- Bobby Cox – former MLB player, retired Hall of Fame manager, Atlanta Braves
- Ron Cox – NFL player
- Phil Cristian – musician, Cheap Trick
- Dwayne Crump – former NFL player, St. Louis Cardinals
- Tyrone Culver – Miami Dolphins NFL player

== D ==
- Lucius Davis (born 1970) – basketball player
- El Daña – drag king
- Bison Dele (born Brian Williams) – former NBA player, Los Angeles Clippers
- Trent Dilfer – former NFL quarterback of Super Bowl champion Baltimore Ravens, Monday Night Football commentator
- Harry Dixon (1890–1967), metalsmith, jewelry designer, sculptor, and educator
- Harry St. John Dixon (1848–1898), lawyer, military officer, and cattle rancher
- Maynard Dixon (1875–1946), painter whose body of work focused on the American West
- Cynthia Doerner (born 1951), Australian tennis player and coach

== E ==
- Jerry P. Eaton – geologist, born near Fresno
- Henry Ellard – former Los Angeles Rams wide receiver, former NFL coach
- Dick Ellsworth – former MLB pitcher
- Melvin Ely – former NBA player, Los Angeles Clippers
- John Erickson – former professional golfer
- Johnny Estrada – MLB player
- William Everson – poet
- Dana Ewell – convicted triple murderer

== F ==
- Fashawn – rapper
- Kevin Federline – ex-husband of Britney Spears
- Freddy Fender – singer, songwriter
- Andy Finch – member of Olympic snowboarding team
- Tom Flores – former NFL quarterback, former Oakland Raiders head coach, NFL Hall of Fame member
- Mac Foster – professional boxer
- Farrah Franklin – singer, model, former member of Destiny's Child
- Jethro Franklin – former NFL player, Seattle Seahawks; assistant coach, Oakland Raiders
- Zoila Frausto Gurgel – MMA fighter, Bellator women's flyweight world champion
- Mike Freeman – former NFL player, Atlanta Falcons

== G ==
- Patrick K. Gamble – educator and United States Army officer
- Mark Gardner – former MLB pitcher, coach for San Francisco Giants
- Matt Garza – Milwaukee Brewers MLB pitcher
- Blackie Gejeian – race car driver and designer
- Paul George – NBA All-Star player, Philadelphia 76ers
- Matt Giordano – former Indianapolis Colts NFL safety
- Bill Glasson – former PGA Tour golfer
- Bob Glazebrook – former NFL player, Atlanta Falcons
- Tom Goodwin – former MLB player
- Christopher Gorham – actor
- Keith Gooch – former CFL football player
- Jalen Green – NBA player, Phoenix Suns
- Ed Gregory – former head basketball coach at Fresno State, Golden State Warriors
- Kenny Guinn – governor of Nevada

== H ==
- Sid Haig – actor
- Alex Hakobian – teacher, filmmaker
- Millard Hampton – former Olympian
- Brandon Hancock – former USC fullback, fitness expert
- Victor Davis Hanson – scholar, historian, author
- David Harris – Vietnam War draft resistance leader
- Derek Henderson – pro rollerblader, Razors Skate Co
- Chris Herren – former NBA player
- Lee Herrick – California Poet Laureate
- Pat Hill – former head football coach at Fresno State
- Jaime Hipp – former Olympian
- John Hoover – former MLB pitcher
- Tory Horton – NFL player, Seattle Seahawks
- Steve Hosey – MLB player
- Pat Howell – former NFL player, Atlanta Falcons
- Rex Hudler – former MLB player, broadcaster

== I ==
- Debora Iyall – singer of the 80s group Romeo Void

== J ==
- Vestee Jackson – former NFL player, Super Bowl champion Chicago Bears
- Chris Jefferies – former pro basketball player
- Adam Jennings – NFL player
- Keshon Johnson – NFL player
- Rafer Johnson – 1960 Olympic gold medalist, decathlon
- Bill Jones – California secretary of state
- Bobby Jones – former MLB pitcher, NY Mets
- Gary Jules – singer-songwriter

== K ==
- Robert Kendrick – former professional tennis player, at one time was ranked #69 in the world
- Mychal Kendricks – NFL linebacker, Philadelphia Eagles
- Eric Kendricks – NFL linebacker, Dallas Cowboys
- Kirk Kerkorian – billionaire businessman; owned Metro-Goldwyn-Mayer
- Joanna Kerns – actress, Growing Pains
- Richard Kiel – actor, James Bond films
- Angelina J. Knox – inventor, abolitionist, writer, and philanthropist; died in Fresno
- Josh Koscheck – UFC mixed martial artist
- Emily Kuroda – actress, Gilmore Girls

== L ==
- Daryle Lamonica – former NFL All-Pro quarterback, Oakland Raiders
- Jim Landis – former outfielder, Chicago White Sox
- Claude "Pop" Laval – photographer, historian
- Steven Anthony Lawrence – actor
- Sharon Leal – actor, Dreamgirls
- Philip Levine – poet
- Larry Levis – poet
- David Little – former NFL player, Philadelphia Eagles
- Héctor Lizárraga – professional boxer
- Brook Lopez – NBA player
- Robin Lopez – NBA player

== M ==
- Jim Maloney – former MLB pitcher, Cincinnati Reds
- Ricky Manning, Jr. – former NFL defensive back, Carolina Panthers
- J. P. Manoux – actor, writer
- Richard Marshall – former NFL player, San Diego Chargers
- Ryan Mathews – NFL running back, Philadelphia Eagles
- Bob Mathias – Olympic gold medal decathlete, former congressman; retired in Fresno
- Miranda Rae Mayo – actress
- Chad McCarty – former Olympian
- Marcus McCauley – NFL player
- Kevin F. McCready – contributor to anti-psychiatry movement
- Aari McDonald – WNBA player for the Los Angeles Sparks
- Audra McDonald – Tony Award-winning Broadway actress, singer
- Blake McDonald – racing driver
- Tim McDonald – former NFL player, San Francisco 49ers, coach
- T.J. McDonald – former NFL player, Los Angeles Rams
- Barry McGuire – rock and folk singer-songwriter
- Chris McNealy – former NBA player, New York Knicks
- Jim Merlo – former NFL player, New Orleans Saints
- Rick Merlo – former Olympian
- Dale Messer – former NFL player, San Francisco 49ers
- Barbara Morgan – astronaut, educator
- Larry Mucker – former NFL player, Tampa Bay Buccaneers
- Barlow Der Mugrdechian – historian and lecturer on Armenian studies

== N ==
- Michael Najarian – relationship and communication expert
- Armen Nalbandian – musician, composer
- Lorenzo Neal – former NFL fullback, San Diego Chargers

== P ==
- Bob Padilla – former football head coach at Fresno State, and NFL Detroit Lions
- Stephone Paige – former NFL player, Kansas City Chiefs
- Carson Palmer – NFL quarterback, Arizona Cardinals
- Vang Pao – Laotian general
- Lou Pardini – Grammy-nominated keyboardist, songwriter and vocalist; member of the rock band Chicago
- Rex Parker – Michael David Sharp, crossword blogger and English professor
- Maxie Parks – Olympic gold medalist
- Chip Pashayan – lawyer and Republican congressman
- David Peckinpah – television writer, producer and director
- Sam Peckinpah – film director and screenwriter, best known for The Wild Bunch
- Justin Peelle – former tight end who is currently the tight ends coach for the Atlanta Falcons
- Rod Perry – former NFL player, Los Angeles Rams; assistant coach, Oregon State
- David Phillips – entrepreneur; aka "The Pudding Guy"
- Slim Pickens – actor (born in Kingsburg, Fresno County)
- Planet Asia – rapper
- Cliff Pondexter – former NBA player, Chicago Bulls
- Quincy Pondexter – former NBA player, New Orleans Pelicans, assistant head coach of the Washington Huskies
- Chuck Poochigian – California state senator
- Keith Poole – former NFL player, New Orleans Saints
- Marquez Pope – former NFL player, San Francisco 49ers
- James Porteous – inventor of the Fresno Scraper
- Hal Haig Prieste – Armenian-American athlete and world's oldest former Olympic medalist

== R ==
- Radagun – musical group, began in Fresno
- Stewart Rhodes – founding member of the Oath Keepers
- Les Richter – former NFL player, Los Angeles Rams, Pro Football Hall of Fame inductee; former senior vice president of NASCAR; former president of the Riverside International Raceway
- Darryl Rogers – former head coach of Fresno State, San Jose State, Detroit Lions
- Phil Roman – animator, founder of Film Roman
- Nicole Row – bassist, vocals, Panic! At The Disco, Incubus
- Chester Harvey Rowell – journalist, Lincoln-Roosevelt League co-founder
- Aaron Ruell – actor, Napoleon Dynamite
- Johnny Russell – country western singer-songwriter

== S ==
- Todd Santos – former NFL player, San Francisco 49ers
- William Saroyan – Pulitzer Prize and Oscar-winning playwright, novelist
- John Scalzi – Hugo Award-winning science fiction author
- Gary Scelzi – NHRA champion
- Kate Scott – sportscaster
- Tom Seaver – MLB Hall of Fame pitcher, 3-time Cy Young Award winner; NY Mets, Cincinnati Reds
- Dick Selma – former MLB pitcher, Philadelphia Phillies
- Juan Serrano – flamenco guitarist
- David Seville, aka Ross Bagdasarian – songwriter, recording artist
- Michael Sharp – Crossword puzzle blogger (under the name Rex Parker)
- Frank Hamilton Short – lawyer, Conservation movement
- Kelly Skipper – NFL assistant coach for Buffalo Bills
- John Sontag – train robber, died in Fresno jail in 1893 and interred at Calvary Cemetery there
- Gary Soto – author, poet
- Dennis Springer – former MLB knuckleball pitcher for the Los Angeles Dodgers
- Sloane Stephens – tennis player, US Open champion
- Richard Martin Stern – author
- DeShawn Stevenson – NBA player, Atlanta Hawks
- Mike Stewart – former NFL safety, Los Angeles Rams
- Randy Stumpfhauser – BMX pro and four-time world champion
- William A. Sutherland – lawyer, author, politician
- Ashley Swearengin – former Mayor of Fresno
- Jim Sweeney – former head football coach at Fresno State
- Kevin Sweeney – former NFL player, Dallas Cowboys

== T ==
- Timmy T – singer of the multi-platinum hit song "One More Try"
- Tim Thackrey – former taekwondo athlete, US National Team, Pan Am Games Champion, Olympic coach
- Jerry Tarkanian – former head basketball coach at Fresno State, UNLV, San Antonio Spurs NBA
- Jacques Terzian – sculptor and businessperson in San Francisco
- Bernard Thompson – former NBA player, Portland Blazers
- Brian Turner – poet

== V ==
- Lolly Vegas – founder of rock band Redbone
- Pat Vegas – founder of rock band Redbone
- Billy Volek – former NFL quarterback, Tennessee Titans
- Jason Von Flue – Ultimate Fighter season 2 reality show, UFC veteran
- Bill Vukovich – two-time Indianapolis 500 winner

== W ==
- Marcus Walden – pitcher for the Milwaukee Brewers
- Mykal Walker – linebacker for the Atlanta Falcons
- Anthony Washington – NFL defensive back, Washington Redskins
- Tim Washington – NFL defensive back, San Francisco 49ers
- Heidi Watney – Boston Red Sox reporter for NESN
- Nick Watney – PGA Tour golfer
- Gary Weaver – NFL player, Oakland Raiders
- Del Webb – real estate developer, former owner of New York Yankees
- Marcus Wesson – convicted murderer
- Frederick C. Weyand – former U.S. Army chief of staff (1974–1976) and member of the Joint Chiefs of Staff
- Flex Wheeler – bodybuilder
- Michael Willett – singer, Shane on MTV's Faking It
- J.D. Williams – NFL player, Buffalo Bills, assistant coach at Georgia State
- Lynn Williams – soccer player for NJ/NY Gotham FC and the United States national team
- Marquice Williams – special teams coordinator for the Atlanta Falcons
- Randy Williams – Olympic gold medalist in the long jump
- Susan Montgomery Williams – world record holder for the largest bubble gum bubble
- Mick Wingert – voice actor and director
- Tony Woodruff – NFL player, Philadelphia Eagles
- Ickey Woods – NFL player, Cincinnati Bengals running back
- Rick Worman – CFL quarterback and coach, Grey Cup champion, coach of the Fresno Frenzy af2 football team
- Cameron Worrell – NFL player, Chicago Bears
- Xavier Worthy – NFL player, Kansas City Chiefs

== Y ==
- Conrad Yama – actor
- Steve Yarbrough – writer
- Charles Young – former NFL All-Pro tight end, San Francisco 49ers

== Z ==
- Steve Zaillian – Oscar-winning screenwriter
- Gus Zernial – former MLB player, Philadelphia Athletics
- Warren Zevon – singer-songwriter, "Werewolves of London"
