= Thomas Edwin Hughes =

California pioneer and businessman (1830 – 1919)

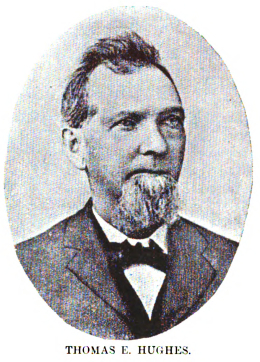
- Photo circa 1891
- Born: June 6, 1830; Morgantown, North Carolina
- Died: April 19, 1919 (aged 88)
- Resting place: Mountain View Cemetery; 36.750150°N 119.827990°W
- Other names: Father of Fresno
- Spouse(s): Mary J. Rodgers (m. 1850-her death in 1859); Annie E. Yoakum (m. 1866-her death in 1911)

Thomas Edwin Hughes (1830-1919) was a nineteenth century real estate developer and investor who, through business ventures and civic involvement, contributed to the initial development of Fresno, California.

== Early life ==
Thomas Edwin Hughes was born on June 6, 1830, in Morgantown, North Carolina. His father, also named Thomas, was born in Macclesfield, England and came to the United States in 1819. The family moved from North Carolina to Arkansas when the younger Thomas was five years old. He was one of five children.

Thomas Edwin Hughes married and, at twenty three years old, traveled to California with his wife and other family members. They rode in wagons drawn by cows and drove a herd of cattle across the country, ending in Murphy's Camp in October 1953. In Murphy's Camp, he attempted to grow wheat but did not turn a profit. He switched to cattle and sheep raising.

In 1856, Hughes, his wife and their two sons traveled back to Arkansas via steamship but soon decided to return to California. His wife died en route and he buried her in Stockton, California, where he settled with his sons after the journey back west with 400 head of cattle.

== Business career ==
=== Northern California ===
Beginning in 1859, Hughes made a life in Stockton enduring the ups and downs of farming and raising cattle. In 1866, he married again, to a woman from Alameda County named Annie Yokum. By 1867, he became Stanislaus County clerk and ex-officio recorder via a popular vote. At the end of his term, he turned back to sheep raising.

Hughes rented thousands of acres in Merced to raise the sheep and to grow grain. He and his wife also gave birth to a daughter in August 1872. However, his Merced-based enterprise met with unfavorable conditions and Hughes found himself deeply in debt. He went to Baja California to explore the potential of colonizing a Mexican land grant and came back to find his assets sold via bankruptcy as his creditors assumed he had left the country for good.

With almost no money, Hughes moved with his family to San Francisco in spring 1874. He dealt in real estate, supporting his family and growing his business connections. He became a real estate agent for the Central Pacific Railroad company which, at the time, was expanding into the San Joaquin Valley. Central Pacific's simple wood frame depot, then called Fresno station, anchored what became the city of Fresno.

On behalf of Central Pacific Railroad, Hughes managed excursions of home seekers from the San Francisco Bay Area to Fresno station. Wealthy men were also given special trips to the area to entice them to rent or buy land. By facilitating these property transactions, Hughes saw the large profits to be made.

While in San Francisco, Hughes met a businessman named Dr. Edward B. Perrin who owned land in the valley. Hughes agreed to raise sheep on Perrin's land in exchange for half the wool and for increasing the flocks. Hughes assigned this task to his sons, William Marshall Hughes and Major Joseph Edward Hughes and sent them to live in Fresno. Hughes continued to operate as a real estate agent for Central Pacific and moved to Fresno himself in June 1878.

=== Fresno growth ===
Already acting as a promoter of Fresno, Hughes noticed the success of the Central California Colony led by W. S. Chapman, Bernhard Marks and Martin Theodore Kearney. The Central California Colony, formed in 1875, inspired many similar agricultural colonies in the area. Following the trend, Hughes formed what was called the Fresno Colony.

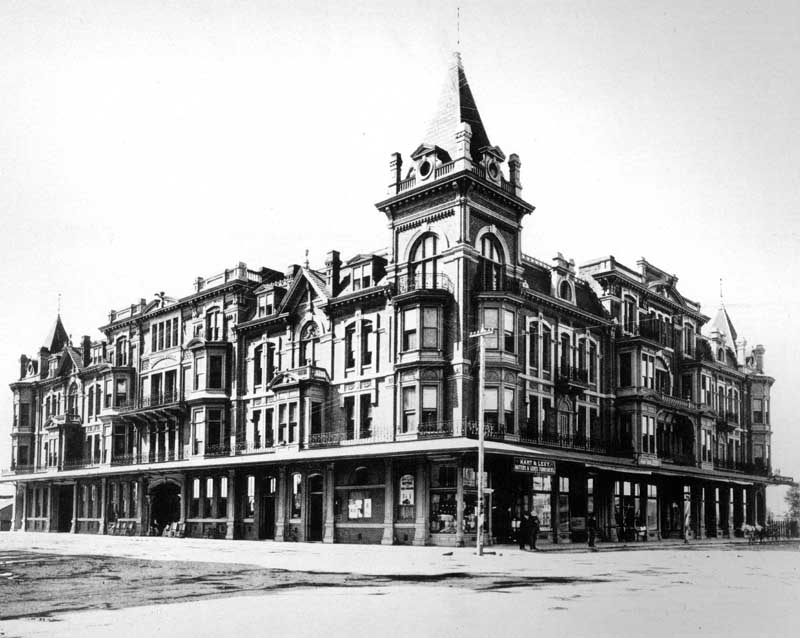
The four-story Hughes Hotel circa 1890

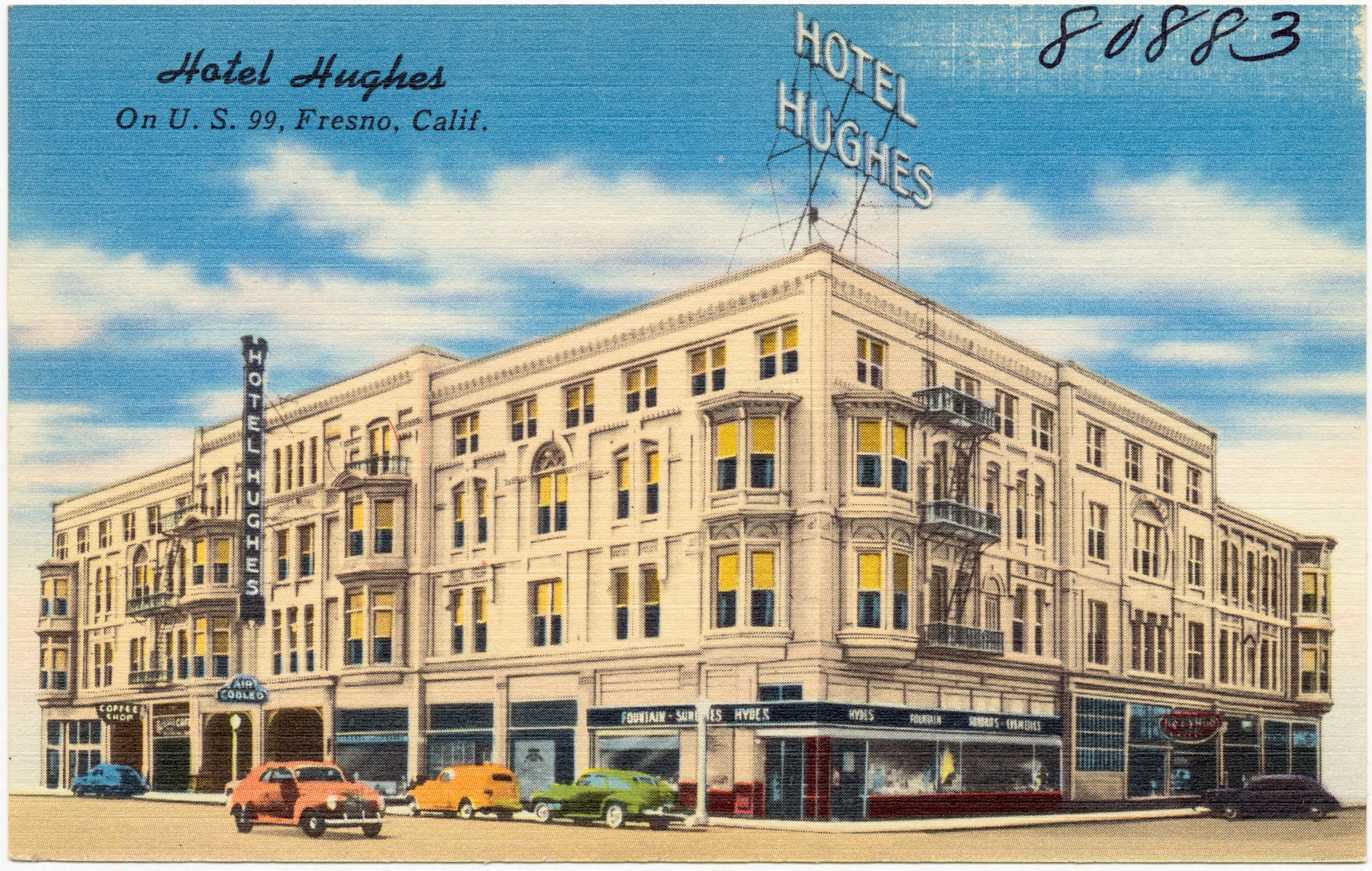
Postcard of the remodeled Hotel Hughes in the 1930s

He purchased 2880 acres of barren land in 1880 at $6.50 an acre. After dividing the land into twenty and forty-acre lots irrigating them, they could be sold for $50 an acre. The colony was situated just south of the growing downtown, so close that residents of his colony could send their children the Fresno school district. Easy access to city amenities was a selling point for potential buyers.

The success of the Fresno Colony created a financial windfall for Hughes and he reinvested it all into business ventures in the growing Fresno area. In 1881, he helped to establish the Fresno County Bank, another success story. Fresno County Bank was renamed First National Bank of Fresno in 1885 and continued to grow. In 1919, it was bought by the San Francisco-based Bank of Italy.

However, Hughes also encountered business failures, such as his Fresno Fruit Packing Company, the Fresno Gas Works and the ill-fated railroad extension towards Friant led by Marcus Pollasky.

Later in the 1880s, he financed the erection of two buildings in downtown Fresno. One was a three-story, Renaissance Revival style office and retail building designed by James M. Seadler, an architect from San Francisco. It began operation beginning in 1887 located on the northwest corner of Tulare and I Street, in the heart of Fresno's central business district.

On the southwest corner of that same Tulare and I Street intersection, Hughes built a hotel. It was also in a Renaissance Revival style and consisted of a four-story brick structure finished in a sandstone color. The hotel contained 200 rooms and featured a large central court, a dining room, a reading room, a billiard room and saloon and a steam laundry. At the time of its completion the Hughes was the largest hotel between San Francisco and Los Angeles. It was the first building in Fresno to have an elevator and the first Fresno hotel to have electric lights and a telephone in each room.

In 1887, Hughes invested in a horse-drawn streetcar operation, a predecessor to the Fresno Traction Company. Hughes sought to ensure the streetcar route ran past his hotel on I Street.

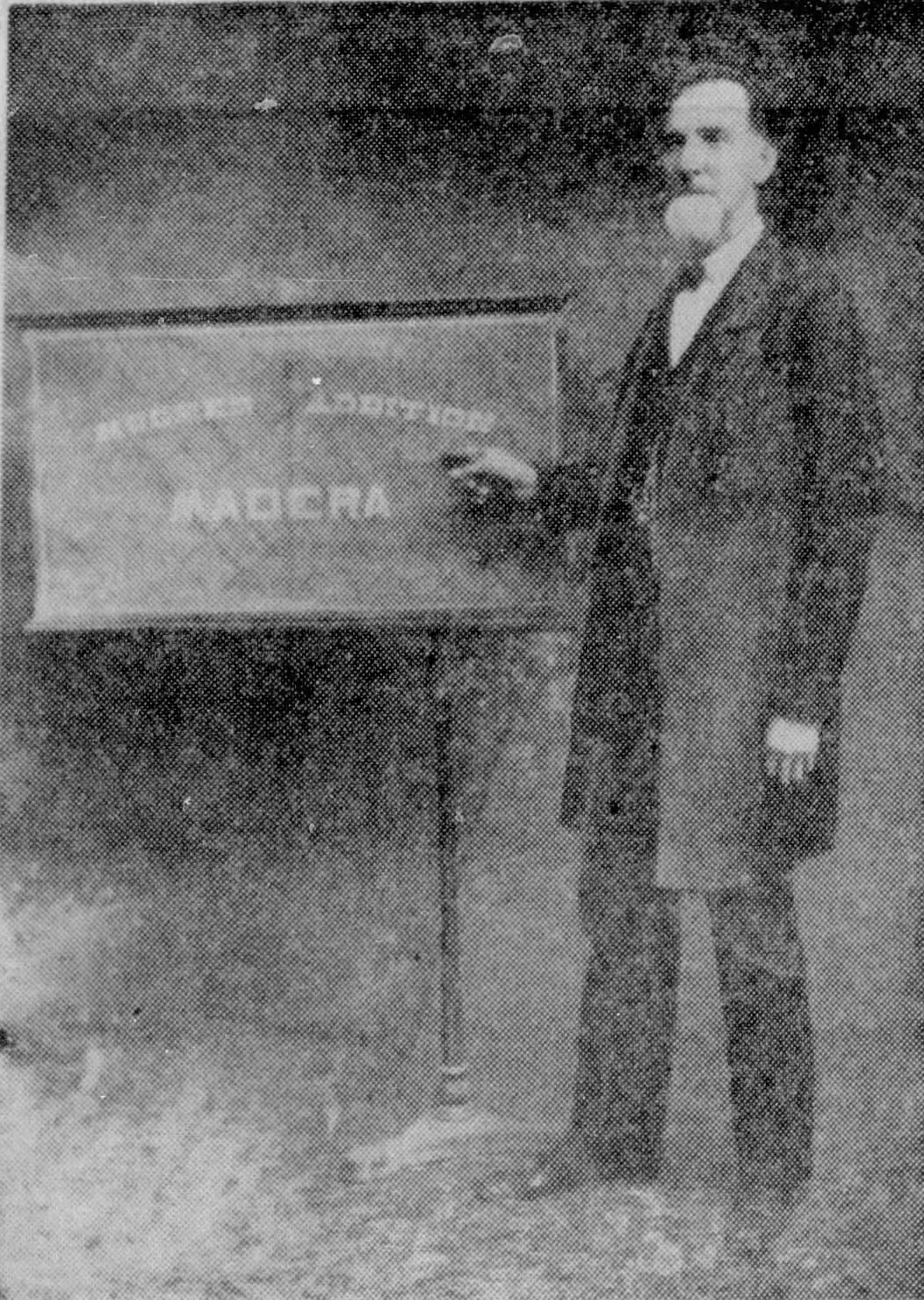
Thomas Hughes promoting a Madera agricultural colony which never came to fruition

In 1893, Hughes participated in the drive to slice off a northern portion of Fresno County to form Madera County. The drive was successful and Madera County was formed during a special election in May 1893. Hughes had a business interest in the change, having purchased a 3,300 acre ranch in the Madera area which he hoped to turn into an agricultural colony, similar to his earlier Fresno colony.

=== Crash and Mexico ===
1893 saw a large economic crash which forced Hughes into bankruptcy and he had to abandon many of his business interests in Fresno. He was forced into bankruptcy in January 1894 with liabilities totaling $176,520 ($6.42 million in 2024) and he was sued by many of his creditors in the years following the crash. The Hughes Hotel was turned over to the San Francisco Theological Seminary as a secured creditor. He moved with his family to Mexico.

In Mexico, he undertook a land development enterprise under a Mexican grant, but he disliked the exploitative peonage-style labor methods of the land owners. He shifted his efforts to mining development, with some success. However, the development of any business interests in Mexico were halted upon the start of the Mexican Revolution and Hughes decided to leave.

== Death ==
Hughes returned to California around 1908, residing near Los Angeles. During this time, he came back to Fresno for short visits or reunions and made sure to express to his children his wish to be buried in Fresno. He was in ill health for several years due to his advanced age.

Thomas Edwin Hughes died at his daughters home near Los Angeles on April 19, 1919, at the age of 88. His remains were transferred to Fresno and are interred at Fresno's Mountain View Cemetery. His headstone includes an inscription that reads "lovingly known as the Father of Fresno."

== Impact ==
=== Development of Fresno ===
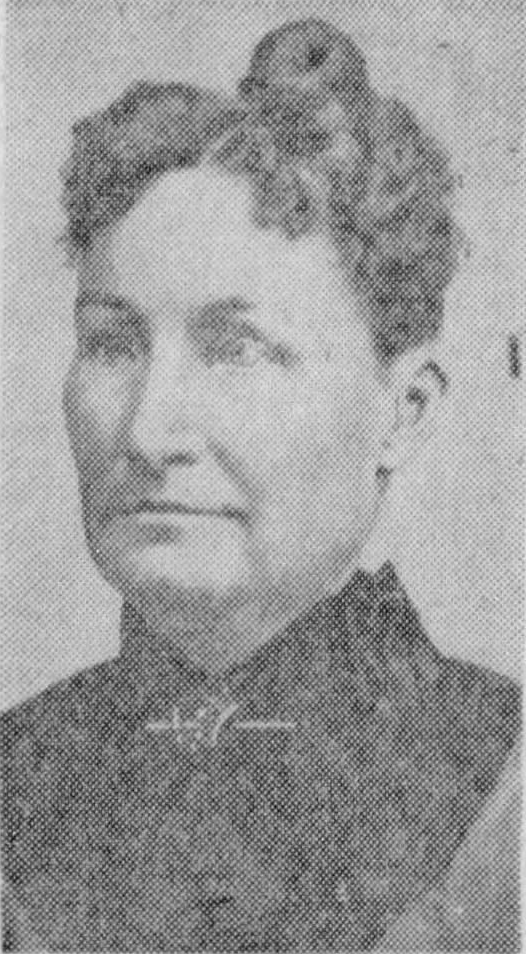
Annie Hughes, wife of Thomas E. Hughes

As a real estate agent for the Central Pacific Railroad, Hughes acted a booster for the Fresno area, hoping to entice potential renters and buyers. Hughes continued to promote Fresno widely when he formed his agricultural colony. These efforts saw Fresno grow from a tiny village to an incorporated city of thousands.

In addition to his business ventures, Hughes participated in many community-boosting civic pursuits. He led the construction of a Masonic temple. In 1883, Hughes partnered with Dr. Lewis Leach and others to form the "Fresno Fair Grounds Association." Hughes sold a tract of land to the group and furnished funds to construct a horse racing track at the site. Over the years, the horseraces at track developed into the modern Big Fresno Fair, attracting around 600,000 people in 2019. Hughes was also one of the first city trustees when Fresno incorporated in 1885.

After Hughes had lost ownership, the Hughes Hotel declined. By 1917, the building had become a hub for prostitution. The building was ultimately destroyed by an arson fire in 1953. Chukchansi Park was built on the land where the Hughes Hotel once stood.

The Fresno Morning Republican wrote the following about Hughes: "Indeed, it is but voicing the general sentiment of the people of Fresno...to say that no one among them has done so much for the improvement, growth and prosperity of that place, has given so much of his time, means and personal attention to public work and enterprises as he."

The Fresno Weekly Expositor expressed the following in January 1890: "While he has amassed $1,000,000 or more in the past 10 years, he has not aquired [sic] a dollar of it by oppressing creditors or taking advantage of those with whom he has dealings. Always approachable and unassuming, ever ready to help on a good cause or enterprise, he is preeminently the leading spirit and useful man of Fresno County."

=== Legacy ===
Annie Hughes, the wife of Thomas E. Hughes, was responsible for the organization of a free kindergarten which afterward was incorporated in the public schools.

His son William Marshall Hughes died at age 87 in Madera in 1945. He was Madera County treasurer from 1924 through 1938. His other son Major Joseph Edward Hughes finished his life as a real estate broker and died in his 90s. His great-grandson Joseph B. Hughes became the Madera County road commissioner.

The north-south thoroughfare Hughes Avenue in Fresno is named after Thomas E. Hughes.
