= Paul Paul =

Armenian politician (1894 - 1979)

Paul Paul (1894–1979) was a prominent Armenian American farmer and politician.

== Life ==
Of Armenian descent, Paul Paul was born in Bitlis, Bitlis Vilayet, Ottoman Empire in 1894. His parents were Israel and Bertha Paul. After emigrating to the United States with his family, he eventually arrived in Fresno, California in 1904 with his four siblings; Beatrice, Blanch, Arax, and Nora. The Paul family, who were then shoe repairmen, decided to become full-time farmers. Paul joined the Fresno Municipal Band in 1914 and served as its leader from 1923 to 1948. He was also an amateur wrestler. He worked in the insurance business for a number of years, then became a prominent farmer. From 1960 until his death in 1979, he was a member of the Fresno District Fair Board of Directors.

The family started the Pipco Fruit Company in 1952, which grew to 400 acres by the 1960s. The farming operation eventually expanded by 1600 acres into Fresno and Madera County.

He had three children; Don Paul went to college at UCLA where he played football, and later played for the Los Angeles Rams football team, from 1948 till 1955. Coached the Rams in the 1960s, and later opened The Rams Horn restaurant in Encino, Ca. He broadcast for CBS Television Sports on The NFL Broadcasts. Ronald Paul Sr. and Robert Paul, were involved in the Pipco, Inc., farming operations in Fresno and Madera counties. His grandson Ronnie Paul, Jr., did Radio Big Bands/Adult Standards and Old Time Radio Comedy on KAAT 103.1 FM in Fresno/Oakhurst Ca, under the name " Flying Home with Ronnie Paul". Also doing Television Broadcasting, under the same name "Flying Home with Ronnie Paul", airing Big Band/Adult Standards soundies and Classic Television Broadcasts for Cocola Broadcasting in Fresno, Ca. KSDI-TV 33.2.

== Legacy ==
The Fresno Fairgrounds has named the Paul Paul Theater after him.

In 1976, the International Institute named him the foreign-born citizen of the year.

== See also ==
- The Big Fresno Fair
