= Kearney Park (Fresno) =

- M. Theo Kearney Park and Mansion
- U.S. National Register of Historic Places
- California Historical Landmark
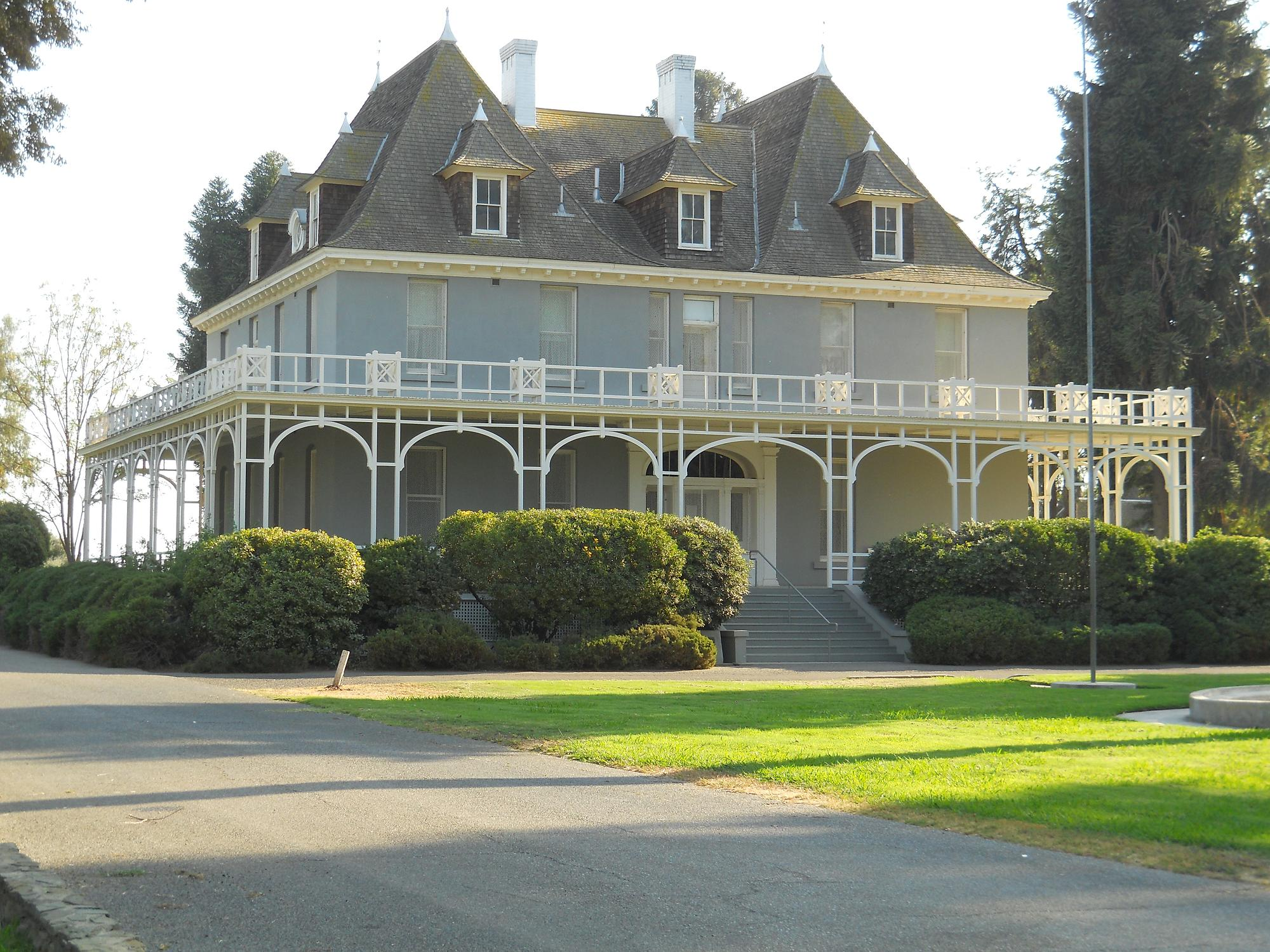
- Kearney Mansion in 2014
- Location: 6725 W. Kearney Blvd. Fresno, California
- Area: 225 acres (91 ha)
- Built: 1903
- Architectural style: Queen Anne
- Website: Official website
- NRHP reference No.: 75000426
- Added to NRHP: March 13, 1975

Kearney Park is a historic public park located west of Fresno, California. It is former residence of Martin Theodore Kearney and the community center of his Fruit Vale Estate agricultural colony. Kearney Mansion Museum is located in the park and operated by the Fresno Historical Society.

== History ==
Martin Theodore Kearney established his Fruit Vale Estate agricultural colony in 1889, allowing middle-class to purchase ten and twenty-acre lots and to start farming without the large financial outlay otherwise necessary. The estate was located just west of Fresno and spanned 6,800 acres (2,800 ha).

Many parts of the colony were cooperatively shared, such as fencing and irrigation, as well as an area in the middle of the estate which served as Kearney's residence and as a center for the community, a sort of ranch town or headquarters. By 1903, it included a general store, livestock barns, a dairy, a post office, a bell tower and other structures.

Kearney died in 1906 and in his final will, he bequeathed the then 5,400 acres (2,200 ha) Fruit Vale Estate to the Regents of the University of California with the wish that they establish an experimental station as an adjunct to the University's College of Agriculture. The University decided against establishing a college there and began selling off parcels while allowing it to continue operating as a working ranch and vineyard.

By 1949 the University had sold all the land except for the community center (Kearney's mansion and the surrounding park). It was leased to Fresno County for $1 per year, effectively turning over ownership. In 1962 the Fresno City and County Historical Society agreed to operate the mansion and park as a museum.

The site was added to the National Register of Historic Places in 1975.

== Design ==
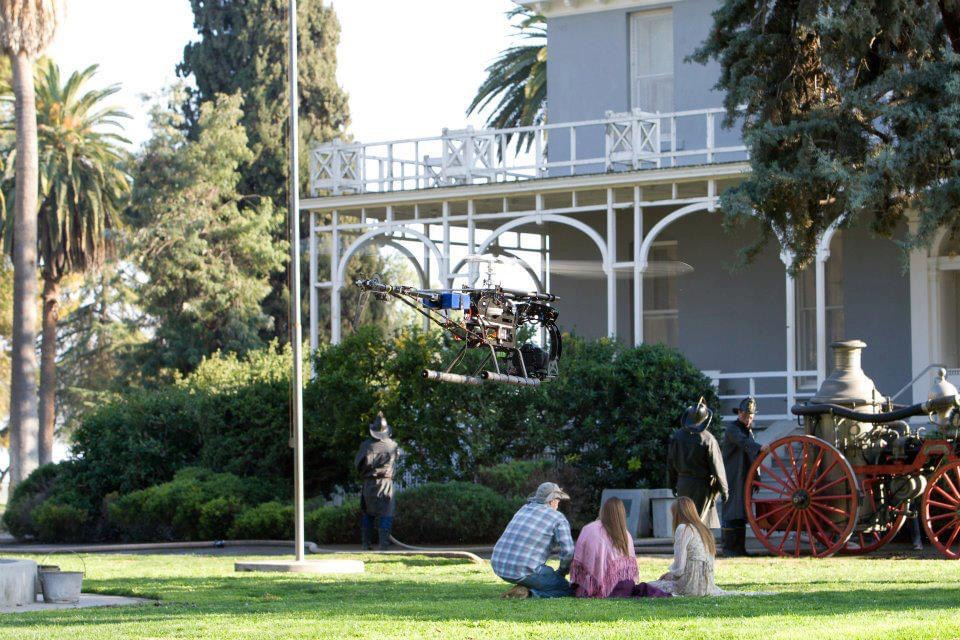
Kearney Mansion in 2012 during a film project

For his mansion, Kearney built a two-and-a-half story house constructed of adobe bricks laid two feet thick. It displays an exterior which includes high-pitched roofs, large arches made of lathe-cut wood and sharp gabled dormer windows that suggested towers. It was completed in 1903 in a Queen Anne architectural style and the interior was decorated with classic furnishings from overseas.

The entire estate, now a park, was 250 acres surrounding the mansion, with orange trees, olive trees, muscat grapes, alfalfa and a dairy farm. The grounds were designed by landscape architect Rudolph Ulrich, who created other notable gardens around California, such as at the Hotel Del Monte in Monterey, California. Kearney had even grander visions for the estate which never came to fruition before his death.

== Modern use and events ==
The park is open for day use, providing recreation with a playground, group picnic reservation areas, play fields, picnic shelters, dance slabs, horseshoe pits and a disc golf course. The mansion offers tours for guests.

The park has hosted civil war reenactments and Renaissance fairs as well as the annual "Hard Pan Classic" disc golf tournament.
