= The Big Fresno Fair =

Annual fair held in Fresno, California, USA

Coordinates: 36.73139°N 119.74980°W

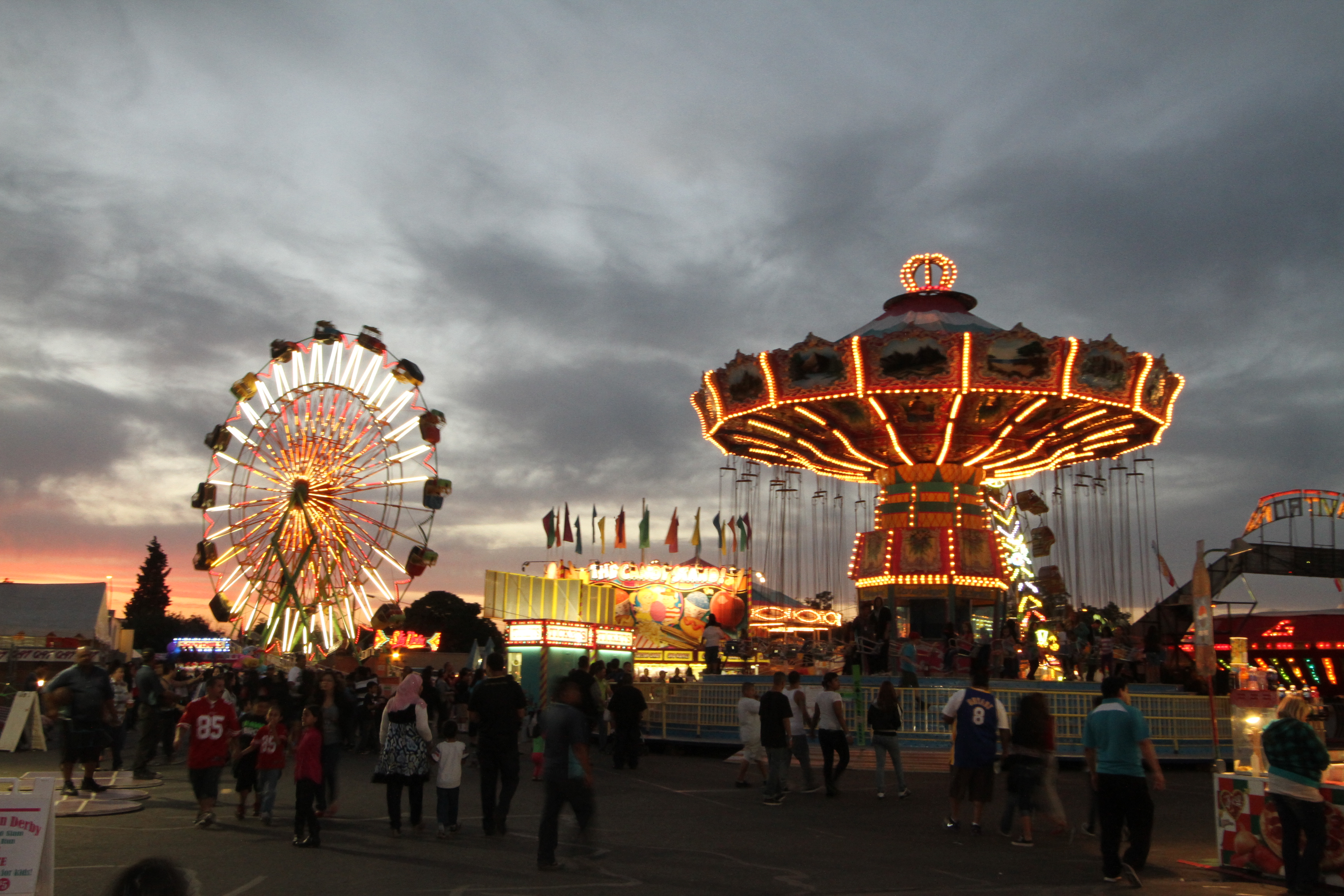
- The Big Fresno Fair at night
- Genre: State fair
- Location: Fresno, California
- Years active: 1884–1895; 1910–1941; 1948–Present
- Attendance: Approx. 600,000
- Website: Big Fresno Fair official website

The Big Fresno Fair, founded in 1884, is an annual fair held at the Fresno County Fairgrounds. The Big Fresno Fair is managed by the 21st District Agricultural Association, an entity of the California Department of Food and Agriculture Division of Fairs & Expositions. It is the largest annual event in the San Joaquin Valley, attracting around 600,000 people each October during its twelve-day run featuring exhibits, a livestock show, live horse racing, musical entertainment, educational programs and more. The Fair serves as a bridge between urban and rural California, educating visitors about the region's vibrant agricultural industry. Its mission is to "Educate, Celebrate and Have Fun".

In addition to being the site of the annual Fair, the Fresno Fairgrounds serves as a year-round rental facility that spans 165 acres (67 ha) held under a 50-year lease with the County of Fresno. The Fresno Fairgrounds hosts more than 250 annual events such as conventions, trade shows and banquets located in Fresno, California. More than 1.5 million people visit the Fresno Fairgrounds annually.

== History ==
=== Origin ===
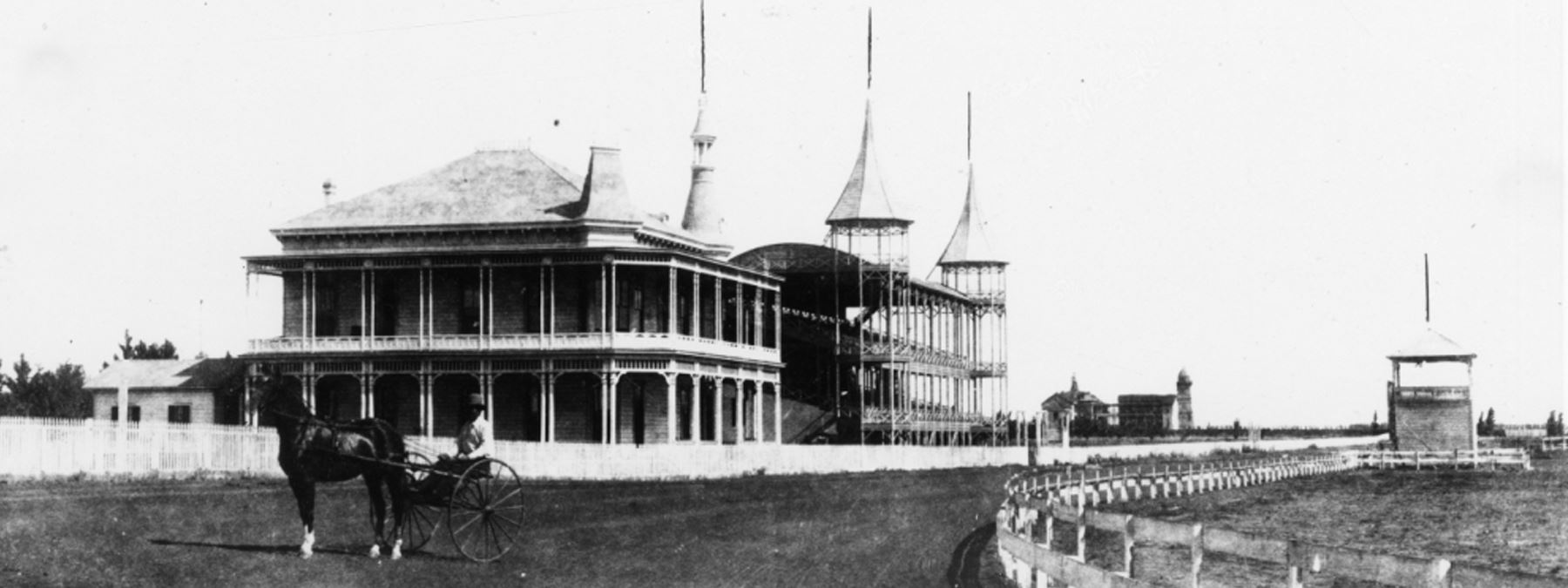
Racetrack Grandstands in 1888

A group of local businessmen, growers and ranchers formed an organization called the "Fresno Fair Grounds Association" in February 1883. The original directors were Dr. Lewis Leach, M. I. Donahou, Frederick A. Woodworth, A. B. Butler and T. M. Hughes. The association sold stock to raise funds and with those funds, bought a tract of land from Thomas E. Hughes & Sons and began construction of a horse racetrack. Following official admission to the National Trotting Association, the first races occurred in May 1884 and the new track was assessed to be in "first-class order" by a writer from the Sacramento Bee. The first Fresno Fair opened in October 1884 and featured a five-day race horse meet, a few produce displays and several head of livestock.

The fairgrounds only consisted of a racetrack until 1888, when a grandstand and a pavilion were completed a few weeks before the fair opened. The fair was well attended and the races draw many bettors, however by 1895, the fair succumbed to the depression of the 1890s and the fairgrounds property was put up for sale under foreclosure.

=== County ownership and management ===
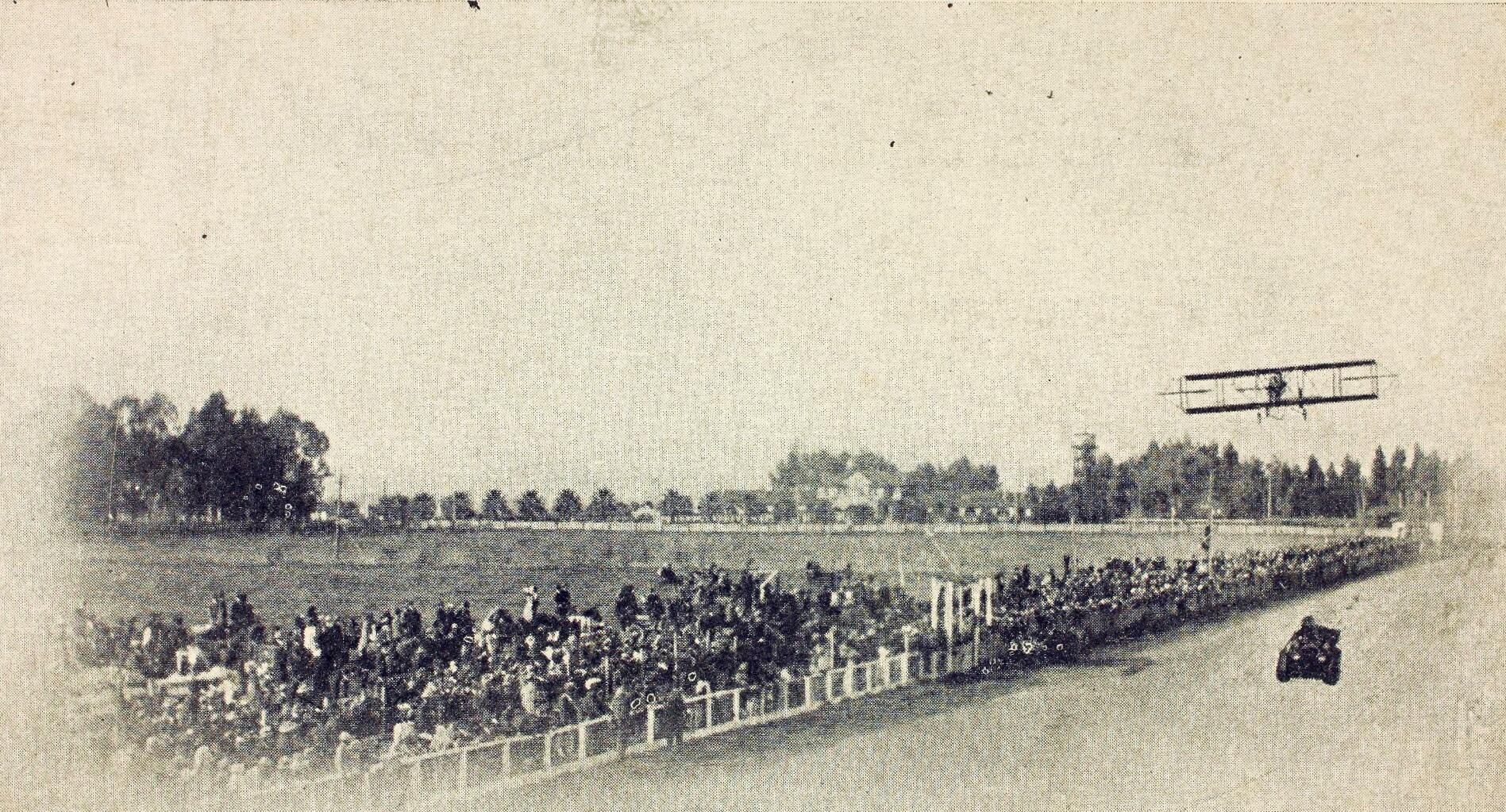
An airplane races an automobile at the fairgrounds horse racetrack in 1910

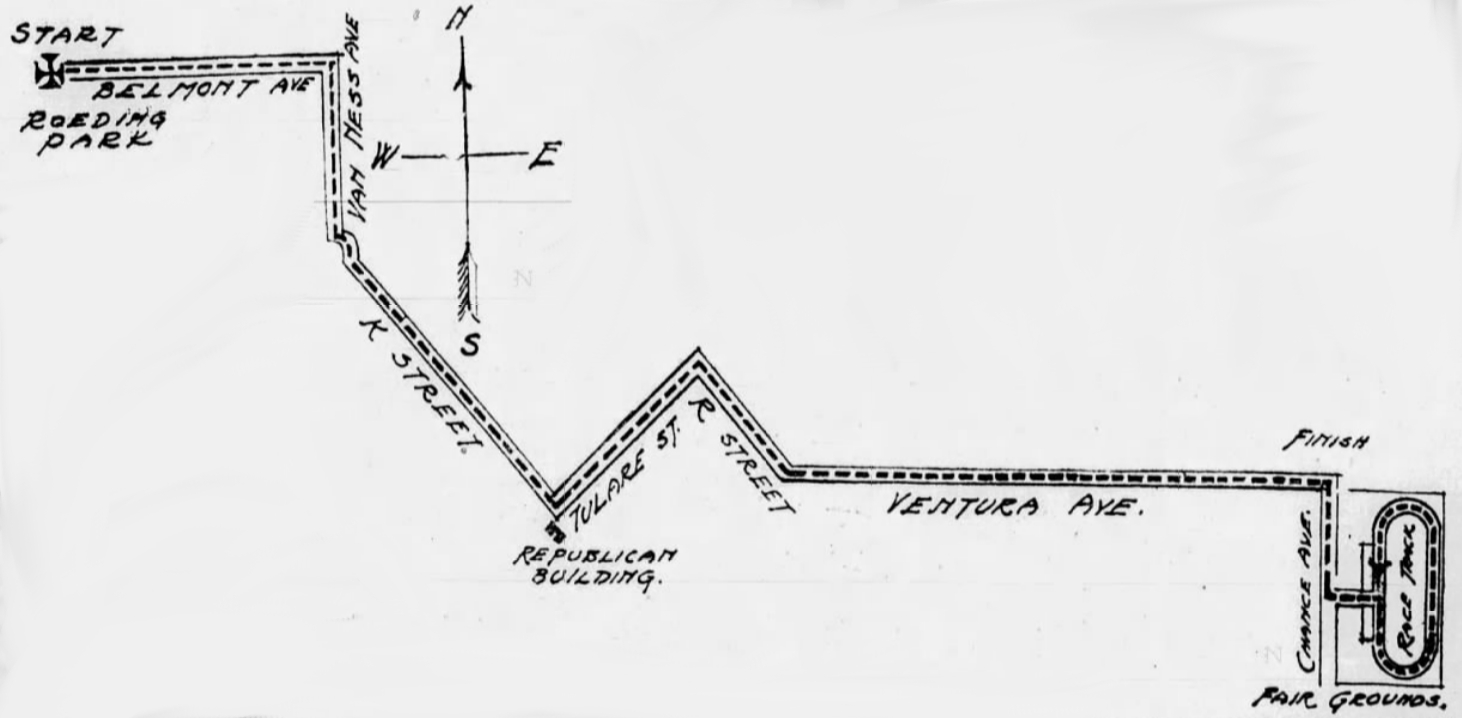
Mapped route of the 1914 Cross City Race, from Downtown Fresno to the fairgrounds

The fairgrounds property was bought by Fresno County in 1901 for $30,000 and a period of uncertainty and missed years of the fair followed. Management the fair was taken over by the Fresno County Agricultural Association which added stability but the organization still struggled to convince county supervisors to fund needed improvements to the fairgrounds and its facilities. A collective of local banks, churches, merchants associations and the chamber of commerce signed a petition asking for fairgrounds improvements and broke through the county's reluctance to spend. An agricultural exhibit building was completed in 1911, an industrial exhibit building was completed in 1912 and dynamic new secretary named Clyde Eberhart was hired. All this led to a decade of growth for the fair. A commerce building was completed in 1914 and the fair drew governor Hiram Johnson to attend as a guest of honor in 1916.

The 1914 Fair organized a unique kickoff event, a cross-city running race. The race starting line was in Roeding Park and it ended in a lap around the mile-long horse race track at the fairgrounds. Fifteen runners from around the state competed and Oliver Millard, of the San Francisco Olympic Club, won.

Historian Donald Marti credits the Big Fresno Fair for popularizing intentional train wrecks as a fair event spectacle across the US, an idea of Eberhart's. The first Fresno intentional train wreck was in 1919 and was attended by 35,000 people.

In 1919, both the Fresno District Fair organization and the California Raisin Association (the organizer of a popular annual spring festival) were disbanded as the result of a lawsuit and both groups were taken over by the Fresno Chamber of Commerce. In 1920, the Chamber made an agreement with Prince Speedway Construction Company, based in Los Angeles, to build an automobile track at the fairgrounds and to conduct two race per year there for a period of ten years in exchange for $50,000 and the majority of the earnings from the races.

The speedway was built out of 2x4 lumber placed on their sides and was regarded as one of the fastest tracks in the country. The first high level race it hosted was during the 1920 AAA Championship Car season. It continued to be a stop on the AAA racing circuit through the 1926 season. Multiple fires damaged the track but were repaired. The track succumbed to lawsuits and the pressure from newer speedways and was torn down in 1927.

In 1938, a reinforced concrete grandstand with 4,000 seats and a restaurant was built to replace the original Victorian-style turreted wood grandstand at the track. The last Fresno Fair before a seven-year hiatus was in 1941.

=== World War 2 and Fresno Assembly Center ===
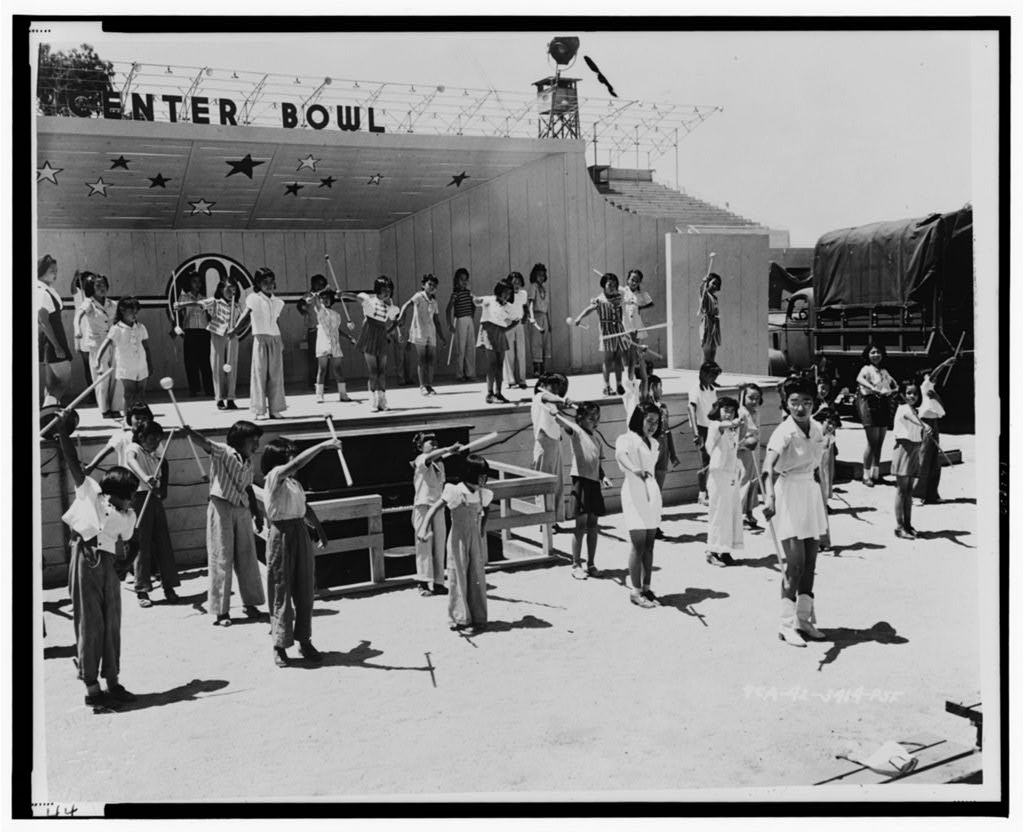
Temporary Detention Camp Japanese Americans at Fresno Assembly Centers during World War 2. Girls learning batons use

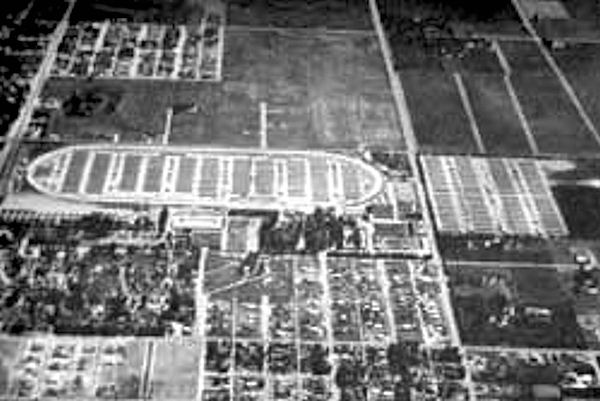
Fairgrounds used as Army training center

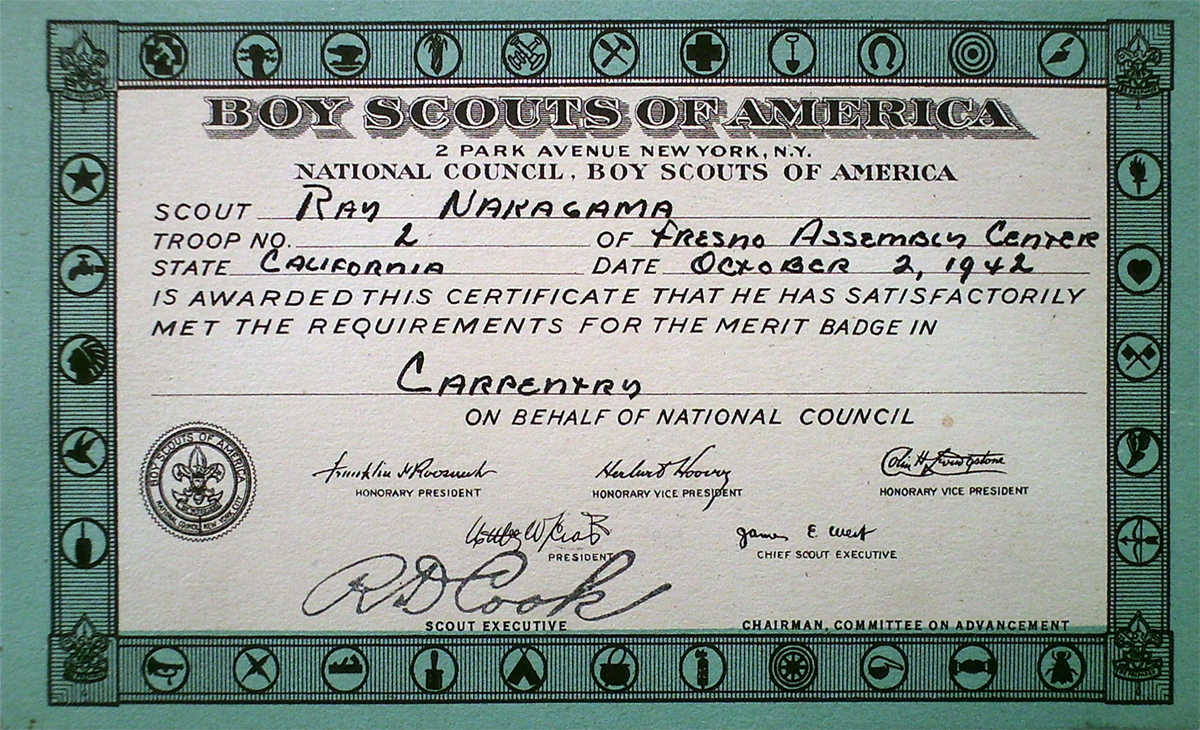
Fresno Assembly Center merit badge card for the Boy Scouts of America dated October 2, 1942. Recipient is actually named Roy Nakagawa, not Ray Nakagama

The Fresno Fairgrounds was the site of one of several temporary detention camps located throughout the West that represented the first phase of the mass incarceration of 97,785 Californians of Japanese ancestry during World War II. Pursuant to Executive Order 9066, thirteen makeshift detention facilities were constructed at various California racetracks, fairgrounds, and labor camps. These facilities were intended to confine Japanese Americans until more permanent internment camps could be built in isolated areas of the country, such as Manzanar and Tule Lake in California. Beginning on March 30, 1942, all native-born Americans and long-time legal residents of Japanese ancestry living in California were ordered to surrender themselves for detention. 5,344 Japanese Americans from Fresno and the surrounding area passed through the Fresno Assembly Center before being transferred to the Jerome War Relocation Center in Arkansas and Gila River, Arizona. California Historical Landmark #934 is a memorial dedicated to the more than 5,000 Americans of Japanese ancestry who were confined at the fairgrounds from May to October 1942. The marker is part of an expanded Fresno Assembly Center Memorial that lists in bronze the names of all who were incarcerated there with photos and personal commentaries by former Valley internees and their families. Banners highlighting photos from the era also educate visitors about the historical significance of the site.

When the Assembly Center closed, the fairgrounds became the Fresno Army Air Forces Training Center home of the Army Air Forces Basic Training Center No. 8. This was the United States Army Air Forces Fourth Air Force's non-flying training facility. At is peak it covered 300 acres for orientation and initial training of new forces. The Training Center closed on February 13, 1946.

=== State management ===
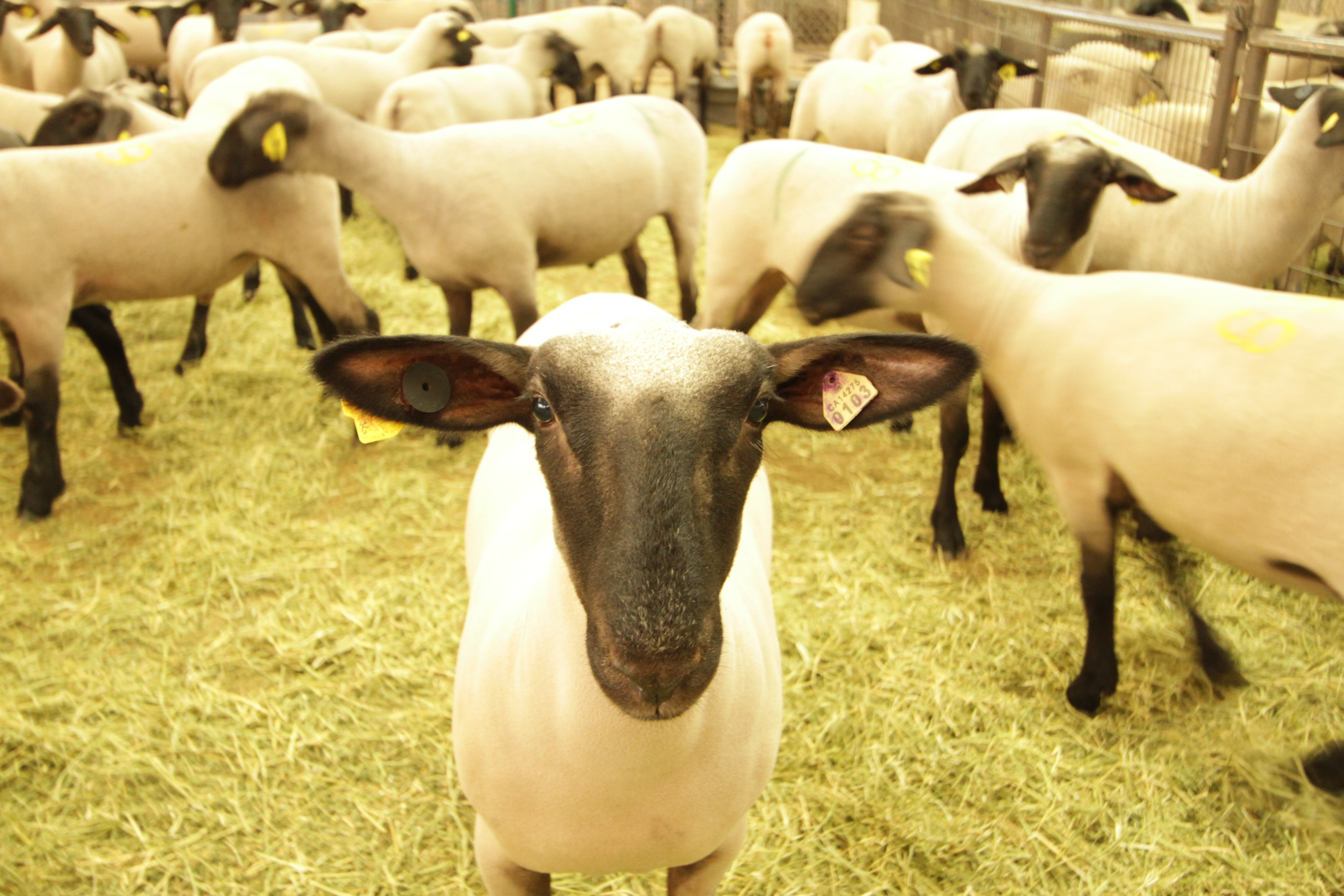
Livestock animal at The Big Fresno Fair

In 1948, the fair was reborn under the leadership of Tom Dodge and the State's 21st District Agricultural Association, but the Army's use of the fairgrounds had left them in disrepair. By 1953, both the agricultural and industrial exhibit buildings were razed due to the estimated cost to renovate them. New buildings were erected in their place.

The 1972 fair broke previous attendance records with 460,100 visitors.

A grandstand addition, as well as an expansion of the Paul Paul Theater, was completed in time for 1979 fair opening.

A lawsuit between a Fresno artist and the fair was filed after the 2015 fair barred his painting, depicting a confederate flag, from being displayed. The fair allowed the painting to be displayed at the 2016 fair and the state settled the lawsuit in the artist's favor.

Cell phone video of a brawl at the 2015 fair went viral on social media and led to increased police presence at future fairs. Fair patrollers include security guards, the Fresno Police and Fresno County Sheriff's Office.

Attendance for the 2019 fair was 632,590.

A virtual fair occurred in 2020 as the COVID-19 pandemic cancelled all live events & rides. A "drive through" fair was also offered.

== Facilities ==
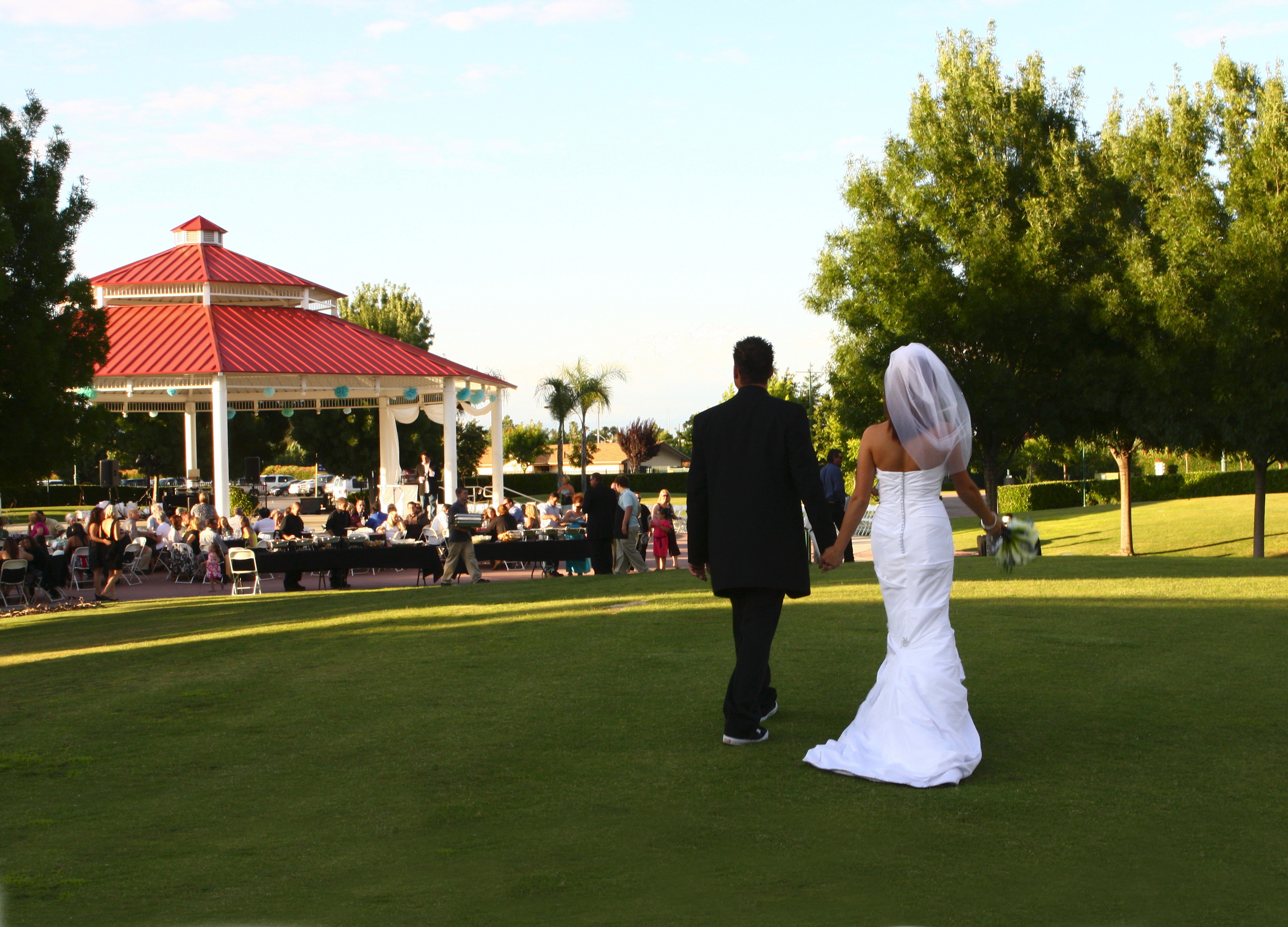
Wedding being performed in the Pavilion at the Fresno Fairgrounds

There are nine major exhibit buildings and the Table Mountain Rancheria Park and Pavilion amphitheater.

The visitors gate entrance on Chance Avenue was remodeled in 2004 due to $250,000 gift, the largest single contribution in the fair's history.

A statue dedicated to Fresno police chief and Mayor Jerry Dyer was unveiled in September 2019. The statue sits at Iron Mountain near the pavilion.

List of rental facilities at the Fresno Fairgrounds:

- Agriculture Building: 19,000 sq. ft. – 2,700 capacity
- Commerce Building: 25,000 sq. ft. – 3,871 capacity
- Fine Arts & Photography Building (Industrial Education): 11,000 sq. ft. – 1,571 capacity
- Gem & Mineral Building: 4,760 sq. ft. – 680 capacity
- Industry Commerce Building: 25,000 sq. ft. – 3,571 capacity
- Junior Exhibit Building: 20,000 sq. ft. – 2,858 capacity
- Livestock Pavilion
- Paul Paul Theater, formerly the Headliner Stage: 5,000 capacity
- Table Mountain Rancheria Park
- The Greenhouse: 21,063 sq. ft.
- Turf Club – Brian I. Tatarian Grandstand: 200 capacity

=== The Big Fresno Fair Museum and Fresno County Historical Museum ===
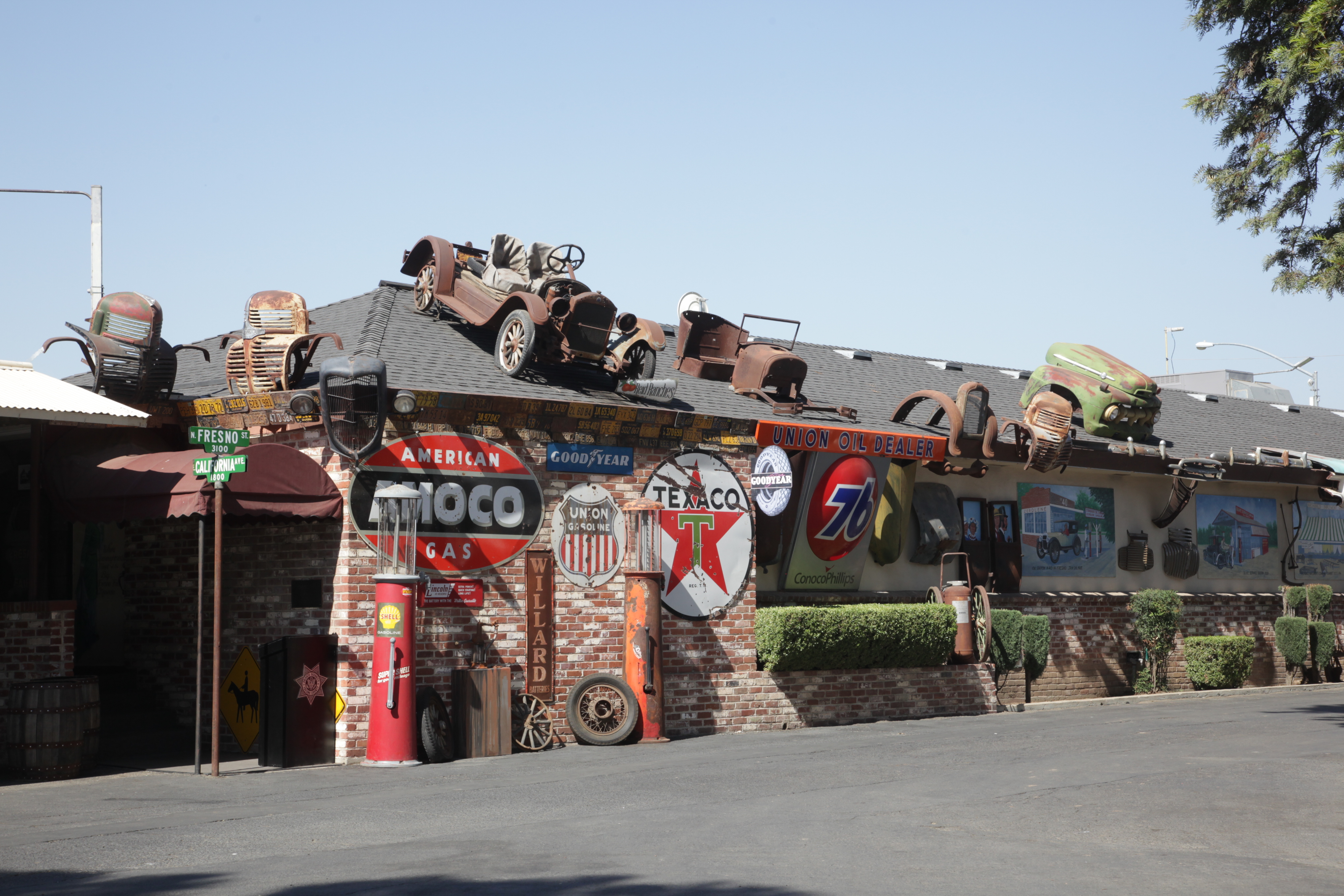
The Big Fresno Fair Museum

In 2013, The Big Fresno Fair opened the Big Fresno Fair Museum. Located in O'Neill Hall, the Museum features the history of The Big Fresno Fair, Fresno agriculture and the City of Fresno. It has more than 2,600 items, including an exhibit by American photographer Pop Laval. In 2014, a documentary-style video, Heritage Talks, was added to the museum that features an oral history from Building Superintendents, Boards of Directors, staff members, concessionaires, and horse racing enthusiasts In 2015, the museum expanded to include a new 14,000 square foot building which houses the Fresno County Historical Museum. In 2018, the History of Boxing exhibit was added.

== Horse racing ==
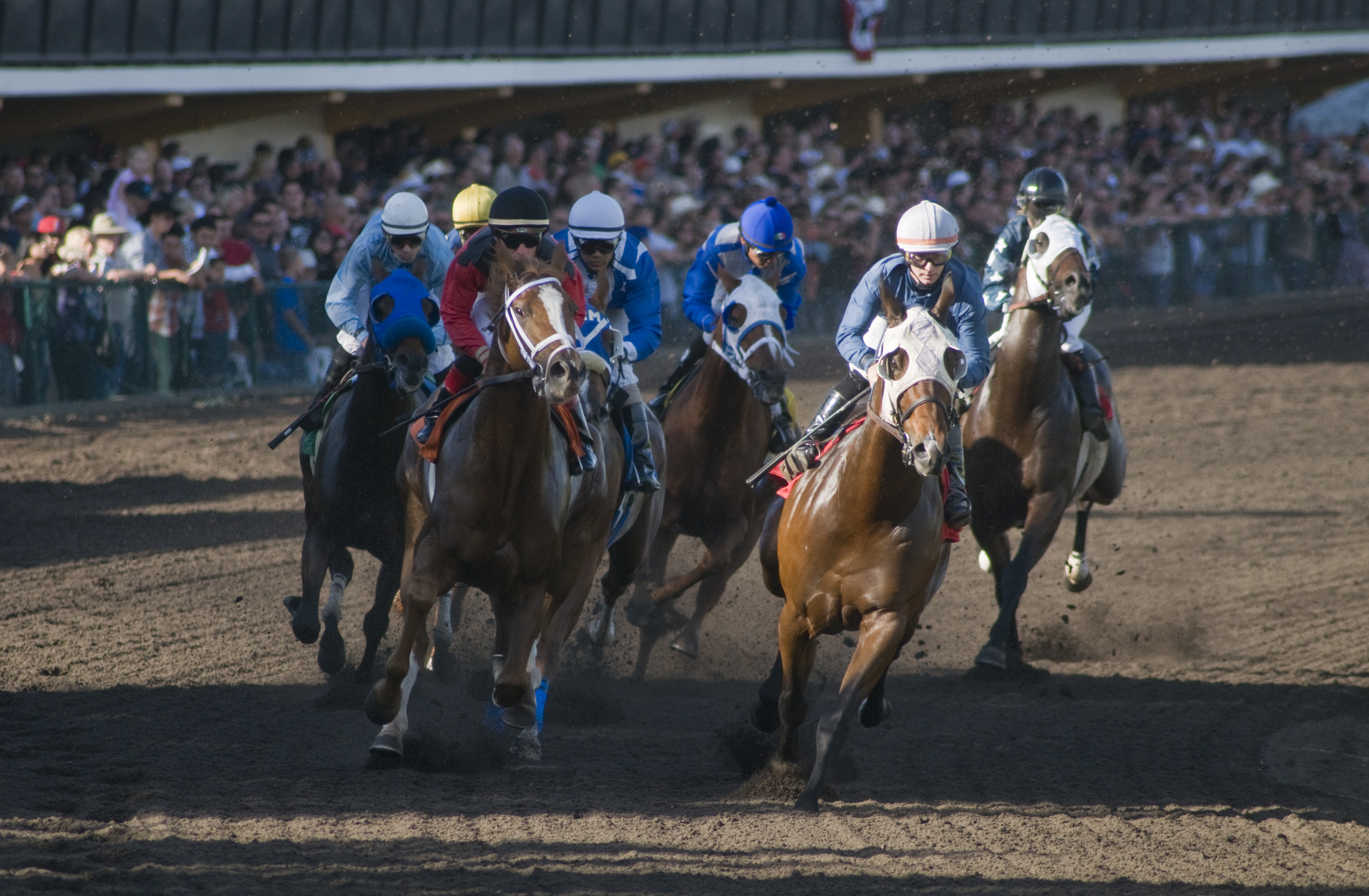
Horse racing at the fair

Horse racing has been held since the inaugural fair in 1884, which featured five days of racing between horses of farm owners from throughout the Valley.

The Big Fresno Fair's horse track is considered one of the fastest on the California racing circuit and draws more than 500 horses to compete during its racing days. In the past decade, more than $4 million has been invested in the horse racing facility including a complete remodel of the paddock and addition of a luxury deck to the Brian I. Tatarian Grandstand and planting of 6,100 trees.

The rest of the year, the Tatarian Grandstand hosts a satellite wagering facility (off-track betting) where people may bet on horse races taking place at tracks across the nation. The facility, called The Starting Gate, is open Thursday through Sunday year-round.

Champion racehorse California Chrome, born and raised in the Central Valley, was celebrated at the fair on October 11, 2014, in a special presentation between the horse races.

== Fairgrounds events ==
The Fresno Fairgrounds hosts more than 250 events per year including the Sun-Maid Kennel Club Dog Show, NoTown Roller Derby, the Fresno Home & Garden Shows and concerts.

Some key large annual events are:

- Flea Market & Swap Meet - Takes place every Thursday, Saturday and Sunday.
- Fresno Home Shows - The three annual shows feature a variety of home-based industries. The Fresno Home and Garden Show is held in the spring, The Fresno Home Remodeling and Decorating Show in the summer and The Fresno Fall Home Improvement Show in the fall.
- Hmong International New Year - The annual Hmong New Year celebration at the Fresno Fairgrounds brings more than 100,000 people from all over the world.

== Awards ==
Awards won by The Big Fresno Fair include the Merrill Award in 2007, 2011, 2013, 2015 and 2021 presented annually by the Western Fairs Association for innovation, vision, and excellence. The Fair is the recipient of the WFA Gold Star and Achievement Award numerous times. Former CEO John Alkire was inducted into the WFA Hall of Fame in 2010.

== Leadership ==
The district is self-funded through business operations and community contributions; it does not receive any funding from the State for operations. The district's budget is managed by a CEO and their and staff, and is overseen by a nine-member Board appointed by the Governor's office. The district derives its annual income from three main sources: the annual Big Fresno Fair, weekly satellite wagering and interim events. According to an independent report from 2002, The Big Fresno Fair contributes more than $68.6 million in economic impact to Fresno County annually.

Appointed by the Governor of California, board members serve a four-year term and can be reappointed after the conclusion of that term.

2022 Board of Directors:

- President – Chuck Riojas
- Vice President – Terry Gonsalves
- Secretary/Treasurer – Gary Chahil
- Board member – Linda Mae Balakian Hunsucker
- Board member – Frank Flores
- Board member – Jerry Pacheco
- Board member – Annalisa Perea
- Board member – Larry Salinas

The board hires a CEO to lead the management team. In 2022, Lauri King was selected as CEO. The fair also has a non-profit arm called Friends of the Big Fresno Fair, run by former fair CEO John Alkire, as of 2022.

== See also ==
- Bibliography of the Japanese American Internment during World War II
- Outline of Japanese American Internment during World War II
