= Pop Laval =

American photographer

- Born: Claude Constant Laval; November 8, 1882; New York City, New York
- Died: February 20, 1966 (aged 83); Fresno, California
- Occupation: Photographer

Claude Constant Laval I (November 8, 1882 – February 20, 1966), commonly known as Pop Laval, was an American photographer during the early 1900s who specialized in documenting California's San Joaquin Valley and Sierra Nevada mountains, particularly featuring Fresno. As a prolific photographer producing approximately one hundred thousand negatives, his 55-year legacy features people, and not just scenic photography. Pop Laval Foundation, run by Laval's great-granddaughter, Elizabeth Laval, is seeking to preserve and reintroduce Laval's work to students, history buffs and researchers. In pursuit of a career in photography, he invested in new equipment and began documenting various incidents with his camera. His photography also encompassed a wide variety of nature scenes.

== Biography ==
He was born on November 8, 1882, in New York City. In the early 1900s, he moved to Pennsylvania and from there to Fresno, California. He died on February 20, 1966, in Fresno, California.

== Legacy ==
Much of his career was spent with Ansel Adams, as they captured the essence of the Sierra Nevada mountains. Working with Adams taught him how to be meticulous in keeping ledgers and records of all of his photographs. These ledgers have proven to be a source of great insight into the development of California's Central Valley. Laval's photographs portray various aspects of life in the Central Valley, including but not limited to, agricultural practices, city-wide events, family gatherings, and even infrastructural change. As his career progressed, he became a pioneer in movie cameras, which thrust him into a media career. He worked with various news stations to broadcast events in the Central Valley to people throughout the world. Today, his negatives are in the process of being digitized in order to preserve the rich and diverse history of the Central Valley. An exhibit of his work is housed at the fairgrounds of The Big Fresno Fair.
