= Rex Parker =

American crossword blogger (born 1969)

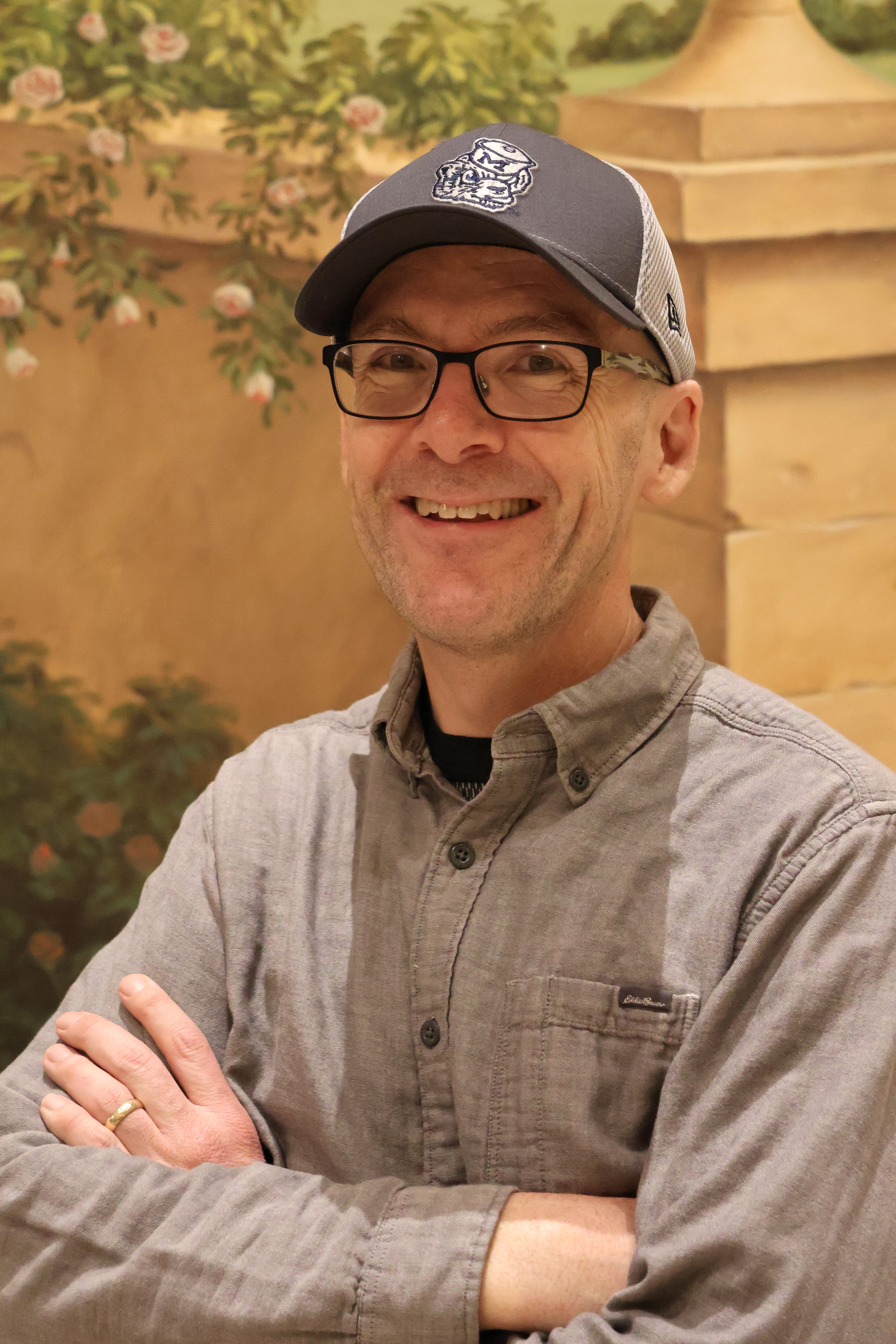
- Sharp in 2025
- Born: Michael David Sharp; November 26, 1969 (age 56)
- Education: Pomona College (BA); University of Michigan (MA, PhD)
- Occupations: Blogger; lecturer of English at Binghamton University
- Known for: Rex Parker Does the NYT Crossword Puzzle
- Website: rexwordpuzzle.blogspot.com

Michael David Sharp (born November 26, 1969), known by the pseudonym Rex Parker, is an American blogger known for writing about the New York Times crossword puzzle on his blog, Rex Parker Does the NYT Crossword Puzzle. Sharp teaches English at Binghamton University in New York.

== Early life, education, and career ==
Sharp grew up in Fresno, California. He went to Pomona College as an undergraduate and earned his PhD in English from the University of Michigan in 1999. He became interested in crossword puzzles in his senior year of college in 1990. While in graduate school, he often solved crosswords in free newspapers found in cafés.

Sharp joined the English department of Binghamton University in 1999. He has taught classes on medieval literature, crime fiction, and comic books. He used to teach occasionally at Elmira Correctional Facility.

== Blogging ==
Sharp began writing about the daily New York Times crossword puzzle as practice for a possible website for a comics course. He writes under a pseudonym—Rex Parker, King of CrossWorld—that was originally a nickname invented during a family trip to Hawaii; his real-life identity was outed in 2007. Five weeks after its inception on September 25, 2006, the blog received hundreds of views when the first puzzles he had written about were reprinted in national syndication. Two years later, there were more than 10,000 daily readers, more than 20,000 in 2012, and 50,000 in 2021. Some readers regularly participate in the blog's comment section, which forms a part of the online crossword community.

Sharp usually solves the Times puzzle in the late evening and writes posts in the morning before going to work. His reviews are known for use of humor and strong opinions. He generally expresses his likes or dislikes of elements such as a puzzle's theme, clues, fill, and fairness. Posts additionally include the puzzle's solution, a difficulty rating, an explanation of the theme (Sunday–Thursday), a "word of the day", and topical pictures and music. In 2008, he invented on his blog the crossword term "natick" (after Natick, Massachusetts) for an "unguessable" square crossed in both directions by proper nouns considered obscure. He has sometimes criticized the Times puzzle on issues of gender and racial representation. Crossword editor Will Shortz has said he has "mixed feelings" about the blog, and the Times's "Wordplay" column has called it "decidedly divisive" for its occasionally caustic tone. Sharp has framed the blog as an effort to treat an ephemeral product as a creative work worthy of criticism.

Sharp has competed in the American Crossword Puzzle Tournament, placing as high as 31st in 2011. In 2025, he won the pairs division with his wife. He used to test solve puzzles for the Times for some time before 2009. He has constructed several crosswords published in the Times, The Wall Street Journal, and the Los Angeles Times since 2010.

Sharp writes another blog, Pop Sensation, cataloguing his vintage paperback novel collection, begun in March 2007.
