= Radagun =

American pop band

- Origin: Fresno, California, USA
- Genres: Pop, rock
- Years active: 2008–2012
- Label: Independent – Girl Friday
- Members: Aimee Ortiz, Todd Low
- Website: www.radagun.com

Radagun is an American pop band based in Jacksonville, Florida, consisting of former husband and wife Todd Low and Aimee Ortiz and is occasionally accompanied by additional live performers. In March 2009 Radagun released the single "Runaway" from their debut album Life Lessons. The album created enough buzz to land them a page in Alternative Press Magazine, and the video for "Runaway" was picked up for rotation by over 40 outlets most notably including Fuse TV, MTV Latin America, and Billboard.com. Lead singer Aimee Ortiz also received a sponsorship from Daisy Rock Guitars and is featured on their artists page. Radagun's song Party Girl, off their Life Lessons album was featured in an episode of The Bad Girls Club on April 18, 2011.

== History ==
The band had beginnings in Fresno, California. The band's core members Aimee Ortiz and Todd Low established Radagun in September 2008 and the band went through several member changes during their first year until finally settling on the idea of a two-person band with live performers filling in occasionally. The band quickly gained distinction in the local music scene from a fierce promotional campaign for their first live performance.

Radagun's first performance as a band was on the Fresno television show Great Day which aired on KMPH Fox 26 on January 30, 2009. The station received positive feedback from their performance, and the band used the show to plug their upcoming CD release show. The band also aired TV commercials during The Simpsons and George Lopez among other shows, the entire week of their first live performance and arranged to raffle off a guitar at the show with the help of sponsor GuitarItUp. On March 6, 2009 Radagun released their debut album, Life Lessons, and headlined their first show just ten people shy of a sold-out crowd, immediately ranking them among the elite in Fresno's music scene. In May 2009 Radagun was featured in Alternative Press Magazine, issue #250.

In June 2009 founding members Aimee Ortiz and Todd Low began speaking with producer Zack Odom about recording in Atlanta, Georgia. It was decided that the band would move to the east coast in order to further their career. Upon arriving in Jacksonville, Florida, Radagun immediately made an impact on the Jacksonville music scene. In March 2010 they booked a nationwide tour stopping back in their hometown of Fresno, California at the historic Tower Theater.

== Public service ==
On November 6, 2009 Radagun performed on Action News At 6 on CBS 47 WTEV Jacksonville to promote their performance at Rock For Kids 09, a benefit concert held at The Jacksonville Landing in Jacksonville, Florida for Prevent Child Abuse Florida and the Ounce of Prevention Fund of Florida. Radagun donated an Alchemy guitar which was auctioned off at the event raising $250 for the organizations.

== Band members ==
- Aimee Ortiz - Born September 25, 1981 in Pasadena, California.
- Todd Low - Born December 10, 1982 in Orlando, Florida.
