= Martin Theodore Kearney =

Californian agriculturist (1842 – 1906)

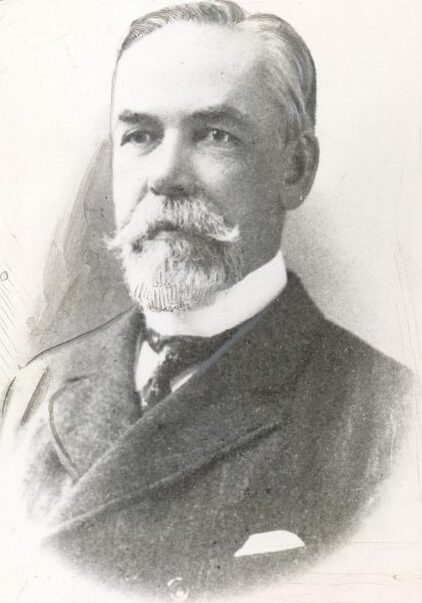
- Martin Theodore Kearney at age 61
- Born: February 5, 1842; Liverpool, England
- Died: May 27, 1906 (aged 64)
- Resting place: Chapel Of The Light Mausoleum; 36.750620°N 119.830390°W
- Other names: Prince of Fresno; Raisin King of California; Raisin Boss

Martin Theodore Kearney (1842–1906), also known as M.T. Kearney or M. Theo Kearney, was a nineteenth century English immigrant to the United States and a pioneer land developer. In a biography of Kearney, Rehart and Patterson referred to him as "one of the most powerful and prosperous agricultural leaders in the state of California."

== Early life ==
While alive, Kearney was very secretive about his early life; facts about it were gleaned later from his notebooks and from public records.

Martin Theodore Kearney was born on February 5, 1842, in Liverpool, England, to James and Ann Carney, both of Irish heritage. His brother, James, was born two years later. The family immigrated to the United States in 1854, and settled in Malden, Massachusetts, a small community about ten miles north of Boston. The family name was changed from a "C" spelling to a "K" spelling after arriving.

In c. 1860, Kearney left Malden at age eighteen to seek employment in Boston. He found work as a clerk in a trunk manufacturing company run by Nathan and Samuel Neat, and rose to a sales position and then a managerial position in 1866. During this time, Kearney took lessons in German, French, elocution and dancing and sought to educate himself as much as possible in the ways and manners of genteel society. He made powerful friends in California, New York and Europe.

According to his notebooks, Julie Barker began to figure prominently in his life around 1866. References to her continued for two years until stopping in the early months of 1868. This coincided with Kearney's abrupt decision in 1868 to leave Boston for a new life in California.

The decision to leave for California was also likely due his business connection to William Smith Chapman. Chapman was a land speculator and mining investor from Ohio who utilized federally issued agricultural land scrips to obtain hundreds of thousands of acres of public land in California. Kearney had the intention of becoming a land agent and promoter for Chapman and his land holdings.

== California and raisin farming ==
=== Central California Colony ===
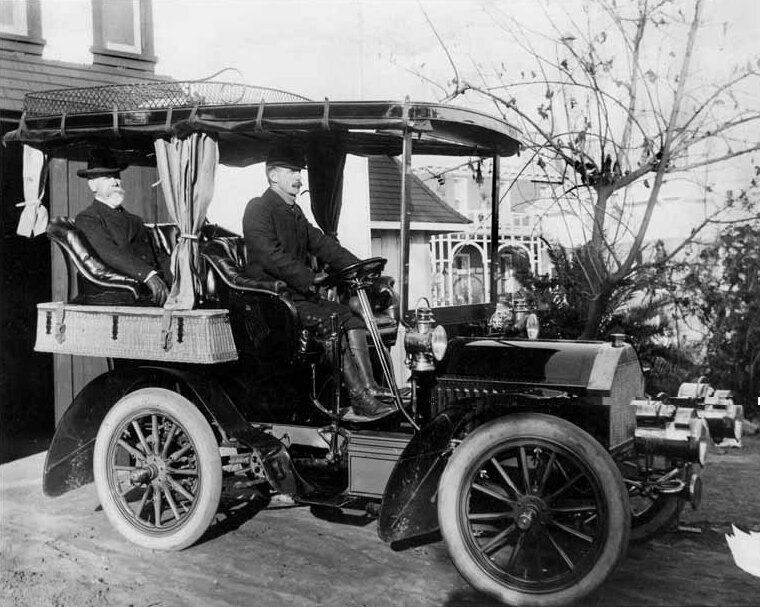
M. Theo Kearney and his driver

Traveling by steamer and the overland railroad route across the Isthmus of Panama, Kearney arrived in San Francisco in February 1869. By 1871 he had already made several land purchases, including 8,640 acres (3,500 ha) from a man whom he met on the steamer trip west, Dr. Edward B. Perrin. He also bought 1,000 acres (400 ha) five miles west of present-day downtown Fresno.

Due to the lack of development, land values were highly dependent on the Central Pacific Railroad's final decisions for routing and placement of a station in the area. The railroad ultimately established their station in April 1872 at what is now Tulare and H streets. Soon, there was a store near the station and the store grew into the town of Fresno Station, later called Fresno. The land Kearney bought from Dr. Perrin was fertile but it was further away from the new railroad depot than he anticipated and he sold this land for a loss. The land closer to Fresno Station proved more valuable. The land also became more valuable once Moses J. Church completed a canal system in 1872, turning the sand desert into arable agricultural land.

Kearney lived in San Francisco while dealing in real estate and developing business connections including Thomas E. Hughes, a man who had extensive investments in the farm land around Fresno, and Bernhard Marks, a one-time school teacher who had unsuccessfully invested in mining stocks. Marks believed the way to make farming profitable in California was through creating a colony of small farms, each with permanent residents who would be self-sufficient and stable. Kearney supported Marks' idea and the two worked to make it a reality. Kearney asked a skeptical William S. Chapman for help obtaining investors and he obliged, bringing in San Francisco capitalists and local Fresno area backers.

In 1875, Chapman appointed Kearney the manager and chief promoter of the scheme, which they named Central California Colony. It was situated south of Fresno on 6 square miles (16 km^{2}) of land. This translated to 192 twenty-acre lots, each of which included a two‐acre vineyard of grapevines imported from Spain. Each lot sold for $1,000 with purchase terms of $150 down and $12.50 per month, interest free, until the debt was paid. Fencing and irrigation for the lots were provided cooperatively and each of the Colony's avenues was shaded with trees to match the street name. The concept was to enable middle-class buyers to start farming without the large financial outlay otherwise necessary.

Although the colonists faced numerous hardships, including disputes over water rights, the Colony flourished and served as a model for numerous other colony ventures. Kearney's salesmanship and business acumen stimulated much of the success of Central California Colony, and they sold most of the lots within a year of establishment.

=== Fruit Vale Estate ===
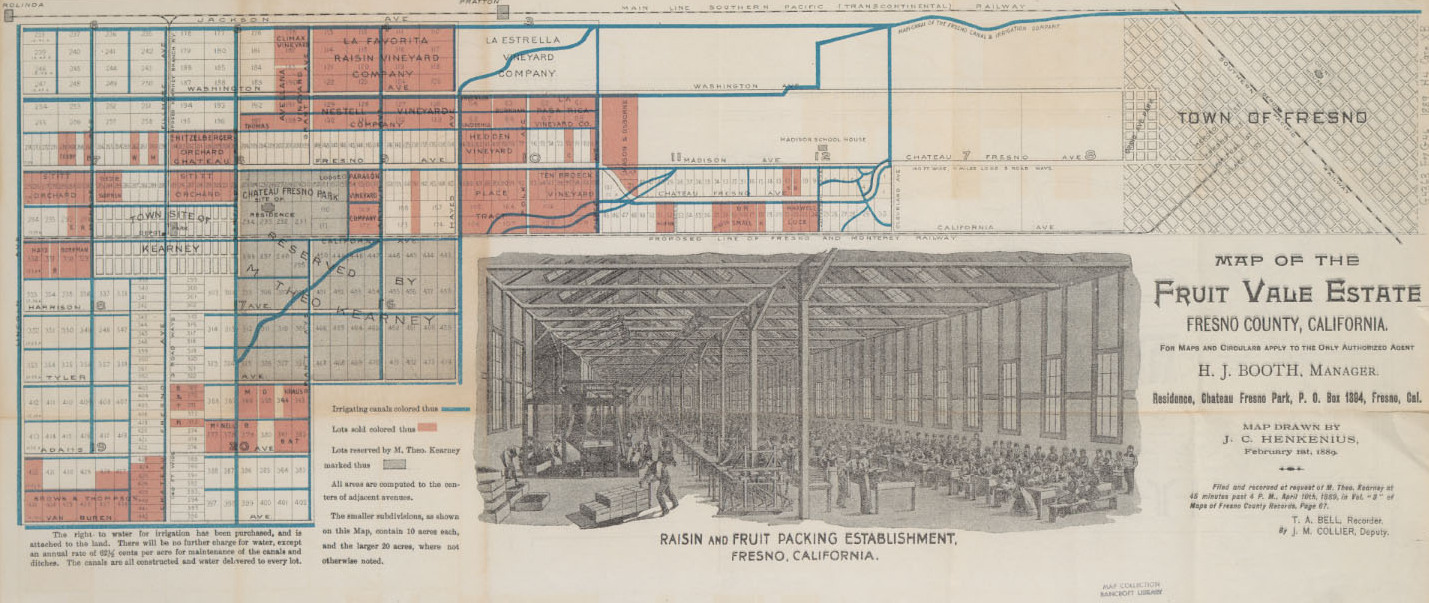
Map of the Fruit Vale Estate in 1889

Kearney looked to replicate the success of the Central California Colony with himself as the primary developer rather than William S. Chapman. He purchased 6,800 acres (2,800 ha) west of Fresno in 1883, calling it the Fruit Vale Estate. Similar to the Central California Colony, Kearney split the estate into ten and twenty-acre lots for individuals to purchase, but took a different approach in some ways, integrating agricultural land that he directly owned into the colony. He also envisioned an 11 miles (18 km) avenue in "the French style" leading to his estate. He believed that such improvements would "have a marked influence on attracting...people of taste, and of means to indulge their taste, who will purchase land and create beautiful homes thereon."

Finding investors for his Fruit Vale Estate project took almost four years, and involved a lengthy trip to Europe. Kearney contacted his business connections in San Francisco and New York but was unsuccessful. He traveled to Europe, visiting England, France and Germany and negotiated with a Scottish capitalist, Captain George C. Cheape, a man who had previously invested in the Perrin-Church Canal in the Fresno area. Cheape gave Kearney money and Kearney returned to California, beginning his project. By 1889, he was ready to sell individual lots and advertised Fresno County far and wide. He promoted his colony using brochures that described Fresno as a veritable Garden of Eden.

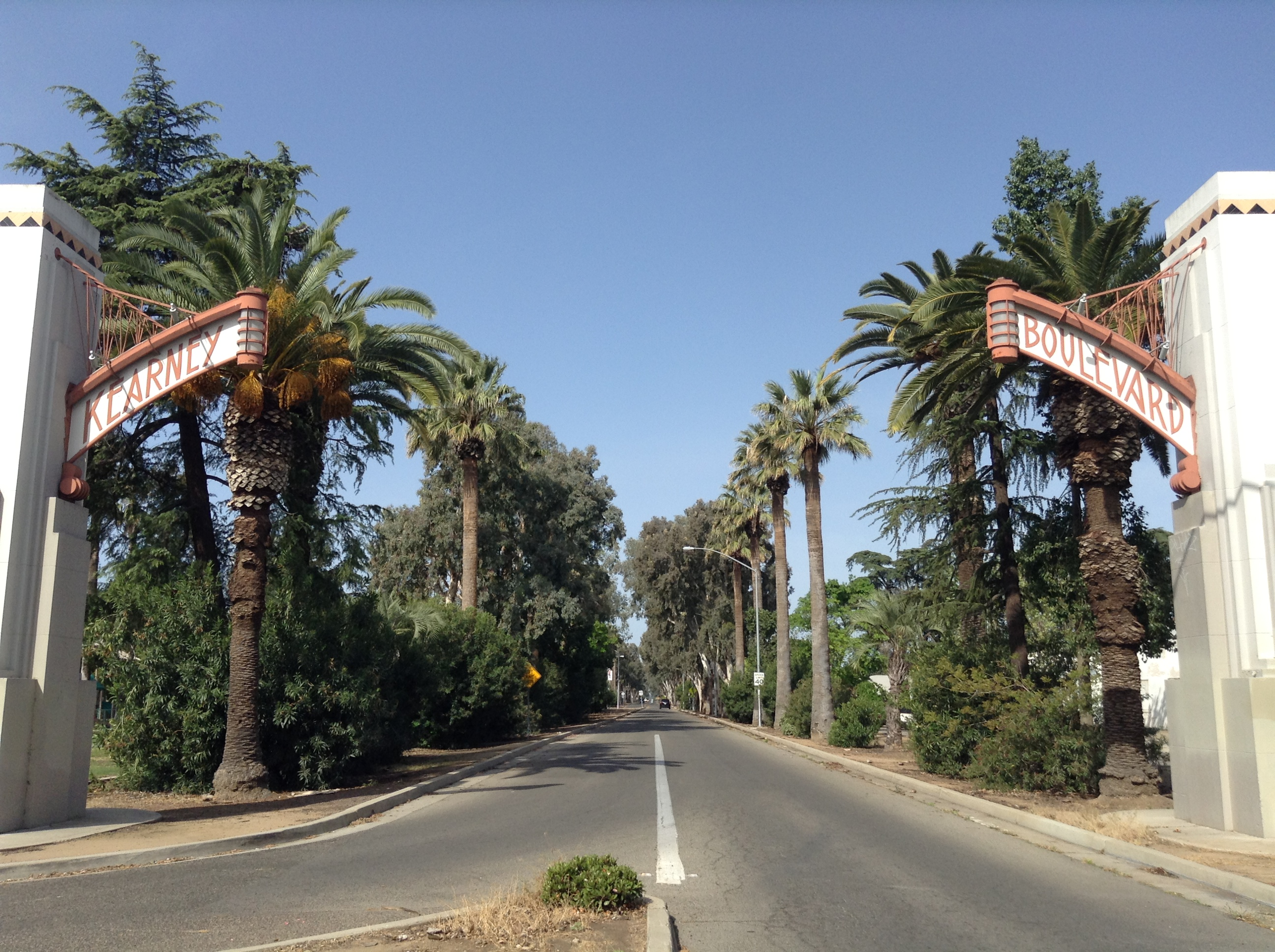
Palm tree-lined Kearney Boulevard

Kearney reserved an area in the middle of the estate to serve as his own residence and as a center for the community, a sort of ranch town or headquarters, including a general store, livestock barns, a dairy, a post office, a bell tower and other structures.

The French-style avenue leading to his estate, now called Kearney Boulevard, was completed in 1892 and was a triple road with a wide central lane for light carriages, a northern lane for wagons, and a southern lane for equestrians and bicyclists. The landscape design alternated eucalyptus and palms with pink and white oleanders planted beneath for color. The avenue runs from east to west and has been described as one of the most "striking drives in all California".

=== Market crash ===
Kearney was successful in drawing people to purchase and farm his estate lots. However, the 1880s caused a rapid proliferation of raisin farmers and raisin producing acreage, leading to a glutted market. Fresno county farm statistics provided a picture that foretold the overproduction. The county had 15,863 acres of land in raisin vineyards in 1890, and by 1893, the figure had more than doubled to 38,594 acres.

The climax of this economic slump was dubbed the "Panic of 1893" when the stock and commodities markets crashed. Many estate residents defaulted on their payments and were unable to meet the twelve percent compound interest penalty for such defaults.

Making the decision to foreclose on residents who couldn't pay and take back the entire land with improvements earned Kearney much resentment from the community. Many Fresnans came to see Kearney as a cold, ruthless landlord who had little sympathy for the small growers. His ongoing feud with the local paper did not help.

Kearney himself took large financial losses in the crash and came out of it convinced the raisin industry as a whole needed to find new markets and to better control product quality. He gained back control of many acres of vineyards at his Fruit Vale Estate and planted alfalfa on the rest of the available acres.

=== Raisin Growers Association ===
Efforts to establish a raisin cooperative in California had failed until April 1898. Looking to bring more order to the raisin industry, Kearney, along with 22 others, met to devise a plan for organization. Kearney proposed a raisin pooling plan for organization while another man proposed a capitalized plan. Kearney's plan won via a vote and he was elected president of the association.

Kearney received unanimous support in the beginning, but differences of opinion as to policies soon developed. Kearney's intolerance of opposition forced these differences into factions of "Kearneyites" and "Anti-Kearneyites.". Kearney resigned as president many times and one year was "literally hooted out of the hall." But the following year was almost unanimously elected as president again.

The Raisin Grower Association disbanded immediately after Kearney's death. However, raisin production continued to be a hallmark of the Fresno area, and Sun-Maid, established as the California Associated Raisin Company in 1912, in large part continued what Kearney and the Raisin Grower Association began. Sun-Maid has continued as a privately owned cooperative of raisin growers, headquartered in Fresno, into the 21st century.

== Death and estate ==
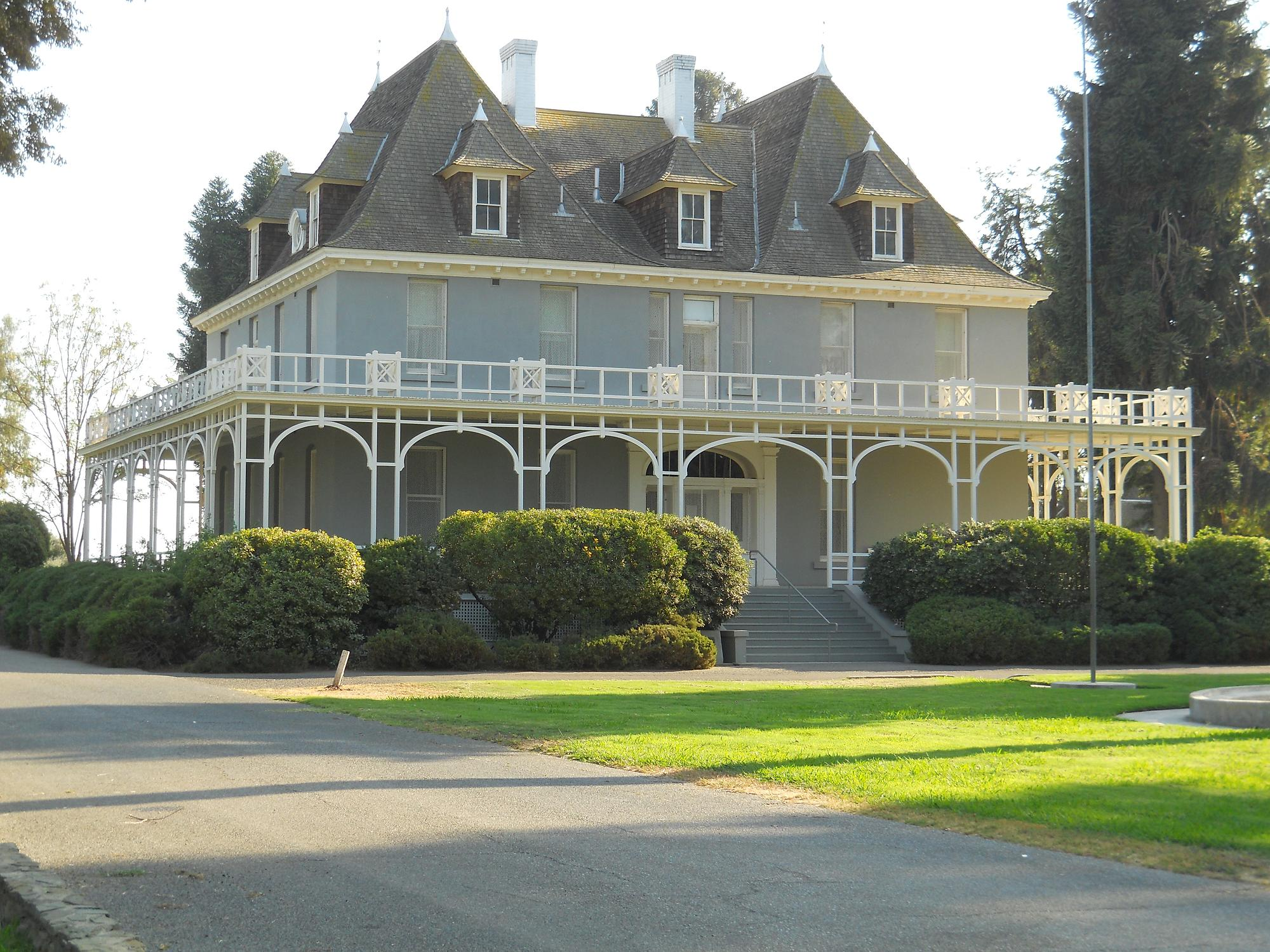
Kearney Park and Mansion in 2014

Kearney had been in ill health for quite a few years, and believed that spending time in the arid central valley made his health worse. He was in San Francisco during the great 1906 earthquake and subsequent fires and avoided any injury, and was shaken up by it.

He died at age 64 while traveling to Bad Nauheim in Germany, a place he believed has healing powers, while aboard a luxury liner named Caronia. Kearney's remains were cremated in Liverpool, England and the ashes were returned to his Fresno estate. In 1929, the ashes were moved from his mansion to be interred in Fresno's Chapel of Light Mausoleum.

In Kearney's final will, he gifted the Fruit Vale Estate to the University of California, asking them to establish an experimental station as part of the university's College of Agriculture. The probate court approved the distribution of Kearney's estate, including Kearney Park and Kearney Mansion, to the University of California in June 1910. During the proceedings, San Francisco labor leader Denis Kearney attempted to prove he was Kearney's first cousin and collect an inheritance but the court denied him. The estate was also sued for payment on services rendered on the unfinished Chateau Fresno construction project.

After the university assumed ownership of the Fruit Vale Estate, it continued as a ranch and farm. It was operated by Ralph Frisselle, Kearney's original superintendent, until his death in 1912. Friselle's son, Samuel, managed the property from 1912 until the end of university ownership in 1949. By 1949 the university had sold all the land except for the community center (Kearney's mansion and the surrounding park). It was leased to Fresno County for $1 per year, effectively turning over ownership. The university established the M. Theo Kearney Foundation of Soil Science in 1951, to honor of Kearney's request. The purpose of the foundation is to support research on soils, plant nutrition, and water science.

Since the county took over, it has become a public park, named Kearney Park, with picnic areas, ball fields and a disc golf course. In 1962, the Fresno Historical Society agreed to operate the mansion and park as a museum. The site was added to the National Register of Historic Places in 1975.

Kearney Boulevard is currently an east–west thoroughfare, connecting downtown Fresno to the city of Kerman, 15 miles (24 km) to the west. His name also became attached to the Kearney Bowl, a Fresno racetrack in operation from 1938 to 1970.

== See also ==
- Timeline of Fresno, California
- Kearney Park (Fresno)
