= Frank Hamilton Short =

American lawyer

Frank H. Short was a well-known advocate of states' rights in the early 20th century.

Frank Hamilton Short (September 12, 1862 - June 5, 1920) was a Fresno, California, lawyer and a states' rights advocate within the early American Conservation movement.

== Biography ==
Soon after Short's birth in Shelby County, Missouri, his father died from drinking poisoned water while engaged in the American Civil War. Short and his mother moved to Fresno, California in 1881. After a brief stint as a school teacher in Ahwanee, California, Short was, at age 22, elected justice of the peace in Fresno County.

Admitted to the bar in 1887, Short became an accomplished trial lawyer. Later, he changed his practice to represent companies in the oil, water, and natural resources industries. Short was involved in the California Bar Association, a voluntary organization that predated the mandatory State Bar of California that was established in 1927. He was president of the statewide organization in 1918. He also had been president of the Fresno County Bar Association in 1899, 1912, and 1913.

In 1899, Governor Henry Gage appointed Short to the State Board of Commissioners for the preservation of Yosemite Valley. Short was an avid hiker and explorer of the Sierra Nevada.

Short was nationally known for his advocacy for states' rights and the private development of natural resources. He attended several national public lands and conservation conferences and was a speaker at the National Conservation Congress held in St. Paul, Minnesota in September 1910, as were President William Taft, former President Theodore Roosevelt, and conservationist Gifford Pinchot. Later, Short teamed with former California governor James N. Gillett to lobby Congress on similar issues.

A lifelong Republican, Short unsuccessfully ran in 1888 for Fresno County district attorney. He was a delegate to the Republican National Conventions in St. Louis, Missouri in 1896 and in Chicago, Illinois in 1904, where he was on the sub-committee that drafted the party platform. In 1912 he actively campaigned for the re-election of President Taft in opposition to Progressive Party candidate Theodore Roosevelt. Short ran for a seat in the California State Senate in 1906, but lost by fewer than 400 votes. He was mentioned as a possible candidate for California governor in 1902, and as a United States Senate candidate in 1904.

In 1911, he challenged former President Roosevelt at the Commonwealth Club in San Francisco, California, again on the issue of the Western States' rights to develop federal lands. In his argument, Short used a metaphor of Uncle Sam having four sons, East, North, South, and West. Uncle Sam transferred to his three oldest sons, East, North, and South, all their share of his estate. Then after the youngest brother began to show the real value of the left-over portion of their father's estate, the older brothers began to look with covetous eyes upon their younger brother's inheritance. Then the elder brothers complained to Uncle Sam that he should not have given them the land and to atone for his mistake, he should hold the younger brother's share for the benefit of all four of them. Short later published a written rebuttal to President Roosevelt's Commonwealth Club speech.
