= Harry Dixon (metalsmith) =

American metalsmith (1890–1967)

- Born: Harry St. John Dixon Jr. June 22, 1890 near Fresno, California, U.S.
- Died: September 4, 1967 (aged 77); Santa Rosa, California, U.S.
- Education: California College of the Arts
- Occupations: Metalsmith, jewelry designer, sculptor, educator
- Movement: Arts and Crafts movement, Modernism
- Spouse(s): Margery Wheelock (m. 1916–?; div.); Florence Marguerite Fullmer (m. 1953–1967; his death)
- Children: 2
- Father: Harry St. John Dixon
- Relatives: Maynard Dixon (brother)

Harry St. John Dixon Jr. (June 22, 1890 – September 4, 1967) was an American metalsmith, jewelry designer, sculptor, and educator in San Francisco and Santa Rosa, California. He is known for his work in copper, and his modernist jewelry.

== Early life, family, and education ==
Harry St. John Dixon Jr. was born on June 22, 1890, on a ranch near Fresno, California. He was the son of Constance (née Maynard) and Henry "Harry" St. John Dixon. His father was a former Confederate officer turned rancher and lawyer. His family was of aristocratic Virginia Confederates that had found a new home in California after the American Civil War. He was the youngest of eight siblings, which included brother Maynard Dixon. Their family initially moved in 1891 to Alameda, California, followed by a move to San Francisco, and in 1902 a move to Sausalito, California.

Dixon attended the newly opened School of the California Guild of Arts and Crafts (now California College of the Arts) in Berkeley, California starting in spring 1909. He apprenticed coppersmithing under Dirk van Erp Sr. in Oakland, California; and in the summers he studied under Isabel Percy West and took jewelry classes.

In 1916, Dixon married Margery Wheelock, and they had two children. The Wheelock marriage ended in divorce. He remarried in 1953 to Florence Marguerite Fullmer, who worked in jewelry and metal crafts after their marriage.

== Career ==
For six years he worked at Lillian McNeill Palmer's Palmer Copper Shop in San Francisco, making custom wrought iron light fixtures. In 1912, Dixon started teaching at his alma mater, the California College of the Arts. He used natural design motifs in his early metal artwork, which was influenced by the Arts and Crafts movement.

During World War I, Dixon joined the National Guard with the coastal artillery. However he was given an honorable discharge because he was poor at calculating the artillery trajectory. After his leave he worked at Union Iron Works, a shipyard company in San Francisco, for 18 months doing heavy labor. He returned to the Union Iron Works shipyard during World War II, when he was already in his 50s.

After World War I, Dixon opened his own metal shop on Tillman Place in San Francisco, and resumed teaching at the California College of the Arts. He continued working within the Arts and Crafts movement after war, and continued after the period of the movement. In 1940, Dixon joined the San Francisco Art Students League. Dixon was an early member of the Metal Arts Guild of San Francisco. He was president of the Coppersmith Union Local 438, AFL San Francisco, from 1943 until 1945.

In the 1953, Dixon and his second wife moved to Santa Rosa, California and opened a metal shop at 849 West College Avenue. The City of Santa Rosa commissioned Dixon for a public sundial memorial for Luther Burbank. Dixon was also commissioned for the large metal cross at St. Luke Lutheran Church in Santa Rosa.

He served as an instructor at the Mendocino Art Center in 1962, and taught metal arts at Pond Farm near Guerneville, California. Notable students of Dixon's include C. Carl Jennings.

Dixon died on September 4, 1967, at his home in Santa Rosa.
