= Harry St. John Dixon =

American Confederate officer, lawyer, rancher (1848–1898)

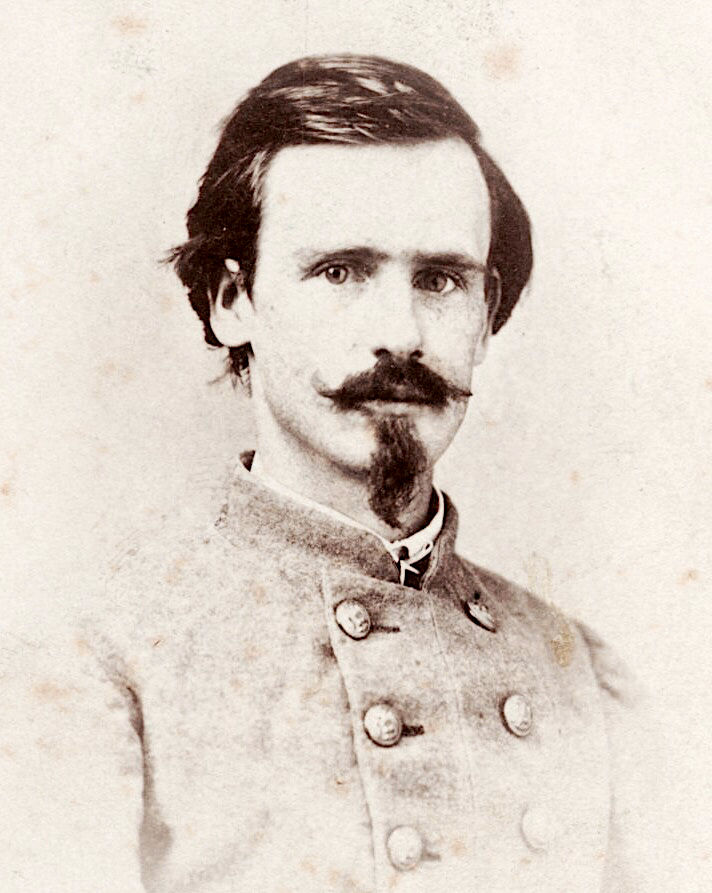
- Born: Henry St. John Dixon; August 2, 1848; Jackson, Mississippi, U.S.
- Died: August 27, 1898 (aged 50); Fresno, California, U.S.
- Burial place: Mountain View Cemetery, Fresno, California, U.S.
- Education: University of Virginia
- Spouse: Constance Maynard (m.1874–1898; his death)
- Children: 9, including Maynard Dixon, and Harry Dixon

Harry St. John "H.S." Dixon (August 2, 1848 – August 27, 1898) was an American lawyer, military officer, and cattle rancher. He served as a Confederate States Army officer, and was the founder of the Constantine Chapter in the Psi Chapter of Sigma Chi. Dixon was an early resident of Madera County, California and later the San Joaquin Valley.

== Early life, and education ==
Henry "Harry" St. John Dixon was born in August 2, 1848, in Jackson, Mississippi, and he was raised on his family's Sycamore Plantation in Washington County. His parents were Julia Ann Rebecca Phillips, and Judge Richard Lawrence Dixon.

He attended from 1860 to 1861 the University of Virginia in Richmond, Virginia. He joined the Sigma Chi fraternity while in university.

== Civil war and the Constantine Chapter ==
Dixon enlisted on December 10, 1861 as a private in the Confederate States Army in the 11th Mississippi Infantry Regiment (company H) in Virginia, however days after he became violently ill and took a break to return home. On April 29, 1862, he re-joined the Confederate States Army in the 28th Mississippi Cavalry Regiment (company D) in Richmond, Virginia. By May 1863, Dixon became sick again, and was sent to the hospital in Columbus, Mississippi for gonorrhea. He was discharged from the hospital on February 1864, and he returned to his regiment. He saw his first combat experience on 1864. He remained in the regiment until the end of the war.

During the civil war, Dixon wore the Sigma Chi cross on his uniform, it was carved out of a silver dollar. He kept track of his Sigma Chi fraternity brothers throughout the war. In 1864, the Constantine Chapter was founded by Dixon, who served as president; Harry Yerger, as vice president; and Evan J. Shelby, and William H. Bolton, as members.

== Move to California ==
When the war ended Dixon moved to California. Starting in May 1870, his father Judge Richard Lawrence Dixon and his family lived at the Mordecai Ranch (formerly known as Refuge), a 2,200 acres (890 ha) ranch and farm in the Alabama Settlement (now Borden, California) in Madera County, California, which he farmed without irrigation.

On February 14, 1874, Dixon married Constance Maynard in San Francisco. At the time of their marriage, he was living in Millerton, in Madera County, California; and after marriage they moved to Fresno, California. Together they had 9 children, including Maynard and Harry. A few of their children did not make it into adulthood. The family house was built at 1605 K Street, in Fresno.

Dixon worked as a lawyer for many years in Fresno. He was joined by his father Richard in his legal practice. In the 1880s, Dixon was the first city attorney for Fresno. He was also the chair for the local vigilance committee, and a board member of the volunteer fire department in Fresno. In the 1880s, he continued to support Sigma Chi at local and national levels.

== Death and legacy ==
Around 1893, Dixon spent the rest of his life as an invalid. Dixon died at age 50 on August 27, 1898, in Fresno, of complications related to gonorrhea which he contracted in his youth. He is buried at Mountain View Cemetery in Fresno. His gravesite contains a large monument related to Sigma Chi.

Along U.S. Route 41 near Jonesboro, Georgia, is a 100 ton marble cross sculpture, dedicated by the Constantine Chapter and Dixon on May 6, 1939.

The University of North Carolina at Chapel Hill hold the Harry St. John Dixon Papers.
