= Mountain View Cemetery (Fresno) =

Cemetery in Fresno County, California

Coordinates: 36°44′59″N 119°49′36″W

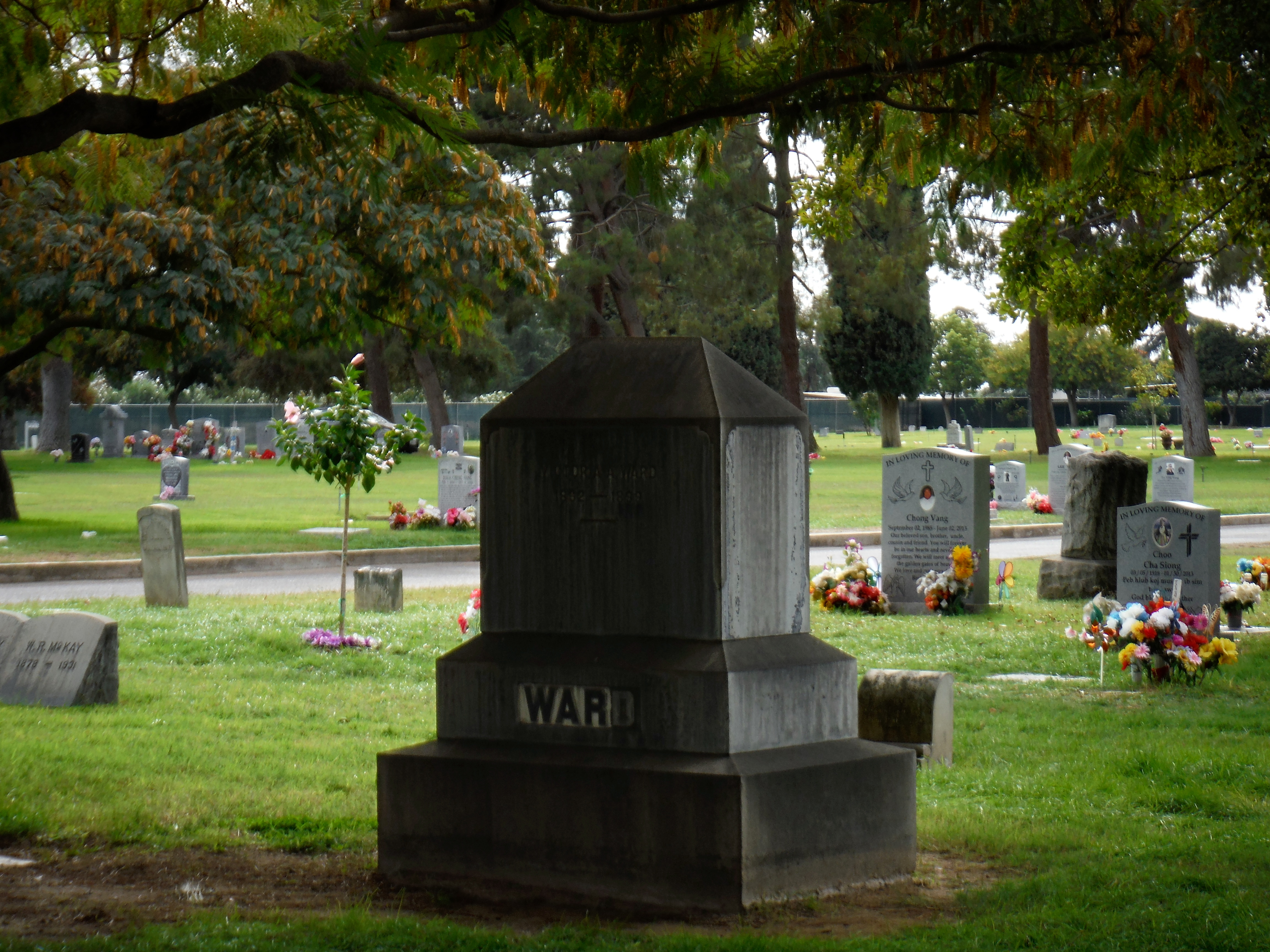
- Headstone at Mountain View Cemetery in 2014
- Interactive map of Mountain View Cemetery

Details
- Location: 1411 West Belmont Ave., Fresno, California
- Country: United States
- Find a Grave: Mountain View Cemetery

Mountain View Cemetery is a cemetery in Fresno, California, opened in the 1880s.

== History ==
In the early 1880s, Moses J. Church donated 80 acres of land along Belmont Avenue for the establishment of cemeteries. He named the combined plot Mountain View Cemetery but subdivided it and allocated it to a number of groups, such as Catholic, Seventh-Day Adventist, Episcopal, Christian, Masonic, Odd Fellows and many others. No fences were installed between the areas. John S. Eastwood performed the initial survey the property in 1888 as Fresno's City Engineer at the time. The 10-acres of donated land earmarked for the Armenian community became Ararat Cemetery.

Upkeep for the cemetery was assigned to the local Odd Fellows lodge. In 1910, citizens became concerned with plant overgrowth and lack of a map showing ownership of individual plots at the cemetery. They formed the "Mountain View Cemetery Improvement Association" and took over some management duties.

== Notable interments ==
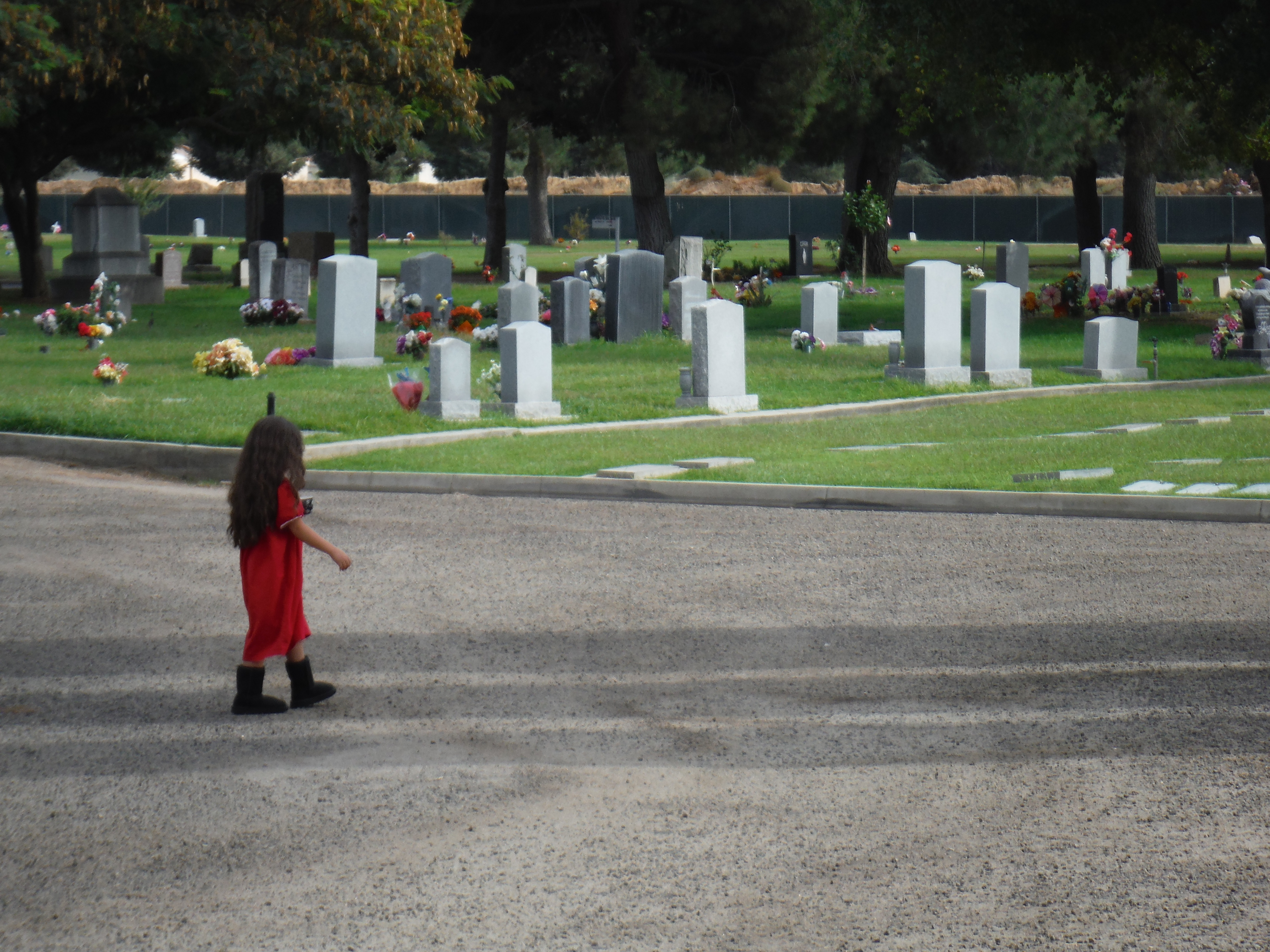
A young girl walking through Mountain View Cemetery

Notable interments listed in alphabetical order by surname.

- Harry St. John Dixon (1848–1898), Confederate officer, lawyer, rancher
- Frank Dusy, (1837–1898), early business leader of Selma, California, and a co-inventor of the Fresno Scraper
- John Samuel Eastwood (1857–1924), dam engineer and pioneer of hydroelectric power production
- Bertrand W. Gearhart (1890–1955), lawyer and politician who served in the United States House of Representatives for California's 9th congressional district
- Angelina J. Knox (1819–1896), inventor, abolitionist, philanthropist, missionary, and writer
- Dutch Leonard (1892–1952), pitcher in Major League Baseball who had an 11-year career playing for the Boston Red Sox and Detroit Tigers.
- Alma Rubens (1897–1931), film actress and stage performer.
- Frank Hamilton Short (1862–1920), lawyer and a states' rights advocate

== See also ==
- List of cemeteries in California
