= Jerry De La Cruz =

American fine artist (born 1948)

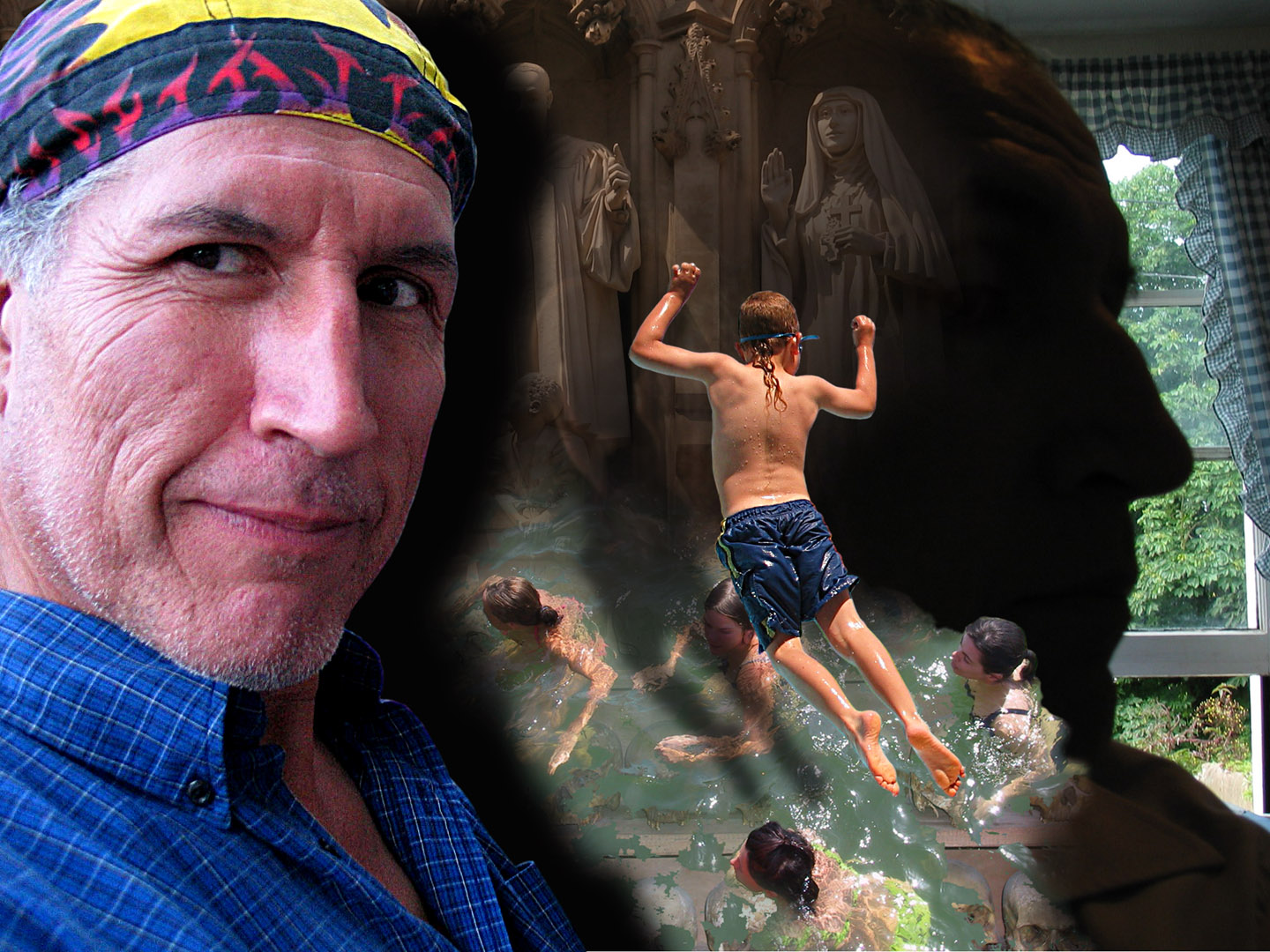
- De La Cruz in 2011
- Born: 1948 (age 76–77); Denver, Colorado
- Notable work: The Power (1994)

Jerry De La Cruz (born 1948) is an American fine artist born and raised in Denver, Colorado. He currently works out of his studio in the Santa Fe District in Denver, Colorado, and out of his studio in the Little River District in Miami, Florida.

== Work ==
“De La Cruz is a painter, a sculptor and a photographer. His work often combines mediums, but invariably is grounded in exquisite control and fine craftsmanship. He is among many well-known Denver artists, but is the only one whose work 'slaps you in the face and doesn't let you go.' It's definitely not safe. Realistically rendered human figures abound, as varied as reality, but rarely left in their realistic settings. They may be painted, drawn, photographed, sculpted, assembled or digitally manipulated, are most often juxtaposed against surreal settings, and always convey more than their physical characteristics. Each work is surprisingly different from the last and cannot, grouped together, be placed in any single category or style, beyond the fact that all are totally accessible, recognizable and without need for any knowledge for a meaningful interaction with the viewer.”

“De La Cruz's mastery of formal and experimental techniques reflects a career dedicated to creative probing and discipline. It is rare indeed to come into contact with an artist who so successfully ranges from abstraction to surrealism in single canvases. Themes of personal identity and interpersonal responsiveness are layered into his work, allowing the viewer to share in the artist's process of questioning the relationships of his subjects to the world. The insights that develop in his works are universal in their ability to connect the reflective with the informative.”

== Art ==
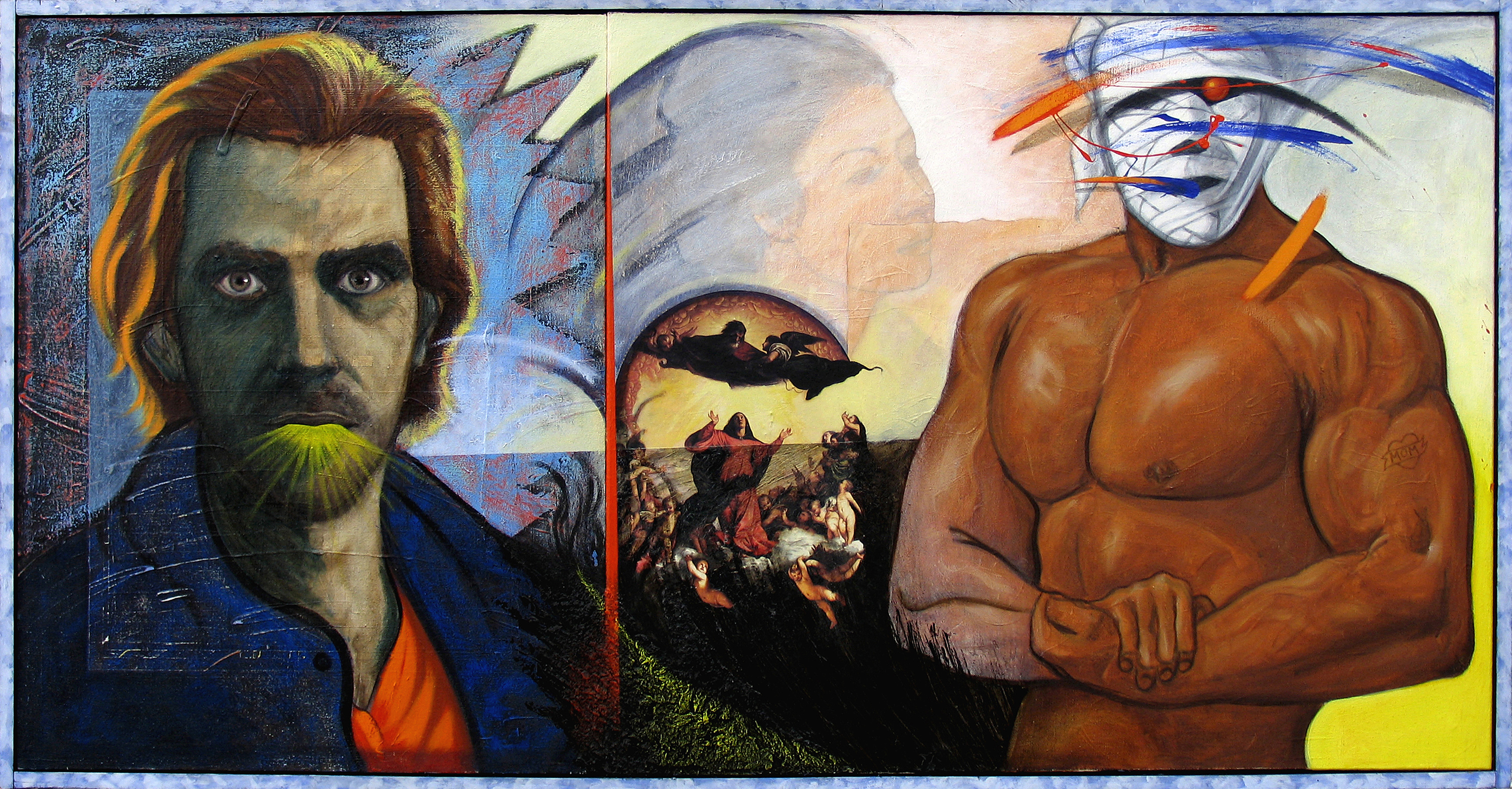
The Power, 1994

De La Cruz is listed among the three dozen most influential regional artists of the twentieth century (The Denver Post survey of regional curators). His is the only Spanish surname. At the first International Latino Art Auction held in Phoenix, AZ, in conjunction with Sotheby's (2003), De La Cruz proved to be the bestselling artist of the auction and drew the highest auction price for a single work. The Denver Art Museum's first purchase of a living Hispanic's work for its permanent collection was a De La Cruz. Years later, he was the only artist considered when that same museum wanted to commission a contemporary digital work commemorating the opening of its new Libeskind Building (2007). He was the recipient of back-to-back artist residency grants from Colorado in his early career and also received their very last painting fellowship in 2000. For a spell in 2006, works by De La Cruz were included in three unrelated art museum exhibits in Denver (the Denver Art Museum, El Museo, and the Mizel). Other honors include the award of Best Art Event of the Year by Westword Magazine and an appointment to Denver's Commission on Arts and Culture.

== Teaching/board participation ==
De La Cruz taught one class per week in drawing or painting at the Art Students League of Denver from 1987 through 2002. He also served on its board of directors from 1999-2002 as well as the board's faculty liaison during that time. In his earlier career, he also taught at his alma mater, Rocky Mountain College of Art and Design, as well as The Art Institute of Colorado. He was also appointed to serve as the (sole) fine artist on the Denver Commission on Cultural Affairs in 2005 and continues to serve on the Board of Directors of the Marble Institute of Colorado.

== Partial bibliography ==
- Rinaldi, Ray: "Sacred Fantasies," The Denver Post, Denver, CO, August 26, 2018; 1E.
- Paglia, Michael: "The Museo Showcases Jerry De La Cruz's Shape-Shifting Career." Westword Magazine, Denver, CO, January 13, 2016.
- Rinaldi, Ray: "Tripping with Jerry De La Cruz at Denver's Museo." The Denver Post, Denver, CO, December 17, 2015.
- Jones, Corey: "Denver's Jerry De La Cruz Finds the Archaeology in Art." Colorado Public Radio, Denver, CO, November 6, 2015.
- Museo de las Americas: Jerry De La Cruz: A Road Well Traveled (exhibit catalog). Denver, CO: Ventana Enterprises, 2015, 212 pgs.
- Mary Voelz Chandler: “Digital Brush Strokes”. Rocky Mountain News, Denver, CO, Aug. 31, 2007; 28.
- Kyle MacMillan: “Three Voices, One Worthwhile Exhibit”. The Denver Post, Denver, CO, April 20, 2007.
- Don Bain: “The Power and Glory of Tres Voces”, La Voz Colorado, Denver, CO, April 18, 2007; 9.
- Susan Froyd: “Culture Shock”, Westword Magazine, Denver, CO, April 12, 2007; 35.
- Paglia, Michael. “Turf Wars”. Westword Magazine, Denver, CO, March 2, 2006; 46.
- Chandler, Mary Voelz: “’Never Leaving’ Like Two Shows’. Rocky Mountain News, Denver, CO, February 17, 2006; 16D.
- De La Cruz, Jerry. “The Best Man and the Wedding Cake” (art image). Triumph of Our Communities: Four Decades of Mexican American Art. Tempe, AZ: Bilingual Press, 2005, 163.
- O’Donnell, Dana. “Dimensions in an Artful Life: The Extraordinary Journey of Jerry De La Cruz.” Colorado Modern Magazine, Denver, CO, Spring, 2005 (Vol. 2, #1): 6-9.
- Keller, Gary D., Erickson, Mary & Villeneuve, Pat. “Jerry De La Cruz.” Chicano Art for Our Millennium: Collected Works from the Arizona State University Community. Tempe, AZ: Bilingual Press, 2004, 145-146.
- Alvarado, Joaquín. “Jerry De La Cruz.” Contemporary Chicana & Chicano Art. Vole. I. Tempe, AZ: Bilingual Press, 2002, 150-151.
- De La Cruz, Jerry. “Fish Brides” (digital art). Digital Photography & Design, Sydney, Australia, Winter 2001: 41.
- Mallory, Elizabeth. “Jerry De La Cruz.” Interview. They Magazine, Denver, CO, November 2001 (Vol.4, #1): 1-11.
