= Arts Students League =

Art Students League may refer to:

- Art Students League of Denver (1987–present)
- Art Students League of Los Angeles (1906–1953)
- Art Students League of New York (1875–present) in Manhattan, New York
- Art Students' League of Philadelphia (1886–1893), started by Thomas Eakins
- Toronto Art Students' League (1886–1904)
- San Francisco Art Students League (1930s–1950s), started by Ray Strong in San Francisco, California
