= Sigma Chi =

North American collegiate fraternity

- ΣΧ
- Founded: June 28, 1855; 171 years ago Miami University
- Type: Social
- Affiliation: NIC
- Status: Active
- Scope: North America
- Motto: In Hoc Signo Vinces "In This Sign You Shall Conquer"
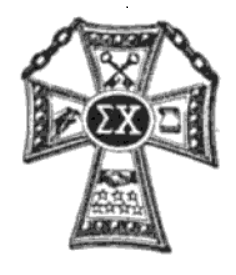
- Member badge
- Colors: Blue and Old gold
- Symbol: White cross
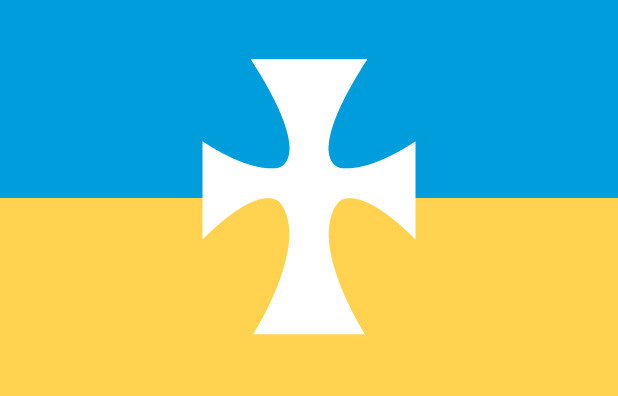
- Flag
- Flower: White rose
- Publication: The Magazine of Sigma Chi
- Philanthropy: Children's Miracle Network and Huntsman Cancer Institute
- Chapters: 242
- Colonies: 11
- Members: 15,600+ active 350,000+ lifetime
- Nicknames: Sig, Sigs'
- Headquarters: 1714 Hinman Avenue; Evanston, Illinois 60201; United States
- Website: Official website

Sigma Chi (ΣΧ) is one of the largest North American social fraternities. The fraternity has 244 active undergraduate chapters and 152 alumni chapters in the United States and Canada and has initiated over 350,000 members. It was founded on June 28, 1855, at Miami University in Oxford, Ohio, by members who split from the Delta Kappa Epsilon fraternity.

Sigma Chi is divided into seven operational entities: the Sigma Chi Fraternity, the Sigma Chi Foundation, the Sigma Chi Canadian Foundation, the Risk Management Foundation, Constantine Capital Inc., the Blue and Gold Travel Services, and the newly organized Sigma Chi Leadership Institute. According to the fraternity's constitution, "the purpose of this fraternity shall be to cultivate and maintain the high ideals of friendship, justice, and learning upon which Sigma Chi was founded."

== History ==
=== Founding ===
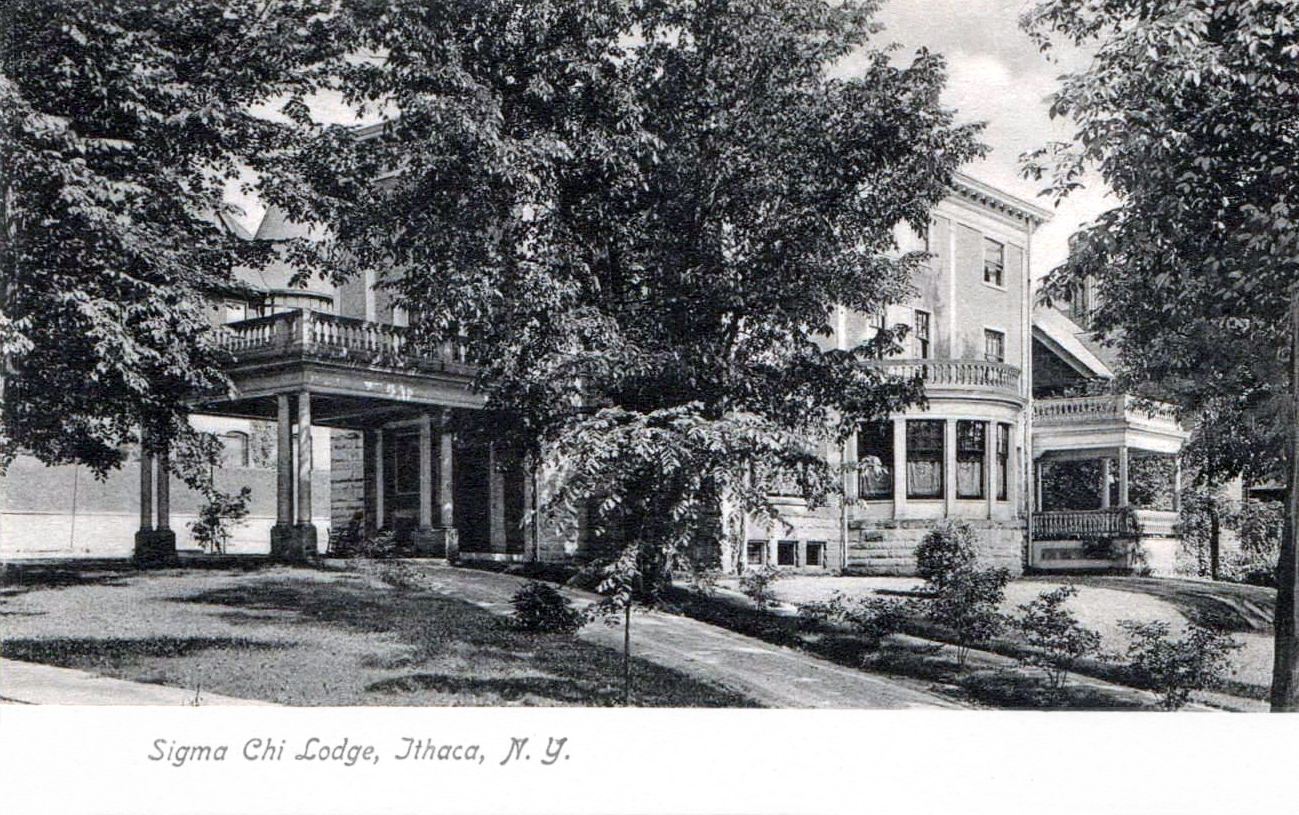
The Sigma Chi house at Cornell University in Ithaca, New York, c. 1905

Sigma Chi was founded in 1855 by Benjamin Piatt Runkle, Thomas Cowan Bell, William Lewis Lockwood, Isaac M. Jordan, Daniel William Cooper, Franklin Howard Scobey, and James Parks Caldwell as the result of a disagreement over who would be elected poet in the Erodelphian Literary Society of Miami University in Ohio.

Several members of Miami University's Delta Kappa Epsilon chapter (of which all but one of Sigma Chi's founders were members) were also members of Erodelphian. In the fall of 1854, the literary society was to elect its poet, and a member of Delta Kappa Epsilon was nominated for the position. He was supported by five of his brothers, but Caldwell, Jordan, Runkle, and Scobey supported another man who was not a member of the fraternity. Although Bell and Cooper were not members of Erodelphian, they had aligned themselves with the four dissenting members. The chapter had twelve members in total and was evenly divided on the issue. Both sides saw this as a matter of principle, and over the next few months, their friendships became distant.

In February 1855, Runkle and his companions planned a dinner for their brothers in an attempt to seal the rift. Whitelaw Reid, one of the other brothers who supported the Delta Kappa Epsilon member as poet, was the only one to arrive. Reid brought a Delta Kappa Epsilon alumnus named Minor Millikin from a nearby town. Reid had told Millikin his side of the dispute, and they had arrived to punish the group for not supporting their Delta Kappa Epsilon brother. The leaders of the rebellion, Runkle and Scobey, were to be expelled from the fraternity. The other four would be allowed to stay in the fraternity. Runkle resigned, and after the parent chapter at Yale University was contacted, all six men were formally expelled.

The six men decided to form their own fraternity along with Lockwood, a student from New York who had not joined a fraternity. On June 28, 1855, the organization was founded under the name Sigma Phi Fraternity. Lockwood used his business training to help organize the fraternity in its early years. The eventual theft of Sigma Phi's constitution, rituals, seals, and other records from Lockwood's room in Oxford in January 1856 prompted them to change the name of the fraternity to Sigma Chi. It is possible this action could have been forced upon the group, as there was already a Sigma Phi Society.

Much of Sigma Chi's heraldry was influenced by the legendary story of the Emperor Constantine from the Battle of Milvian Bridge against Maxentius. Runkle believed that Constantine should be an inspiration for members of the fraternity, and thus the vision of Constantine became the inspiration for the badge and the fraternity's public motto, In hoc signo vinces.

=== Founders ===
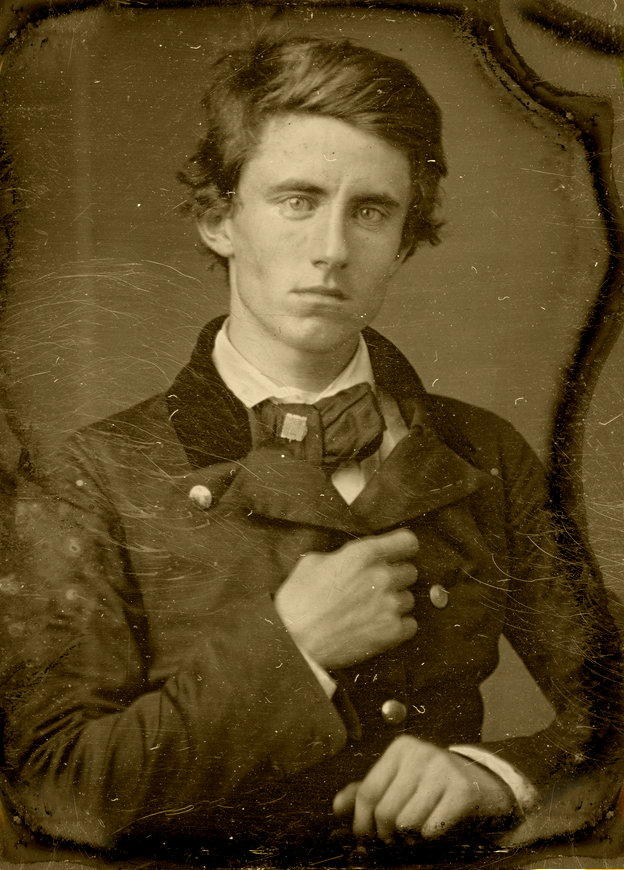
Benjamin Piatt Runkle, a Sigma Chi member and Union Army soldier who was badly wounded at the Battle of Shiloh during the American Civil War and later interred in Arlington National Cemetery

- Benjamin Piatt Runkle (September 3, 1836 – June 28, 1916) was born in West Liberty, Ohio. Runkle helped design the badge of Sigma Chi based on the story of Constantine and the vision of the Cross. Runkle was known for having a fierce pride and was suspended from Miami University when he fought a member of Beta Theta Pi for sneering at his badge. When the Civil War began, Runkle joined the Union Army. He was badly wounded at the Battle of Shiloh and left for dead on the battlefield. Runkle stayed in the army as a career and retired as a major general. After his service in the Union Army, he was ordained an Episcopal priest. He was the only founder to serve as Grand Consul. He died on Sigma Chi's 61st birthday in Ohio. He is buried in Arlington National Cemetery in Arlington County, Virginia.
- Thomas Cowan Bell (May 14, 1832 – February 3, 1919) was born near Dayton, Ohio. He was twenty-three years old when Sigma Chi was founded, the second oldest of the founders. He graduated from Miami University in 1857 and began teaching. In 1861, he enlisted in the Union Army and rose to the rank of lieutenant. After the war, he returned to his career in education, serving as the superintendent of schools in Nobles County, Minnesota, as well as the principal and president of several preparatory and collegiate institutions in the Western United States. Bell died the day after attending the initiation of the Alpha Beta chapter at University of California Berkeley on February 3, 1919. He is buried at the Presidio of San Francisco in San Francisco National Cemetery in California. Section OS, Row 43A, Grave 3.
- William Lewis Lockwood (October 31, 1836 – August 17, 1867) was born in New York City. He was the only founder who had not been a member of Delta Kappa Epsilon. He was considered the "businessman" of the founders and managed the first chapter's funds and general operations, becoming the first treasurer of Sigma Chi. After graduating from Miami University in 1858, he moved back to New York and began work as a lawyer. He received serious wounds serving in the Union Army during the Civil War, from which he never fully recovered. He named his son after Franklin Howard Scobey.
- Isaac M. Jordan (May 5, 1835 – December 3, 1890) was born in Mifflinburg, Pennsylvania as Isaac Alfred Jordan. His family later moved to Ohio, where Jordan met Benjamin Piatt Runkle and became close friends. After graduating from Miami University in 1857, he went on to graduate school, where he graduated in 1862. He then began work as an attorney and was elected to the United States Congress in 1882. He proceeded to change his middle name, Alfred, to just the letter "M" to help distinguish himself from his brother and law partner, Jackson A. Jordan. He died in 1890 after accidentally falling down an elevator shaft while greeting a friend. He is buried in Spring Grove Cemetery in Cincinnati, Ohio.
- Daniel William Cooper (September 2, 1830 – December 11, 1920) was born near Fredericktown, Ohio. Cooper was the oldest founder and was elected the first consul of Sigma Chi. After graduating from Miami University in 1857, he became a Presbyterian minister. Cooper's original Sigma Chi badge came into the possession of the Fraternity at the time of his death. It is pinned on every new Grand Consul at their installation. Cooper is buried at the Allegheny Cemetery in Pittsburgh, Pa.
- Franklin Howard Scobey (May 27, 1837 – July 22, 1888) was born in Hamilton, Ohio. Scobey was considered the Spirit of Sigma Chi for being friendly with everybody and not just a select group of people. After graduating from Miami University in 1858, he went on to graduate again in 1861 with a law degree. He worked as a journalist in his hometown until 1879, but went on to become a cattleman in Kansas until 1882. Scobey then moved back to Ohio, where he took up farming until his death. Never physically robust, Scobey was afflicted with hearing loss in his final years.
- James Parks Caldwell (March 27, 1841 – April 5, 1912) was born in Monroe, Ohio. By the age of thirteen, Caldwell had completed all the academics that could be offered at his local academy. He was then sent to Miami University with advanced credits. Caldwell was just fourteen at the time of the founding, making him the youngest of the founders. After Caldwell graduated from Miami University in 1857, he practiced law in Ohio but moved to Mississippi to begin a career as an educator. When the Civil War broke out, he joined the Confederate Army. During the war, he was taken prisoner but, later, due to the influence of General Benjamin Piatt Runkle, was offered freedom on the condition that he renounce his allegiance to the Confederacy. He rejected this offer and remained loyal to the South. He was later released, again due to the influence of General Runkle. After the war, he moved back to Mississippi and was admitted to the bar. He moved to California in 1867 and practiced law. In 1875, he began to travel frequently, practicing law and editing newspapers. He died in Biloxi, Mississippi, where the latest issues of The Sigma Chi Quarterly were found in his room.

=== Early years ===
==== Constantine chapter ====
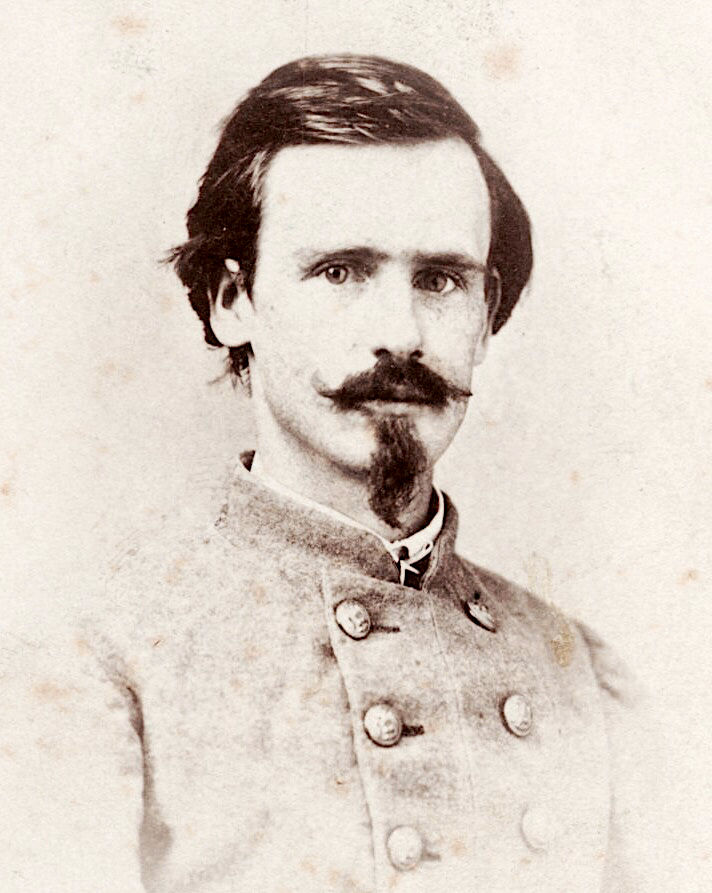
Harry St. John Dixon, a Sigma Chi member and Confederate States Army soldier in the Civil War, c. 1865

Harry St. John Dixon, a brother from the Psi chapter at the University of Virginia in Charlottesville, Virginia, who fought for the Confederacy, kept a record of all Sigma Chis within his vicinity on the flyleaf of his diary during the Civil War. He began planning a Confederate Army chapter of Sigma Chi with this information. On September 17, 1864, Dixon founded the Constantine chapter of Sigma Chi during the Atlanta campaign with Harry Yerger, a brother from Mississippi who was in Dixon's division. Dixon stated the reasons for which the wartime chapter was created, saying,

It was ascertained that a number of the fraternity were in the army of Tennessee under General Joseph E. Johnston during the Atlanta campaign in 1864. It was conceded that the South was forever disunited from the general government, and it was assumed that all chapters throughout the South would cease to exist. Furthermore, it was deemed expedient that we brothers should know each other and our several commands for relief in distress, and communication in a case of need, with our Northern brethren. In the ruin at hand, my sentiment was to preserve the lofty principles typified by the White Cross. I know that I had no authority to establish a chapter of Sigma Chi outside a college, or at all; but, isolated as we were, I thought I should raise the standard and fix a rallying point. By doing so, we should preserve the Order, whether we failed or not in our struggle for independence.

Dixon and Yerger contacted all brothers listed in the diary who could come to the meeting. They met at night in a deserted log cabin a few miles southwest of Atlanta. Dixon later wrote,

The cabin was in a state of frightful dilapidation. Its rude walls and rafters were covered with soot and cobwebs, and the floor showed evidence of having been the resting place of sundry heaps of sheep.

Dixon was elected "Sigma" (president), and Yerger was elected "Chi" (vice president); the chapter also initiated two men. The only badge in the chapter was one Dixon had made from a silver half-dollar.

The last meeting was held on New Year's Day 1865. The men at that meeting passed a resolution to pay a "tribute of respect" to the four brothers from the chapter who had died during the war. In May 1939, the Constantine chapter memorial was erected by Sigma Chi in memory of the Constantine chapter and its members. The memorial is located on U.S. 41 in Clayton County, Georgia.

==== Purdue case ====
In 1876, Emerson E. White became president of Purdue University. He required each applicant for admission to sign a pledge "not to join or belong to any so-called Greek society or other college secret society" while attending the school. The Sigma Chi chapter at Purdue, which was already established at the university, sent petitions to the faculty and pleaded their case to the board of trustees, but was unsuccessful in changing the rule.

In the fall of 1881, Thomas P. Hawley applied for admission to the university. Having already been initiated into Sigma Chi, Hawley refused to sign the pledge and was denied admission. Hawley took Purdue to court, but the judge ruled in favor of the faculty's decision. He also ruled, however, that the faculty had no right to deny Hawley from his classes based on the fraternity issue. The case was brought to the Indiana Supreme Court, which reversed the decision on June 21, 1882. This victory for Sigma Chi also allowed other fraternities at Purdue and led to the Purdue president's resignation in 1883.

=== 20th century ===
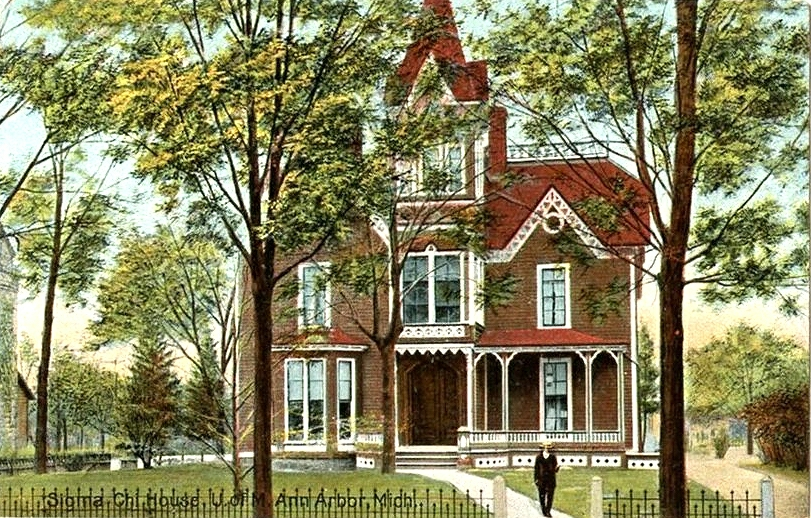
Sigma Chi house at the University of Michigan in Ann Arbor, Michigan, c. 1906–1909

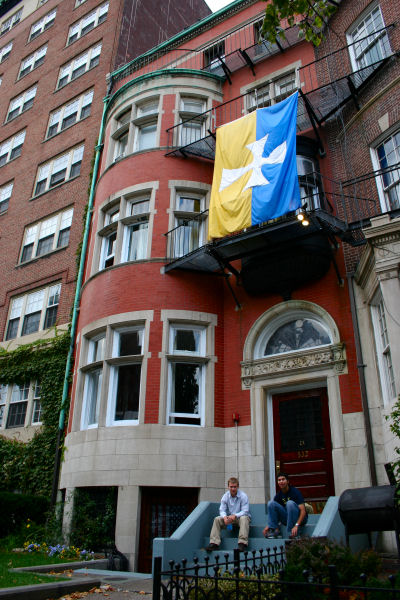
Sigma Chi house at MIT in Cambridge, Massachusetts

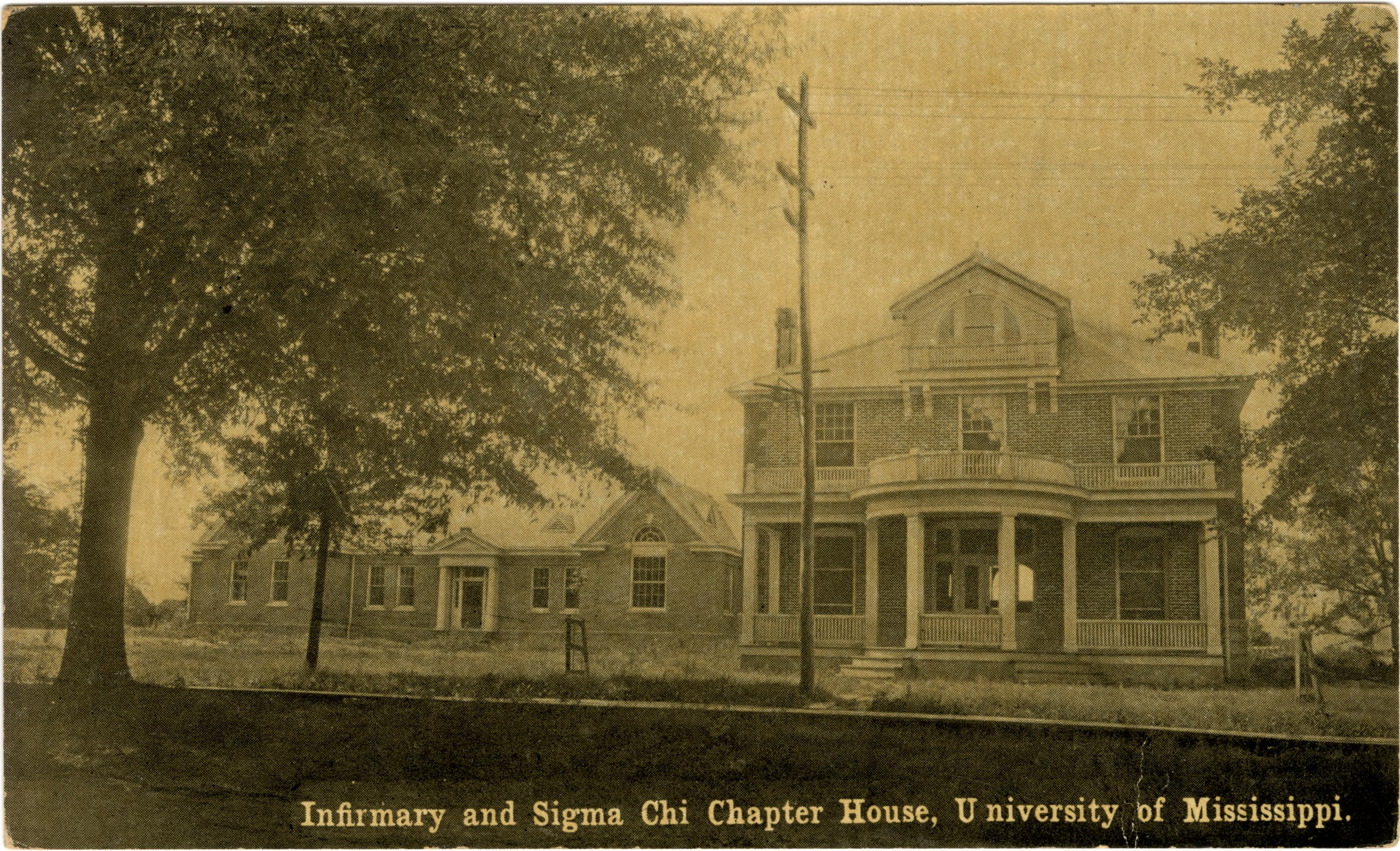
The Infirmary and Sigma Chi chapter house at the University of Mississippi in Oxford, Mississippi

During the first half of the 20th century, the general fraternity expanded in many places. In 1899, the fraternity adopted the flag design created by Henry V. Vinton. In 1901, the grand chapter approved the fraternity's pledge pin. In 1903, at the grand chapter in Detroit, the board of grand trustees was established. In 1922, the Alpha Beta chapter at University of California, Berkeley held the Channingway Derby, which led to the creation of the Sigma Chi Derby Days. Some of the awards created during this time include the Significant Sig Award in 1935 and the Order of Constantine in 1948.

As of the beginning of the 20th century, Sigma Chi had installed a total of 74 chapters, with 58 still active. Having only established a centralized form of government in 1922, Sigma Chi was installing new chapters at a rate of about one chapter per year. On April 22, 1922, the Beta Omega chapter was installed at the University of Toronto in Toronto, Ontario, thus making Sigma Chi an international fraternity.

The Sigma Chi Foundation was created on November 9, 1939, when the Sigma Chi Endowment Foundation was incorporated in Colorado. This educational endowment was first discussed in 1898 by alumni who wanted to assist undergraduates financially so they could finish their undergraduate studies.

The world wars of the 20th century took the lives of 103 Sigs in World War I and 738 in World War II. A great resurgence in undergraduate activity followed World War II due to an increase in chapter memberships. This increase was caused by the men returning from military service who went back to school, and the usual addition of new brothers. During World War II, it became apparent to the general fraternity officers that a few alumni, as well as a few undergraduate chapters, believed some of the prerequisites for membership in Sigma Chi were outdated and should be changed or eliminated.

This led to the first discussions about membership within the fraternity that continued until early 1970. Until this time, membership requirements had specified that a potential member must be a "bona fide white male student". After the first discussion in 1948 at the grand chapter in Seattle, the committee on Constitutional Amendments tabled the issue pending a further study of the problem to be reported to the 1950 grand chapter. The study showed that the issue was "very hot" on thirteen campuses with Sigma Chi chapters and only "lukewarm" on a dozen other campuses.

During this time period, the remaining four founders of Sigma Chi all died; Daniel William Cooper was the last founder to die. Cooper's death led to the fraternity gaining one of its most priceless objects, Cooper's Sigma Phi badge. Cooper's body was sent by train to his final resting place in Pittsburgh, and the Beta Theta chapter at the University of Pittsburgh was given the privilege to administer his memorial service.

On December 13, 1920, Cooper's body was conveyed to the Beta Theta chapter house, where Beta Theta Consul Donald E. Walker removed Cooper's Sigma Phi Badge and replaced it with his own. Beta Theta pro-consul, Regis Toomey, sang the hymn "With Sacred Circle Broken" before Cooper was taken to his final resting place.

== Nomenclature and insignia ==
=== Badge ===
The badge of Sigma Chi is a white cross with white and black enamel. Two gold chains connect the two upper arms. Crossed keys are in the upper arm, an eagle's head lies in the left arm, and a scroll lies in its right arm. In the bottom arm lie two clasped hands and seven stars. If worn, the badge is to be slanted over the left shoulder, akin to how soldiers of Emperor Constantine pointed their blades.

=== Seal ===
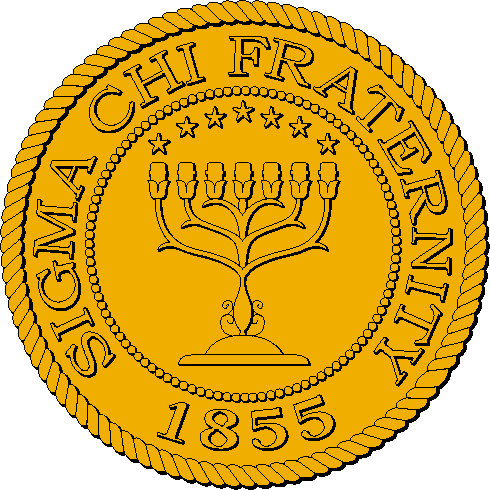
Sigma Chi's seal

The seal of Sigma Chi is circular. On the outer edge is the name "Sigma Chi Fraternity", and at the bottom are the numbers "1855". In the middle lie seven stars and a seven-branched candlestick.

=== Coat of Arms ===
The crest of Sigma Chi is a blue Norman Shield with a white cross in its center. On top of the Norman Shield is a scroll and a crest of an eagle's head holding a key. Below it, the fraternity's public motto, In hoc signo vinces, is placed on a scroll.

== Governance ==
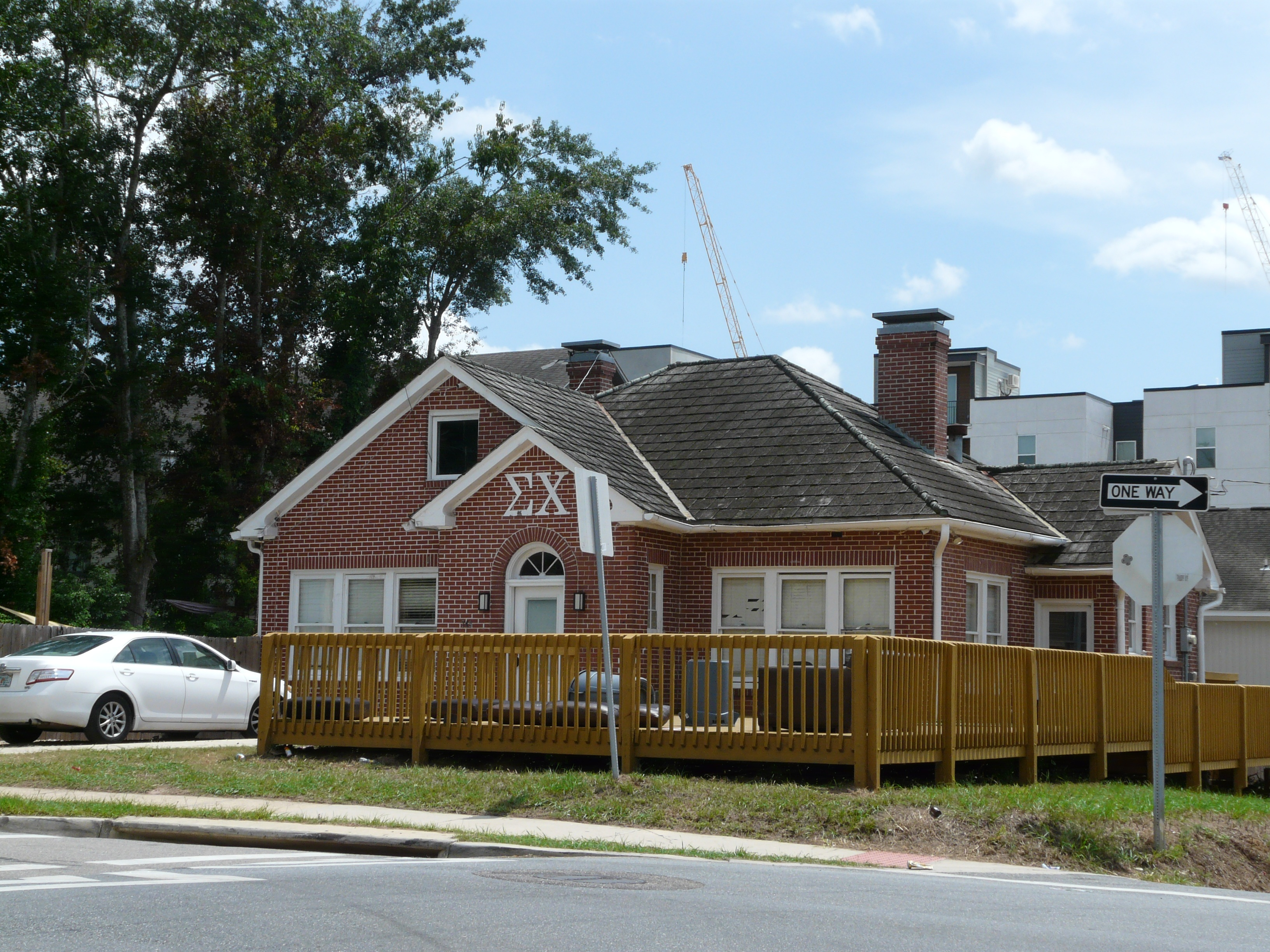
Epsilon Zeta Chapter at Florida State University

=== Chapter officers ===
Officers in undergraduate chapters mostly have titles derived from Imperial Rome. The top officers of each chapter are known as the consul (president), pro consul (vice-president), annotator (secretary), quaestor (treasurer), magister (pledge trainer), kustos (sergeant-at-arms), and tribune (communications). Chapters also have other positions, such as risk manager, historian scholarship chairman, house manager, recruitment chairman.

Alumni chapter positions and duties may also vary from chapter to chapter. Alumni chapters use the more common office titles such as president, vice-president, secretary, and treasurer.

=== Grand officers ===
The international organization uses similar Roman titles, typically with the prefix of "grand". The grand consul is the international president of Sigma Chi. He presides over the executive committee and the grand chapter.

=== Grand chapter ===
The grand chapter is the supreme legislative body of Sigma Chi and convenes in odd-numbered years. It is composed of one delegate from each active undergraduate chapter and alumni chapter, the grand consul and past grand consuls, each being entitled to one vote. The grand chapter elects the officers of the Fraternity as well as alter or amend the constitution, statutes, and executive committee regulations. It may grant or revoke charters as well as discipline any chapter, officer, or member.

=== Grand council ===
The grand council meets every year when no grand chapter is held. The grand council consists of the grand officers, past grand consuls, members of the executive committee, grand trustees, grand praetors, members of the leadership training board, and one undergraduate from each province. It may amend the statutes or executive committee regulations.

=== Executive Committee ===
The executive committee meets at least four times a year. The executive committee consists of twelve members; grand consul, grand pro consul, grand quaestor, the immediate past grand consul, a grand trustee elected by the board of grand trustees, two grand praetors elected by the praetorial college, one alumnus member-at-large, two undergraduate representatives elected by the undergraduate delegates from each chapter, and the two most recent International Balfour Award winners. The committee regulates the budget and expenditures as well as assigns duties to the international headquarters staff.

=== Charitable foundations ===
The Sigma Chi Foundation is a charitable and educational tax-exempt organization, separate and independent from the fraternity, whose express purpose is to serve as an educational funding resource for the undergraduate and graduate student members of the Sigma Chi Fraternity. A board of governors governs the foundation. The foundation's offices are based in Evanston, Illinois.

The Sigma Chi Canadian Foundation is the Canadian counterpart of The Sigma Chi Foundation. It serves independently of both the fraternity and the American foundation. It was formed by Canadian Sigma Chi Alumni as a registered charitable foundation to provide a tax-effective way for Canadian Sigma Chi to support the educational pursuits of Canadian undergraduate chapters. The foundation is guided by a chair and a board of directors of alumni members.

== Leadership programs ==
- The Krach Transformational Leaders Workshop (KTLW) is a three-day retreat held annually since 1947. Undergraduate members receive training for specific roles within their chapter. Alumni volunteers are also given mentorship training. The KTLW is named after the 64th Grand Consul of the Fraternity, Keith Krach.
- Horizons is a six-day workshop for undergraduate brothers. The program aims to create lifelong values-based leaders.
- Mission 365 is a recruitment workshop. Participants are taught how to "increase both the quality and quantity" of potential new members.
- The Journey Program is self-improvement training for undergraduate chapters. There are six Journey workshops, each with a specific aim to better one aspect of the chapter.
- The Sigma Chi Choices program and Sigma Chi Crossroads Workshop both aim to combat drug and alcohol abuse and address mental health among members.
- Sigma Chi Lifeline is an online resource for those suffering from mental illness. The program aims to prevent suicide among college students by providing information and support for those affected by emotional and mental health issues.

== Philanthropy ==
=== Derby Days ===
Derby Days is a series of charity events held by all Sigma Chi chapters. Throughout the course of a week, a participating chapter organizes and hosts a series of events and competitions among its campus's sororities. Money is raised through either donations or fundraising-type events. Hosting a Derby Days event is not mandatory for any chapter. A common event held across many campuses is the Derby Run, where brothers must wear derbies throughout the day, while sisters in participating sororities attempt to steal them. According to the international fraternity's official website, the basic mission of Derby Days is to serve the community. According to archival information at Sigma Chi international headquarters, the first Derby Day event was held in 1916 at the University of California-Berkeley. Then known as the "Channing Way Derby" because of the California-Berkeley chapter's location on Channing Way and College Avenue, the event spread to other chapters, which created their own Derby Day. This money is all donated to the Huntsman Cancer Foundation.

=== Merlin Olsen Day of Service ===
In honor of notable Sigma Chi alumni and NFL Hall of Fame inductee Merlin Olsen, September 15 is recognized by the fraternity as the Merlin Olsen Day of Service. On this day, members of the fraternity are encouraged to volunteer to improve their communities. Children's Miracle Network Hospitals (CMNH) is Sigma Chi's suggested beneficiary. The organization was introduced to the fraternity by Olsen in 1992. Since then, Sigma Chi alumni and undergraduate chapters have raised more than 6.9 million for CMNH. Every chapter has a CMNH affiliate within less than 200 miles, with each chapter donating to the nearest affiliated hospital.

=== Huntsman Cancer Foundation/Huntsman Cancer Institute ===
The Huntsman Cancer Institute (HCF/HCI) is Sigma Chi's preferred charitable partner. It was chosen at Sigma Chi's 150th anniversary celebration in 2005. The Huntsman Cancer Institute today is dedicated to researching the causes, treatments, and preventative methods of cancer. The institute was founded in 1995 by Sigma Chi alumnus, and founder of the Huntsman Corporation, Jon M. Huntsman Sr. Huntsman has donated more than 350 million dollars to the institute, and has encouraged his fellow brothers to contribute as well.

== Awards ==
=== Undergraduate awards ===
Sigma Chi gives out two undergraduate awards, The Peterson Significant Chapter Award, which is given to chapters who show a strong performance in all areas of chapter operations, and The International Balfour Award, which is given each year to one graduating senior who excels in four criteria: scholarship, character, fraternity service, and campus leadership.

=== Alumni awards ===
The fraternity also gives out three alumni awards: The Significant Sig Award is given to a member who has excelled greatly in his field of study or occupation. The first seven Significant Sig awards were given to George Ade, Roy Chapman Andrews, John T. McCutcheon, Chase S. Osborn, James Wallington, F. Dudleigh Vernor, and Samuel P. Cowley. The Order of Constantine is awarded to alumni members who have devoted long and distinguished service to the Fraternity. The Semi-Century Sig Award is given to brothers who have been active in the fraternity for 50 years or more.

=== International Sweetheart ===
Most undergraduate chapters elect a female associated with the chapter as the chapter sweetheart. At each grand chapter, the fraternity chooses a Sweetheart from one chapter to be the International Sweetheart of Sigma Chi for two years. The International Sweetheart Award is presented based on personality, character, campus involvement, Sigma Chi activities, general accomplishments, poise, and grace. Each nominee must be the sweetheart of an undergraduate chapter for the year nominated and a student at the nominating chapter's university. Judy Garland was a Sigma Chi Sweetheart from the Ohio State University chapter and Faye Dunaway was a Sigma Chi Sweetheart from The University of Florida chapter.

=== Military Service Recognition Pin ===
The Military Service Recognition Pin recognizes honorably discharged veterans or currently serving members of the armed forces who are in good standing with the Sigma Chi Fraternity. The pin consists of a single Norman-style sword thrust upward with a small Sigma Chi Norman Shield with a cross embossed upon it placed upon the lower end of the blade just above the hilt and is to be worn on the brother's lapel. The military service pin concept and design was created by Life Loyal Sig Anthony Dauer Theta Beta 1993 and was first presented at the 2007 grand chapter.

== Publications ==
The Magazine of Sigma Chi is the fraternity's official quarterly publication for undergraduate and alumni. First published in 1881 at Gettysburg College, Theta chapter, as The Sigma Chi, publication eventually moved to Chicago, and the name was changed to The Sigma Chi Quarterly. The name was later changed to The Magazine of Sigma Chi

The Norman Shield is the reference manual of the fraternity. It was authorized by the 24th grand consul Herbert C. Arms at the 1924 grand chapter. It was first compiled in 1929 by Arthur Vos, Jr. and based on the booklet he prepared for the Beta Mu chapter at the University of Colorado at Boulder which Vos indicated was based on the material contained in the 1922 Manual and Directory. It contained biographies of the founders, significant alumni, a history of the fraternity, the constitution and statutes, and other writings relevant to the fraternity.

== Chapters ==
As of 2023, the fraternity has sixteen associate chapters or colonies.

== Notable members ==
Sigma Chi has initiated more than 350,000 members. Sigma Chi has alumni who are notable in many different industries and fields. In athletics Sigma Chi has five MLB all-stars, six World Series champions, seven NFL All-Pro players, six Super Bowl champions, two NCAA Basketball champions, and three Olympic medal holders. Some of these notable Sigs include Mike Holmgren, Mike Ditka, Bob Griese, Drew Brees, Sean Payton, Joe Gordon, Jay Wright, and Eric Fonoimoana. In politics Sigma Chi has had 24 U.S. Representatives, eleven U.S. Senators, eight United States Governors, five Lieutenant governors, and one United States President, through the honorary membership of Grover Cleveland to the University of Michigan chapter. Among Sigma Chi's notable actors include nine Emmy Award winners, five Screen Actors Guild Award winners, four Golden Globe Award winners, and three Academy Award winners. These notable alumni include Brad Pitt, John Wayne, Tom Selleck, Brian Dennehy, Woody Harrelson, David Letterman, and Ty Burrell.

== Controversies and member misconduct ==
=== 20th century ===
- In 1965 and 1967, respectively, the Sigma Chi chapters at Stanford University in Stanford, California and Whitman College in Walla Walla, Washington disaffiliated from the national fraternity organization when they refused to abide by the whites-only membership policy of the national organization. The policy of the national organization was changed in 1971 to eliminate racial discrimination.

=== 2000s ===
- In 2004, a nineteen-year-old University of Oklahoma freshman was found dead in the Sigma Chi fraternity house. The university suspended its recognition of the Beta Kappa chapter. In 2006, the Beta Kappa chapter of Sigma Chi was reinstated at the University of Oklahoma.
- The chapter at San Jose State University in San Jose, California found a member, Gregory Johnson Jr., hanged in its basement on November 22, 2008. Ruled a suicide at the time, a group of activists in 2020 later publicized their concerns over what they believe to be an incomplete investigation of Johnson's death, citing the possibility of racist motivations.
- The chapter at the University of Nebraska–Lincoln was suspended for hazing and alcohol consumption violations in 2009. The hazing pledges endured included taking shots of Tabasco hot sauce and vodka until they vomited, they were ordered to do strenuous exercises while their "big brothers" threw objects at them, and one pledge was randomly chosen and was anally penetrated with a vibrating dildo by a hired female stripper during an initiation party. Eight members were arrested and charged with hazing and providing alcohol to minors.

=== 2010s ===
- In September 2012, University of Tennessee at Chattanooga campus police fielded a report of a rape at the Sigma Chi fraternity house.
- In 2012, the chapter at the University of Alabama in Tuscaloosa, Alabama was sued by a former pledge who claimed he was severely beaten by fraternity members at a party that resulted in serious injuries, depression, and severe anxiety. The chapter was also cited for providing alcohol to underage people.
- The chapter at the University of Dayton in Dayton was suspended for three years in 2013 for damaging a store's property, urinating inside the store, and exposing themselves to passersby. The University of Dayton permanently banned the fraternity in 2014 after a member’s death revealed the chapter had not been abiding by the parameters of an earlier suspension.
- A fraternity member at Westminster College in Fulton, Missouri served 120 days in jail for physically assaulting one of his fraternity brothers in 2013.
- The chapter at the University of Central Florida in Orlando was placed on suspension in 2013 after photos surfaced on social media of pledges being forced to consume alcohol and getting sick from over-consumption. Several other fraternities on campus were also accused of hazing and alcohol abuse with their pledges that same semester, which led to the president of the university temporarily banning all Greek Life activities on campus.
- Three Sigma Chi members at James Madison University in Harrisonburg, Virginia were expelled from the fraternity due to allegations of sexually assaulting a female student and distributing a recording of the incident. The members were banned from the campus after their graduation in 2014 and expelled from the fraternity immediately.
- The chapter at the West Virginia University in Morgantown had six members arrested in 2014 and cited by the Morgantown police department for hazing pledges and facilitating underage drinking. After a party hosted by the fraternity, several members dropped off nineteen pledges, most of whom were intoxicated, at a random location far away from campus without their cellphones and wallets, and told them to find their way back to their fraternity house on campus as part of a "team building" exercise.
- A Sigma Chi member at Utah State University in Logan was kicked out of the fraternity in 2015 after being charged with two counts of rape and aggravated sexual assault. The attacks are believed to have taken place at the fraternity house.
- The chapter at Brown University in Providence, Rhode Island was suspended in 2015 for facilitating sexual misconduct and hosting an unauthorized party with alcohol.
- The chapter at Louisiana State University in Baton Rouge was shut down in 2015 for repeatedly hazing pledges and illegal drug use in the fraternity house. Two months before the chapter closure, a 21-year-old fraternity member died of a heroin overdose.
- The chapter at the University of Tennessee at Chattanooga was suspended after the rape of a minor in 2016. The investigation uncovered 148 reports of sexual offenses over 7 years.
- A former pledge at the University of Arizona in Tucson sued his chapter in 2016 after his fraternity brothers blamed him for the nonfatal overdose of a female party attendee.
- The chapter at Florida Atlantic University in Boca Raton expelled a member in 2017 after he was found to have embezzled over $18,000 from the chapter's funds. The reason the former brother embezzled the funds was to fund his heroin addiction.
- The chapter at Fresno State University was suspended in 2019 due to underage drinking, property damage, noise complaints, and multiple physical assaults that resulted in serious injuries at their fraternity-sponsored party, which they promoted as "Cinco de Drinko", May 5. After learning of the incident, the university and Sigma Chi international headquarters placed the chapter on interim suspension. The suspension was lifted by Fresno State on February 3, 2020.

=== 2020s ===
- A former pledge at the University of Texas at Arlington (UT Arlington) sued the fraternity for $1 million in 2020. While pledging the fraternity, he was ordered by fraternity members to excessively consume alcohol, which led to alcohol poisoning. Also, he was subject to other hazing activities that often led to humiliation and blackouts. National leadership of the fraternity decided to suspend the UT Arlington chapter indefinitely. In 2024, Sigma Chi returned to UT Arlington.
- In 2021, as part of an allegedly mandatory hazing event at the University of Tennessee at Chattanooga chapter, 18-year-old freshman Dylan Johnson died as a result of excessive alcohol consumption. Manslaughter charges were brought against the Sigma Chi organization itself, rather than any individuals. In response, the chapter dissolved, and the case was suspended. UTC later settled with Johnson's family for 3.46 million dollars.
- A sexual assault was reported to University of Nebraska–Lincoln campus police and on social media in August 2021 as having taken place at Sigma Chi in Lincoln. Sigma Chi announced the chapter was being placed on "self-suspension", and the accused fraternity member was ejected. The report came in during ongoing street protests against nearby Phi Gamma Delta, where a sexual assault was reported a week prior.
- In January 2022, National Public Radio obtained a partial copy of a police report of a call by then-student Elizabeth Holmes on October 5, 2003, in which she said she had been sexually assaulted in the early hours of that morning at the Sigma Chi fraternity house at Stanford University. Holmes would found the biotechnology start-up company Theranos later that same year, and the alleged sexual assault came to light when she was on trial for fraud in her work at the company in 2021.
- In November 2024, the fraternity at Indiana University was issued a cease and desist order for hazing violations.
- In March 2025, the fraternity at the University of Central Florida was suspended and placed under investigation after an alleged hazing incident. An eyewitness reported to authorities that pledges were told to stand in front of cars while fraternity members intentionally drove into and hit them. According to the report, fraternity members were driving between 10 and 15 miles per hour before hitting pledges. The fraternity has a long history of disciplinary actions given by the university, including eight just between 2015 and 2020.
- In August 2026, members of the chapter at the Pennsylvania State University were charged by Pennsylvania Attorney General Dave Sunday with felony corrupt organizations, conspiracy, dealing in proceeds of unlawful activity, and related offenses in connection to a cocaine-trafficking operation.

== See also ==
- List of social fraternities and sororities
