= Art Students League of Denver =

American nonprofit art center in Denver, Colorado

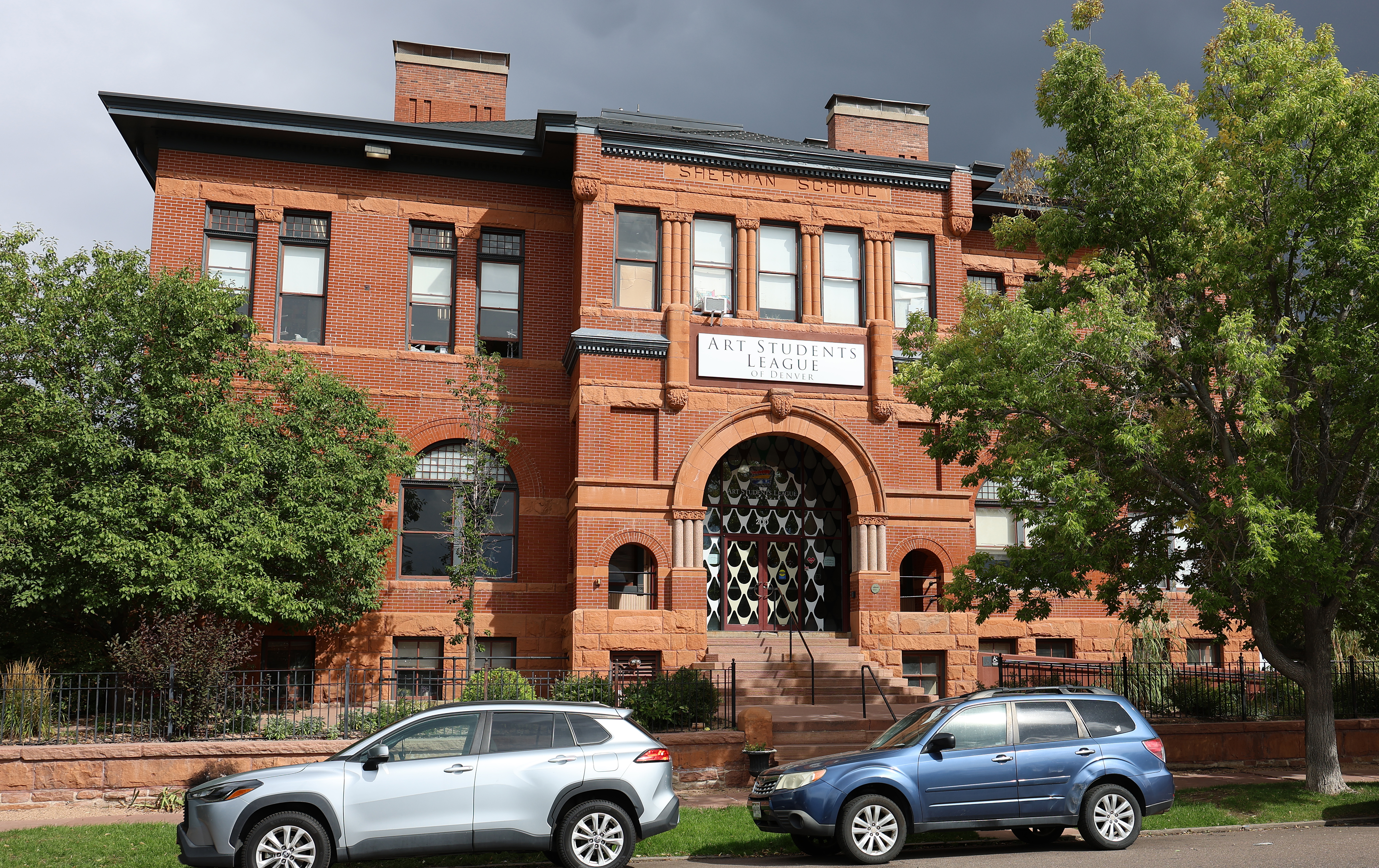
ASLD's building in Denver, a former elementary school

The Art Students League of Denver (ASLD) is a 501(c)(3) art nonprofit community center based in the Speer neighborhood of Denver, Colorado, USA. Modeled after the Art Students League of New York, it is located in the historic Sherman School at 200 Grant Street, Denver. ASLD offers art classes to youth and adults at the Sherman School location and in community engagement programs throughout the Denver metro area. ASLD offers annual membership and exhibition opportunities.

== History ==
The Art Students League of Denver was founded in 1987 by seven art enthusiasts in the Denver art community. At the time of founding, classes took place in two artist studios in Lower Downtown Denver on Market Street. In the early 90s, ASLD later moved to the Sherman School on Grant Street.

The Sherman School was built in 1897 by architect Henry Dozier under Mayor Robert Speer's City Beautiful Movement in a Romanesque style. The building originally served as an elementary school. An annex was built in 1920 with a garden on the north side of the main building. Dozier was a respected architect who had built many other buildings in the American West.

== Classes, exhibits, and other programming ==
The Art Students League of Denver offers art classes to youth and adults at the Sherman School as well as with community partners across the Denver metro area. ASLD does not have a degree-based curriculum, and students can choose which classes to take at their own pace. ASLD also provides a community space for teens on Fridays at a low cost for them to learn art skills, use materials they may not have access to, learn from professional artists, and be in community with each other.

ASLD has ongoing enrollment and offers a variety of media; they also have annual memberships that give access to class discounts and opportunities to show work in the annual Summer Art Market.

ASLD also has other exhibition opportunities for members and the larger art community. This includes their biennial national juried exhibit: delecTABLE: Fine Art of Dining, which has featured functional ceramic artworks from across the country since its first iteration in 2012.

Other notable programming includes their Visiting Artist of Color Residency program, which started in 2021. This residency provides the selected artist with studio space, a living stipend, as well as funding for rent and materials. During the span of the residency, the selected artist hosts workshops and studio visits open to the public. The residency culminates with a solo exhibition that features the artwork they created throughout the residency.

ASLD Artists-in-residence included:

- Kevin Snipes, who collaborated with North High School students while continuing his ceramics art practice.
- Natalia Roberts, who used photography and videography throughout her residency.
- Guadalupe Hernandez, who created paintings and papel picado on themes of family, work, and migration during his residency.
- Desirae Brown, who used sculpture, fiber arts, ceramics, and photography to communicate her experience as a Black single mother.

== Community engagement ==
ASLD works with many local partners to provide free art workshops at correctional facilities, libraries, and more. In 2019, ASLD and the Gathering Place collaborated to create an exhibition for Gathering Place art students.

== Summer Art Market ==
Summer Art Market (SAM) is the ASLD's annual art market featuring over 150 artists from the ASLD community. The art featured showcases media that students can learn by taking ASLD classes. These include but are not limited to ceramics, mixed media, digital art, printmaking, fiber art, and jewelry. Throughout the weekend, SAM also features demonstrations from ASLD faculty, and kids' activities.

== Notable instructors and alumni ==
The list of Art Students League of Denver instructors and alumni includes:

- Margaretta Gilboy
- Doug Dawson
- Mitch Caster
- Dennis Pendleton
- Timothy Standring
- Ron Hicks
- Jolynn Duesberry
- Daniel Sprick
- Peter Durst
- Barry Rose
- Kathleen Caricof
- Madeline Wiener
- Tony Ortega
- Hamari Ikeda
- Jerry De La Cruz
- Buffalo Kaplinski
- Quang Ho
- Michael Gadlin
- Ramon Kelley
- John Lencicki
